= Goya (disambiguation) =

Francisco Goya (1746–1828) was a Spanish romantic painter and printmaker.

Goya may also refer to:

== Film and television ==
- Goya or the Hard Way to Enlightenment, a 1971 East German film
- Goya (TV series), a 2015 Pakistani television series
- Goya Awards, a film award in Spain
- Goya (film), a 2022 Mexican drama film

== Music ==
- Goya (band), a Polish pop group
- Goya: A Life in Song, a musical by Maury Yeston
- Goya (opera), an opera by Gian Carlo Menotti
- Goya guitar, a line of acoustic guitars created by Levin
- Goya, a line of electric guitars by Hagström

== Places ==
- Goya, Argentina, a city in Corrientes Province, Argentina
  - Goya Department, Corrientes Province, Argentina
- Goya (crater), a crater on Mercury

== Ships ==
- MV Goya, a Norwegian motor freighter used by Nazi Germany in World War II
- SS Goya, a Norwegian ship that carried eastern European refugees to New Zealand in 1951

== People ==
- Goya (surname)
- Goya (wrestler) (b. 1987), Mexican professional wrestler
- Goya Henry (1901–1974), Australian aviator
- Goya Jaekel (b. 1974), German footballer
- Goya Toledo (b. 1969), Spanish actress

== Other uses ==
- Goya Foods, a food manufacturer and distributor in the U.S. and Latin America
- Goya (moth), a genus of moth
- Greek Orthodox Youth of America, a Greek-American youth group
- 6592 Goya, a Main-belt asteroid
- Goya Museum, a museum in Castres, France
- Goya (Madrid Metro), a station named after the Spanish painter
- Goya (cosmetics), a UK perfume and cosmetics brand
- Bitter melon or goya, a tropical and subtropical vine with edible fruit
- Goya, a biography by Lion Feuchtwanger
- Goya, a biography by Robert Hughes
- Goya, a nightclub in the former Neues Schauspielhaus, Berlin, Germany

== See also ==
- Goia (disambiguation)
- Goiás (disambiguation)
