= Eduardo Lastenes Colombres Mármol =

Argentine marine and diplomat (1878–1943)

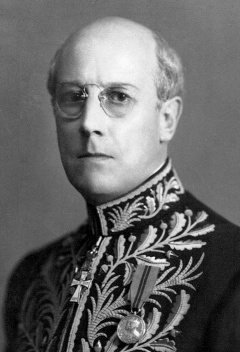

Ambassador of Argentina to Colombia and Venezuela
- In office 1931–1934

Ambassador of Argentina to Czechoslovakia and Poland
- In office 1935–1935
- Preceded by: Roberto Levillier

Ambassador of Argentina to Peru
- In office 1936–1939
- Preceded by: Antonio Mora y Araujo
- Succeeded by: Máximo Etchecopar

Personal details
- Born: February 10, 1878 Rosario, Argentina
- Died: 1943 Buenos Aires, Argentina
- Education: Escuela Naval Militar

Military service
- Branch/service: Argentine Navy
- Years of service: 1900–1906
- Rank: Alférez

Eduardo Lastenes Colombres Mármol (February 10, 1878 – 1943) was an Argentine diplomat and marine.

He achieved temporary popularity through comments in the press of South American nations on the occasion of his book on the Guayaquil Conference, inspired by a series of documents whose apocryphal nature was widely demonstrated.

== Early life ==
Colombres was born in Rosario to an Argentine patrician family, whose lineages date back to the Argentine colonial era, with one of his ancestors being a congressman in the declaration of Argentine independence. His parents were Lastenes Colombres and Petrona del Mármol.

He graduated as a midshipman from the Naval Military School in 1900, retiring from the navy in 1906, with the rank of Alférez (currently equivalent to corvette lieutenant). In 1900, he was Midshipman on the first circumnavigation voyage of the Frigate ARA Presidente Sarmiento.

== Diplomatic career ==
He entered the consular career in 1905, when he was appointed Consul in Paysandú. In 1909 he was Consul 1st class in Cardiff. From 1911 to 1913 he served as Consul General in Calcutta, and as such he represented Argentina at the coronation of George V of the United Kingdom as Emperor of India. He left office when he was sent in 1920 as consul in Bremen, and that same year he was appointed Consul General in Copenhagen, a position he held until 1923.

Between 1923 and 1931 he was Consul General 1st class in Montevideo. He achieved his promotion and between 1931 and 1934 he was Extraordinary Envoy and Plenipotentiary Minister in Colombia and Venezuela. Later, from 1935 to 1936 he held the position of Envoy Extraordinary and Minister Plenipotentiary in Poland and Czechoslovakia, with residence in Prague.

He reached the top of the diplomatic ladder, when from 1936 to 1939 he served as Ambassador to Peru.
