= Ramón Antonio Mora y Araujo =

Argentine politician and diplomat (1869–1936)

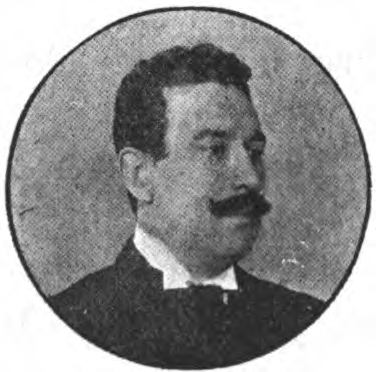

Ambassador of Argentina to Peru
- In office 1936 – May 18, 1936
- Succeeded by: Eduardo Lastenes Colombres Mármol

Ambassador of Argentina to Brazil
- In office January 1922 – July 1933
- Preceded by: Mario Ruiz de los Llanos
- Succeeded by: Ramón J. Cárcano

Personal details
- Born: 1869 Goya, Argentina
- Died: May 18, 1936 Buenos Aires, Argentina
- Education: University of Buenos Aires

Ramón Antonio Mora y Araujo (Goya, 1869 — Buenos Aires, May 18, 1936) was an Argentine politician and diplomat, who served as his country's ambassador to Brazil (1922–1933) and Peru (1933–1936).

== Biography ==
Mora was born in Goya, Argentina in 1869, the son of Antonio Mora and Sinforosa Araujo, and in 1896 he graduated from the University of Buenos Aires. In his hometown he served as mayor in 1901 and as rector of the National College. He was also the owner and director of the newspaper La Hora, close to the Liberal Party of Corrientes.

In September 1921 he was appointed envoy extraordinary and minister plenipotentiary of Argentina in Brazil by President Hipólito Yrigoyen. He began serving in January 1922, until the diplomatic mission was elevated to the rank of embassy in August of the same year. He remained in Rio de Janeiro until July 1933, when he was succeeded by Ramón J. Cárcano.

He was then appointed ambassador to Peru by President Agustín Pedro Justo, a position he held at the time of his death in May 1936 in Buenos Aires.

A place in Goya Department bears his name.
