= Goya albivenella =

Scientific classification
- Domain: Eukaryota
- Kingdom: Animalia
- Phylum: Arthropoda
- Class: Insecta
- Order: Lepidoptera
- Family: Pyralidae
- Genus: Goya
- Species: G. albivenella

Binomial name
- Goya albivenella Ragonot, 1888

Synonyms
- Saluria cancelliella Ragonot, 1888

Species of moth

Goya albivenella is a species of snout moth in the genus Goya. It was described by Émile Louis Ragonot in 1888. It is found in Argentina where it was "described from Goya, Corrientes, Argentia".
