= Daniel García-Mansilla =

Argentine diplomat (1867–1957)

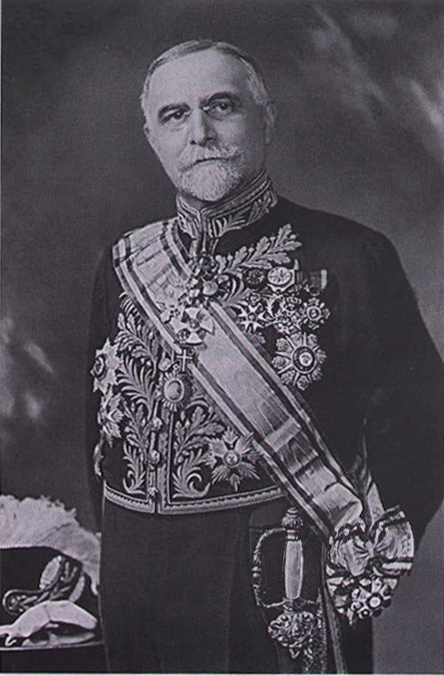

Ambassador of Argentina to Spain
- In office 1927–1937
- Preceded by: Roberto Levillier
- Succeeded by: Ramón Luis de Oliveira Cézar

Ambassador of Argentina to the Holy See
- In office 1914–1926
- Preceded by: Ángel de Estrada
- Succeeded by: Alberto Blancas

Chargé d'affaires of Argentina to Chile
- In office 1896–1897
- Preceded by: Baldomero García Sagastume
- Succeeded by: Norberto Piñero

Personal details
- Born: October 12, 1867 Paris, France
- Died: June 23, 1957 (aged 89) Buenos Aires, Argentina
- Spouse: Adela Rodríguez Larreta
- Parent(s): Manuel García; Eduarda Mansilla
- Awards: Order of Isabella the Catholic (Grand cross); Cross of Naval Merit (1935)

Daniel García-Mansilla (Paris, October 12, 1867 — Buenos Aires, June 23, 1957) was an Argentine diplomat, doctor of laws, poet, writer, and priest. He was decorated with the Legion of Honour, the grand cross of the Order of Isabella the Catholic, the grand cross of the Order of the Spanish Republic; the great cross of the Order of Naval Merit, among others.

== Early life ==
García-Mansilla was born at 11 Rue de Chateaubriand in Paris, part of a diplomatic family and a member of its third generation, being registered at the Argentine Legation in the city. During this period, his father was then serving as secretary of the legation. He was the son of Manuel Rafael García Aguirre, who replaced Domingo Faustino Sarmiento as Minister Plenipotentiary to the United States, and Eduarda Mansilla, a pioneer of Argentine women's literature. He was the maternal grandson of Agustina Ortiz de Rozas and the independence warrior, General Lucio Norberto Mansilla. He was the paternal grandson of Manuel José García, several times minister in the governments of Juan José Viamonte, Juan Gregorio de Las Heras, Bernardino Rivadavia, Juan Lavalle, Juan Manuel de Rosas, among others, and of Manuela Aguirre and Alonso de Lajarrota, founder of the Charity of Buenos Aires.

He began his studies as a boarder at the College of Saint Francis Xavier in Vannes, Brittany, France, a Jesuit educational establishment, which had marked literary tendencies; he later received a Bachelor of Arts and Sciences, a diploma from the Paris School of Moral and Political Sciences, to complete them at the historic University of Paris – La Sorbonne.

== Diplomatic career ==
He entered the foreign service at the age of nineteen on October 18, 1886, as an attaché in the Italian legation. Later posts included: second secretary in the German legation; first secretary in the Brazilian Legation; first secretary in the legations of Italy and Switzerland: first secretary in the legation of France and the Holy See; Extraordinary Envoy and Minister Plenipotentiary for the coronation of His Holiness Pius X; Ambassador and Plenipotentiary Minister in Paraguay; Ambassador to Peru and Ecuador; Ambassador to the Holy See; Extraordinary and Plenipotentiary Ambassador to the government of Spain, ending his career after 52 years of an uninterrupted career in the foreign service of his country.

=== Spanish Civil War ===
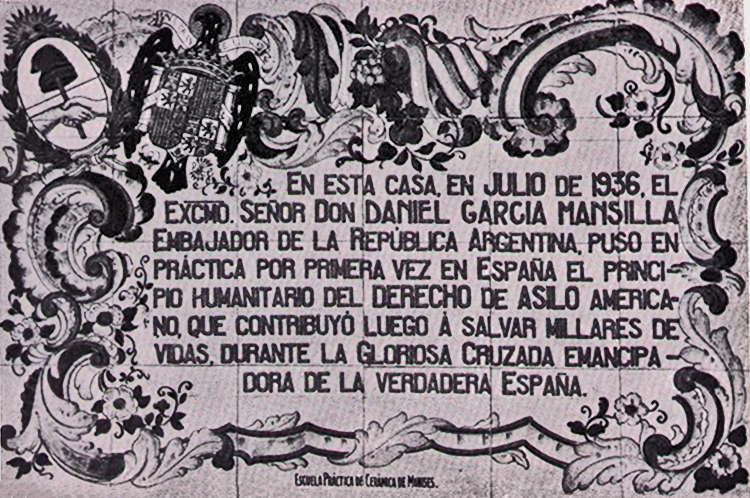
Commemorative plaque in honour of García-Mansilla, 1940.

During the Spanish Civil War, in what has been described as an "unusual and extraordinary" story, García-Mansilla notably applied for the first time in Europe the principle of political asylum, granted to a group of refugees of the Nationalist faction in his residence.

On July 27, 1936, the foreign ministry of Argentina received, from its embassy in London, a telegram from Garcia-Mansilla that stated that the ambassador, incommunicado, had granted asylum to Spanish refugees in his residence in Zarauz, known as the Casa Azul de Ayala.

On August 1, 1936, a delegation from the Popular Front appeared at the ambassador's residence, ordering him to hand over the asylum seekers, which he refused. On day three the situation was repeated again, but with the militias threatening to storm the residence. The civil governor of Guipúzcoa established a guard that momentarily stopped the attack. García-Mansilla's situation was severe, as he was in fact a prisoner, his bank account had been seized and both his family and his refugees were "practically living off the credit and savings of the servants", refusing to be evacuated along with the other diplomatic representatives as he insisted in taking the Spanish refugees with him.

Foreign Minister Carlos Saavedra Lamas supported García Mansilla's attitude: "...he encouraged and congratulated him for his patriotism to continue maintaining our representation with height and energy, especially with regard to the asylum provided to its refugees, which this government considers inviolable and is willing not to allow him to be mocked."

García-Mansilla was described as "a small, thin, pale man, with a pointed beard, similar to that of the Gentleman with his hand on his chest, portrayed by El Greco. In the red Madrid he did a superb job like the Scarlet Pimpernel, only comparable to that done by his colleague Aurelio Núnez Morgado, ambassador of Chile. Thousands of persecuted Spaniards owe their lives to these two South American diplomats. He was the one who obtained the mediation of the International Red Cross, in collaboration with the British Royal Navy, to free and save from certain death the women imprisoned in the floating prisons of Bilbao, [...]."

== Later life ==
He ventured mainly into poetry and theater, leaving memoirs about his diplomatic life. He was the author of numerous literary articles, art, criticism and philosophy, as well as numerous speeches during his long diplomatic life in fourteen countries.

He married Adela Rodriquez Larreta, older sister of the writer Enrique Larreta, author of “La gloria de don Ramiro." They had no children. After being widowed in August 1944, García-Mansilla deepened his connection to Catholicism, asking for special papal authorization from Pope Pius XII to receive the sacrament at eighty-four years of age.
