= Goya ovaliger =

Scientific classification
- Domain: Eukaryota
- Kingdom: Animalia
- Phylum: Arthropoda
- Class: Insecta
- Order: Lepidoptera
- Family: Pyralidae
- Genus: Goya
- Species: G. ovaliger

Binomial name
- Goya ovaliger (A. Blanchard, 1975)

Synonyms
- Atopothoures ovaliger Blanchard, 1975

Species of moth

Goya ovaliger is a species of snout moth, family Pyralidae. It was described by André Blanchard in 1975 and is known from the US state of Texas. It is similar to Goya stictella.

The wingspan is 15–20 mm (0.59–0.79 in) in males and 18–20.5 mm (0.71–0.81 in) in females.
