= Embassy of Argentina, Lima =

Argentine diplomatic mission in Peru

Embassy of Argentina in Peru
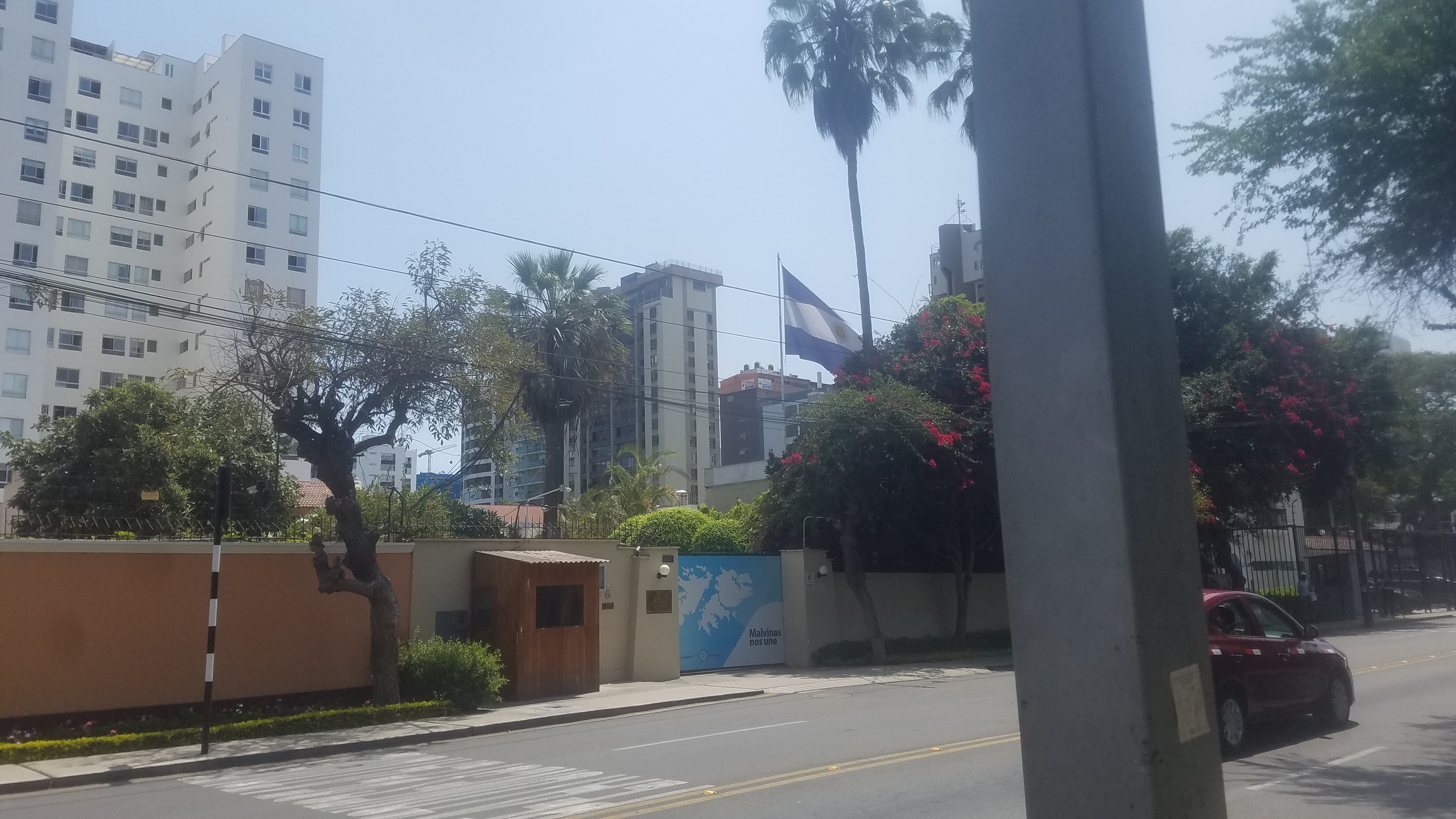
- Location: Lima, Peru
- Address: Arequipa 121 (Palace); Las Flores 326 (Embassy); Pablo Bermúdez 143 (Consulate)
- Opened: 1938; moved 2012
- Ambassador: Samuel Ortiz Basualdo
- Website: Official website

The embassy of Argentina in Peru represents the permanent diplomatic mission of Argentina in Peru. It is located at the Casa Gabaldoni, a former private residence by Luis Miró Quesada Garland at 326 Las Flores Avenue, in San Isidro District, Lima, having previously operated at its traditional location from 1938 to 2012.

The embassy operates a Consulate-General in Santa Beatriz, a neighbourhood of Lima District.

The current Argentine ambassador is Samuel Ortiz Basualdo.

== History ==
=== Former chancery (1938–2012) ===
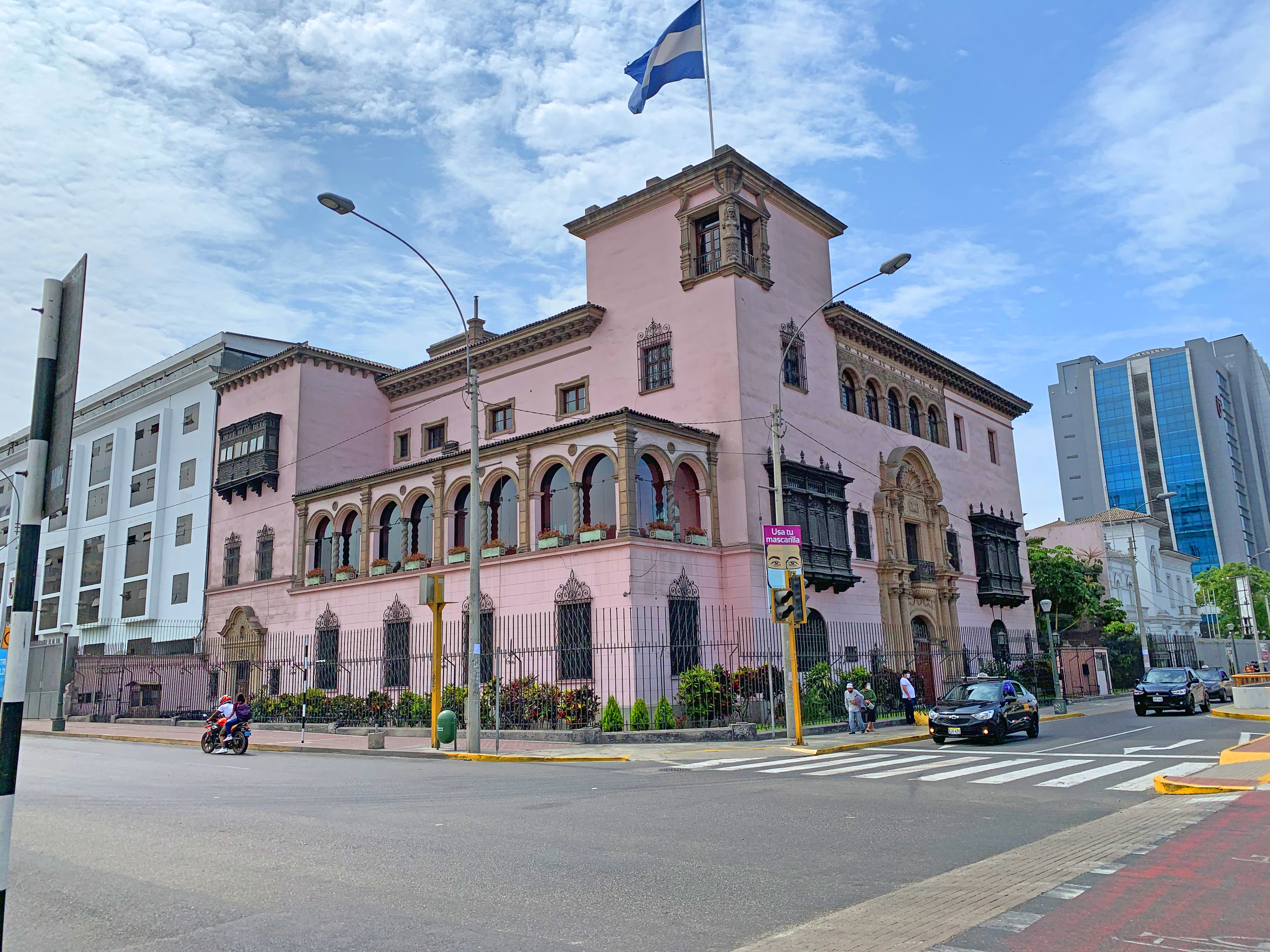
The chancery in 2023

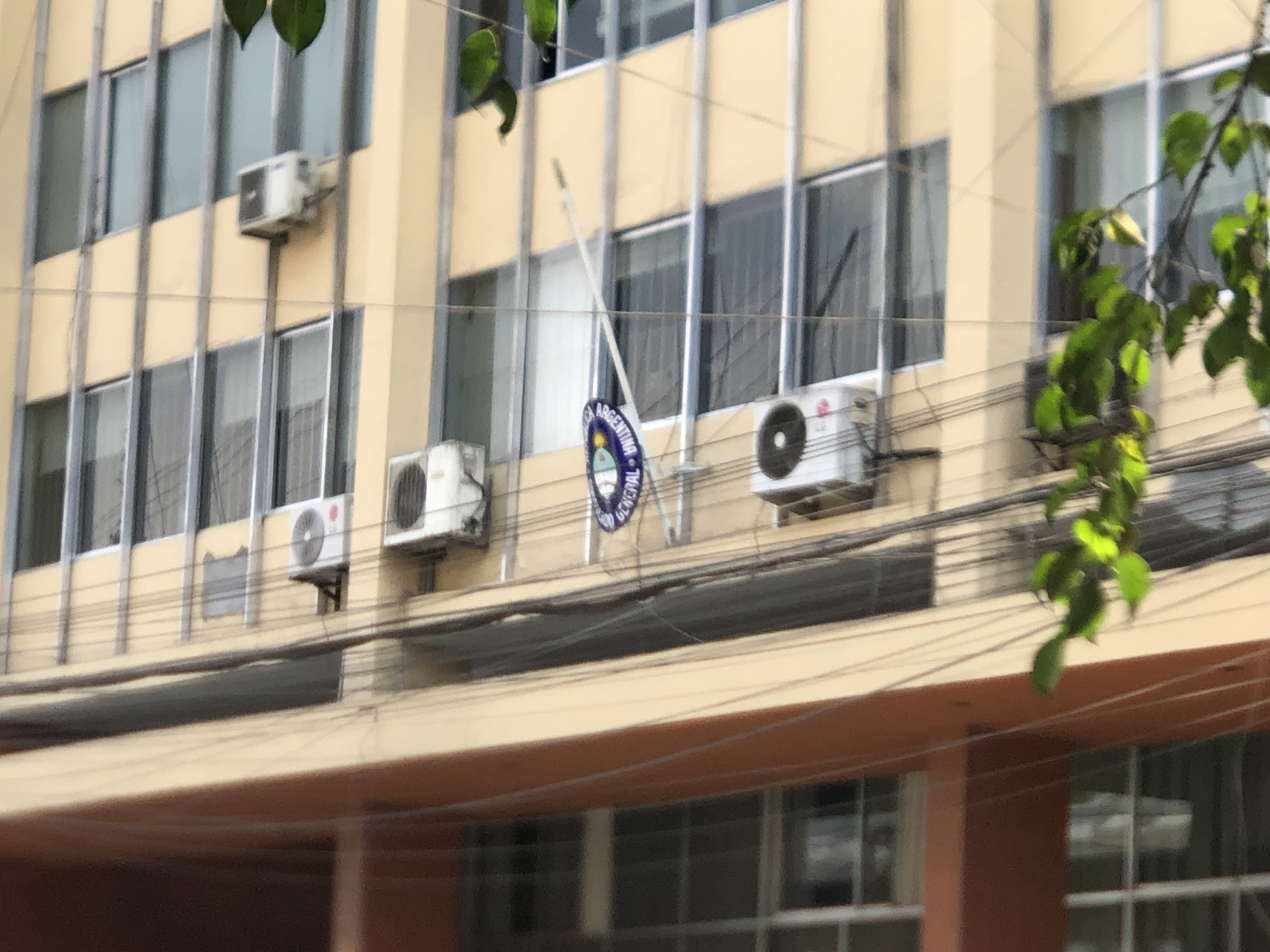
Consulate-General in Santa Beatriz.

Both countries established relations in 1822, with both countries having come into existence as a result of Argentine-born José de San Martín's campaigns in the River Plate and Lower Peru during the Spanish American wars of independence. The first Argentine representative to Peru was Estanislao Lynch. Relations have continued since, having been warm for the most part, with the exception of a scandal during the Cenepa War in 1995.

The embassy's traditional palace was built on land donated in 1921 by the government of Peru on the occasion of the Centennial of the Independence of Peru, located next to the Moorish Arch in the neighbourhood of Santa Beatriz. In response, the Argentine government donated the premises currently occupied by the Embassy of Peru in Buenos Aires, the work of the Argentine architect Alejandro Bustillo.

The Palace was designed in a neo-colonial style by the Argentine architect Martín Noel in 1929 and built by the Construction Engineer Gonzalo Panizo, being inaugurated in 1938 by the then Minister of Foreign Affairs of Peru, Carlos Concha, and the then Argentine Ambassador, Ricardo Colombres Mármol.

Due to its architectural and historical value, in October 2019 the building at Av. Arequipa 121 was declared an "Integrated Monument of the Cultural Heritage of the Nation" by the Ministry of Culture of Peru.

=== Current chancery ===
From its inauguration and until 2012, the traditional palace housed both the embassy and the ambassador's residence until the former moved to San Isidro.

The embassy's current building is the former Casa Gabaldoni, built by architect Luis Miró Quesada Garland as a private residence from 1944 to 1945.

== List of representatives ==
Name	Portrait	Term begin	Term end	Head of state	Notes
Ignacio Álvarez Thomas		1825	1827?	Juan Gregorio de las Heras	
Estanislao Lynch		1826	?	Bernardino Rivadavia	
Luis L. Domínguez		1874	1874?	Domingo Faustino Sarmiento	After finishing his term, he was appointed as the representative to Brazil.
Martín García Mérou				José Evaristo Uriburu	c. 1891
Daniel García-Mansilla		January 31, 1907	?	José Figueroa Alcorta	Also accredited to Ecuador.
Roberto Levillier		1922	1926	Hipólito Yrigoyen	
Ramón Antonio Mora y Araujo		1933	May 18, 1936	Agustín Pedro Justo	Died in office.
Eduardo Lastenes Colombres Mármol		1936	1939	Agustín Pedro Justo	
Máximo Etchecopar		1960	1962	Arturo Frondizi	
Diógenes Taboada		1962	1962	Arturo Frondizi	
Humberto Francisco Burzio		1962	1964	José María Guido	Burzio presented his credentials on September 17, 1962.
Ernesto Sammartino		1963	June 28, 1966	Arturo Umberto Illia	Designated in 1963 by Illia, he left in 1966 due to the coup d'état.
Carlos José Caballero		February 1970	January 1971	Juan Carlos Onganía	
Joaquín Díaz de Vivar		1974	1976	Juan Perón	
Jorge Chevalier		1976	1979	Isabel Perón	Counter admiral.
Luis Pedro Sánchez Moreno		July 5, 1979	December 9, 1983	Jorge Rafael Videla	
Anselmo Marini		1984	June 1989	Raúl Alfonsín	
Julián Licastro		1989	1993	Carlos Menem	
Abel Posse		1998	2000	Carlos Menem	
Víctor Hipólito Martínez		December 10, 1999	December 20, 2001	Carlos Menem	
Jorge Vázquez		2002	2004	Fernando de la Rúa	
Darío Alessandro		May 8, 2008	December 10, 2015	Cristina Fernández de Kirchner	
Ana María Ramírez		May 2, 2017	2018	Mauricio Macri	
Jorge Yoma		May 10, 2018	December 10, 2019	Mauricio Macri	
Carlos Álvarez		N/A	N/A	Alberto Fernández	Appointed in 2020, he did not take up his post due to the COVID-19 pandemic.
Enrique Vaca-Narvaja		September 8, 2020	2024	Alberto Fernández	
Samuel Ortiz Basualdo		February 2024	Incumbent	Javier Milei	

== See also ==
- Argentina–Peru relations
- List of ambassadors of Peru to Argentina
