= Luis Pedro Sánchez Moreno =

Argentine politician (1927–1989)

Ambassador of Argentina to Peru
- In office July 5, 1979 – December 9, 1983
- Preceded by: Jorge Chevalier
- Succeeded by: Anselmo Marini

Personal details
- Born: 1927
- Died: November 8, 1989
- Education: Naval Military School
- Awards: Cross of Naval Merit (1978)

Military service
- Branch/service: Argentine Navy
- Years of service: 1948–1979
- Rank: Counter admiral

Luis Pedro Horacio Sánchez Moreno (1927 — November 8, 1989) was an Argentine soldier, belonging to the Argentine Navy, who reached the rank of counter admiral. He served as Naval Commander of the River Area, Director of Naval Instruction and ambassador to Peru during the military dictatorship known as the National Reorganization Process.

== Biography ==
He entered the Naval Military School in 1944, graduating in 1948 with the rank of midshipman. His classmates were Jorge Isaac Anaya and Carlos Castro Madero.

In 1963, he was commander of the ARA Chiriguano. He was naval attaché in Chile in the early 1970s. Between 1970 and 1971 he was commander of the destroyer ARA Rosales (D-22).

In January 1976, he was appointed Naval Commander of the River Area based in Zárate, Buenos Aires. After the coup d'état of March 24, 1976, a clandestine detention center was set up in the facilities of the Zárate Prefecture. It has been indicated that it operated under the responsibility of Sánchez Moreno.

Between January 1977 and January 1979, he was in charge of the Directorate of Naval Instruction. This directorate was directly responsible for the Navy Mechanics School (ESMA) and the Marine Infantry Non-Commissioned Officers School (ESIM), where clandestine detention centers also operated.

In 1978, he was condecorated with the Cross of Naval Merit with white decoration.

Already in retirement, Jorge Rafael Videla appointed him ambassador to Peru by decree S No. 1605 of July 5, 1979. He remained in office until the end of the dictatorship, on December 9, 1983. During his tenure, in 1980 he carried out negotiations and communications with the Peruvian government headed by Pedro Richter Prada and the Argentine Foreign Ministry after learning about the activities of the Montoneros counteroffensive in Peru. The Peruvian press at that time denounced coordination between Leopoldo Galtieri and the government of Peru for the kidnapping of Federico Frías, Noemí Gianetti de Molfino, Julio César Ramírez and María Inés Raverta (Montoneros militants who had arrived in Peruvian territory), with participation from ambassador Sánchez Moreno.

During the Falklands War, in May 1982, the exiled former Peronist governors Oscar Bidegain and Ricardo Obregón Cano appeared before the Argentine embassy in Lima, offering to fight. Sánchez Moreno did not allow them entry to the diplomatic mission and ignored their requests.

At the end of the dictatorship, he presented his resignation from the position of ambassador, which was accepted on December 9, 1983, by resolution No. 1614 of the Minister of Foreign Affairs Juan Ramón Aguirre Lanari.

Years later, he benefited from the Full stop law of 1986. He died on November 8, 1989.

== See also ==
- Dirty War
