= Humberto Francisco Burzio =

Argentine historian (1902–1980)

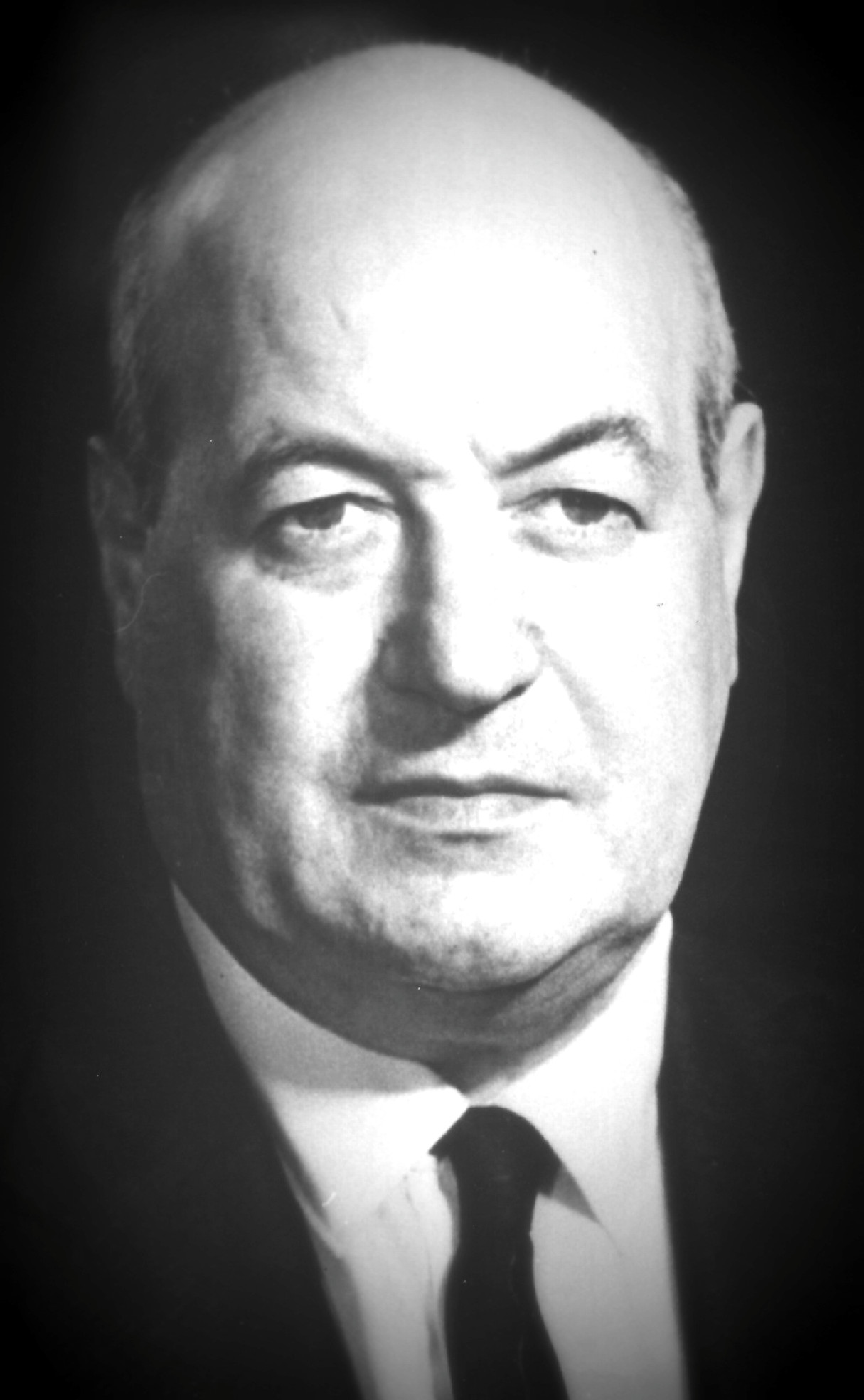

Ambassador of Argentina to Peru
- In office 1962–1964
- Preceded by: Diógenes Taboada
- Succeeded by: Ernesto Sammartino

Personal details
- Born: July 2, 1902; Buenos Aires, Argentina
- Died: August 18, 1980; Buenos Aires, Argentina

Humberto Francisco Burzio (Buenos Aires, July 2, 1902 — August 18, 1980) was an Argentine naval historian, numismatist, military officer and one time ambassador to Peru.

== Military career ==
He entered the Argentine Navy as an assistant accountant in 1923, had a distinguished naval career in the Quartermaster ranks and, after reaching the rank of captain, he requested his retirement from the force in 1952. In 1956, he was appointed to the Active Retirement Corps and, finally, in 1964, he began to provide military services in retirement until his death.

In this new stage of his life he was general secretary of the National Commission of Tribute to Admiral Guillermo Brown on the centenary of his death, whose activities took place between 1956 and 1957. On that occasion, together with the National Academy of History, the Papers of Admiral Brown were edited.

The effective performance of this commission generated interest in maintaining the study of the Argentine maritime and naval past. Thus, the Naval History Division was created on October 25, 1957, organised and commanded by Burzio, and dependent on the Undersecretariat of the Navy (organ of the Secretary of State for the Navy). Two years later, Burzio promoted the restructuring of that division into what was called the Department of Naval Historical Studies (DEHN); heading his leadership until March 1, 1970. Under his direction, the DEHN published approximately 35 works in the specialty naval history.

== Academic career ==
On the occasion of the Sesquicentennial of the May Revolution, his work Armada Nacional – Reseña histórica de su origen y desarrollo orgánico (1960) was published, which includes the organic aspect of the Argentine Navy, that is, that which refers to its origin and development, from its creation in 1811 and until the end of the 19th century. La historia del torpedo y sus buques en la Armada Argentina 1874-1900, published in 1968, "brings together valuable documentary material on [the torpedo], studying the ships and departments that were linked to it." Finally, his Historia de la Escuela Naval Militar (1972), published on the occasion of the centenary of said training institute, is where he studies its background and its evolution year after year until 1972, as well as the training trips on school-ships.

In his production, the author articulated the past of these naval institutions with that of his country because "there are no isolated stories within a town itself, nor are there any within the organizations that make up its body; They all have an interdependence that makes them unique." In his work, the permanent efforts of the men of the Navy to organise it with almost no means or personnel and respond to national interests stand out, both in times of armed conflict and in times of peace.

== Numimastic career ==
Likewise, Humberto Burzio stood out as a numismatist and achieved recognition from authorised critics, even internationally. He had a collection of more than 15,000 pieces including medals and coins. Some of his most relevant works in this field are: Ceca de la Villa Imperial de Potosí y su moneda colonial (1945), La historia numismática de la Armada Argentina (1945), La moneda primitiva del Perú en el siglo XVI (1947); Ensayo de un catálogo universal de medallas de los Reyes Católicos y descubrimiento de América (published in Barcelona in 1953), Diccionario de la moneda hispanoamericana (1956-1958) in three volumes and La Marina en la moneda romana (1961).

His last work, Buenos Aires en la medalla (1981) was published by the Municipality of Buenos Aires after his death. In his introduction, he not only explains how this work was achieved but also synthesises the scientific work of all the previous ones: "for years he worried about collecting, by acquisition, exchange or donation, medals referring to the city of Buenos Aires, with the ambitious goal to form its metallic documentary archive, which, once achieved, constitutes a chronicle of the episodes, transcendent or not, that marked its prodigious evolution, especially from the second half of the last century to the present."

He was a member of the American Numismatic Society of New York from which he received the Best Numismatist Award (1961) and of the Philippine Numismatic and Antiquerian of Manila. In addition, he was part of the Ibero-American Society of Numismatic Societies of Spain as a founding and merit member. In recognition of his activity, on two occasions he received from the Spanish government the decoration of the Cross of the Order of Naval Merit with white insignia, second and third class. Additionally, in 1965, he was awarded the Order of the Sun of Peru. Finally, he was honoured with the annual international Archer Milton Huntington (U.S.) and Javier Conde Garriga (Spain) awards.

== Other activities ==
Since 1946, he joined the National Academy of History of the Argentine Republic (known at the time as the Board of History and Numismatics), where he served as treasurer for more than twenty-five years. He accepted the appointment of full academician in 1947, which meant, by reciprocity, the same honour in the National Academy of History of Spain, in the National Academy of History of Peru and in the Geographic Institute of Uruguay; and the corresponding nominations to said institutions in Chile, Paraguay and Brazil. Finally in 1976, he was elected second vice president, a position he held until 1978. He held cultural positions such as the direction of the National Historical Museum (Buenos Aires, Argentina), the presidency of the Buenos Aires Institute of Numismatics and Antiquities, memberships within the National Commission of Museums, Monuments and Historical Places and in the National Academy of San Martín.

He represented Argentina in Peru with the rank of ambassador.

== Selected works ==
- Buenos Aires en la medalla, 1981 (posthumous)
- Historia de la Escuela Naval Militar, 1972.
- La historia del torpedo y sus buques en la Armada Argentina 1874-1900, 1968.
- La marina en la moneda romana: en su centenario, 1961.
- Armada Nacional – Reseña histórica de su origen y desarrollo orgánico, 1960
- San Martín y el mar, 1959
- La ceca de Lima: 1565-1824, 1958
- Diccionario de la moneda hispanoamericana, 1956-1958
- La medalla y el escudo a los libertadores de Montevideo: 1814, 1957
- Almirante Guillermo Brown: síntesis biográfica, 1957
- La ceca de la Villa Imperial de Potosí y la moneda colonial, 1945
- Historia numismática de la Armada Argentina, 1945
- Medallas del litigio de límites: argentino chileno, 1940.
- Nociones marítimas argentinas, 1940 (co-author)
