= Goya simulata =

Scientific classification
- Kingdom: Animalia
- Phylum: Arthropoda
- Class: Insecta
- Order: Lepidoptera
- Family: Pyralidae
- Genus: Goya
- Species: G. simulata

Binomial name
- Goya simulata J. C. Shaffer, 1989

Species of moth

Goya simulata is a species of snout moth in the genus Goya. It was described by Jay C. Shaffer in 1989 and is known from Brazil.
