= Goia =

Goia may refer to:

- A village in Ungheni Commune, Argeș County, Romania

== Romanian surname ==
- Ancuța Goia (b. 1976), Romanian rhythmic gymnast
- Cosmin Goia (b. 1982), Romanian football defender and manager
- Elise Popovici Goia (1921-2011), Romanian composer

== See also ==
- Goya (disambiguation)
- Goiás (disambiguation)
