= Argentina–Peru relations =

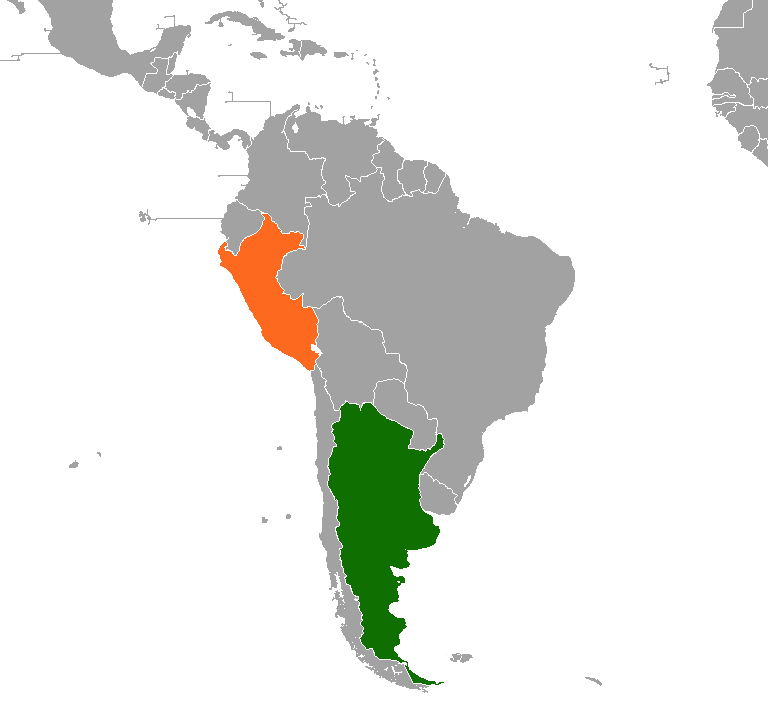
- Argentina: Peru

Diplomatic mission
- Embassy of Argentina, Lima: Embassy of Peru, Buenos Aires

Argentina–Peru relations (Spanish: Relaciones Argentina y Perú) are the historical and bilateral relations between the Argentine Republic and the Republic of Peru that have existed for over a century. Both countries established diplomatic relations on July 10, 1822. Both nations are members of the Community of Latin American and Caribbean States, Organization of American States, Organization of Ibero-American States and the United Nations.

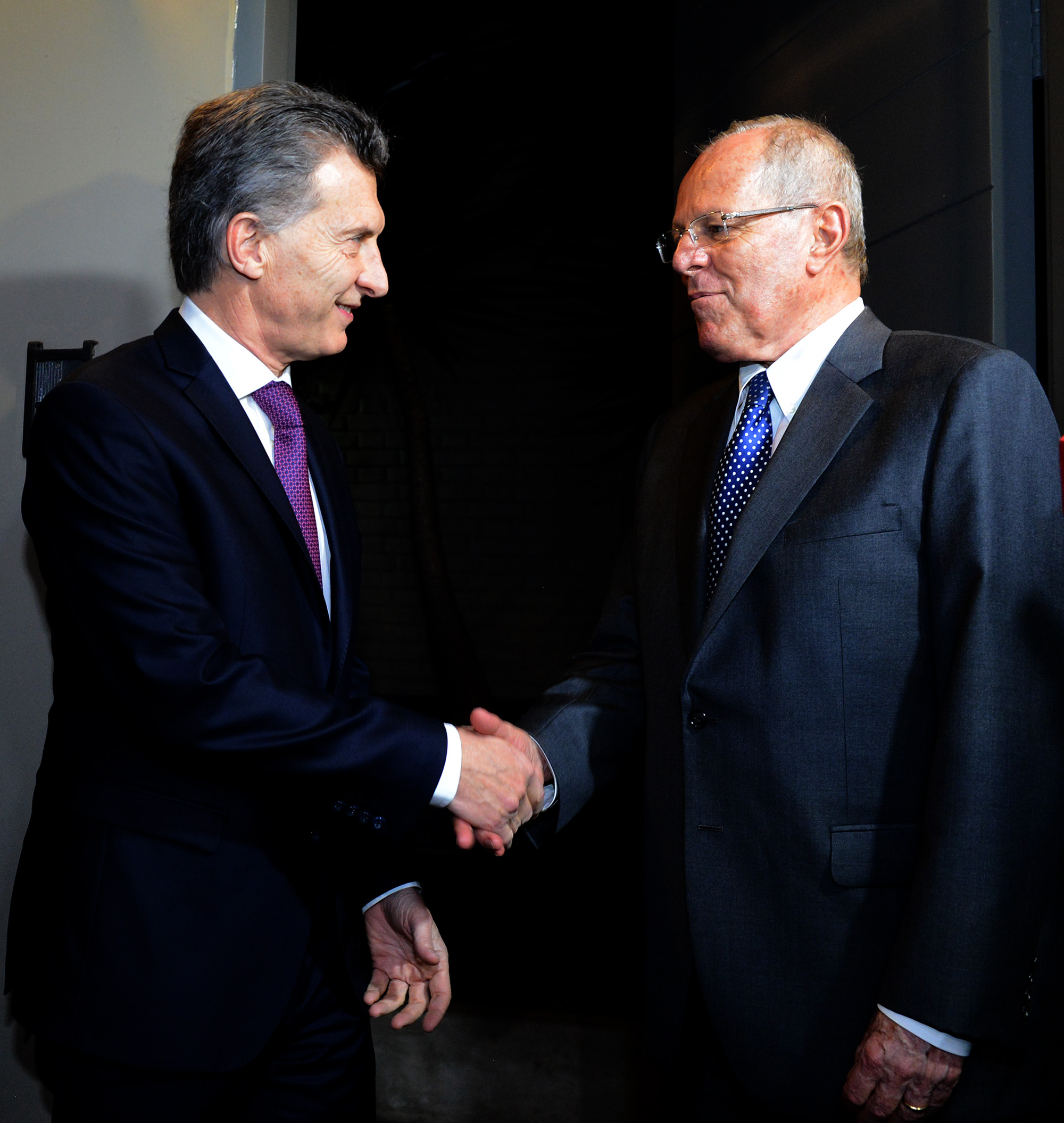
Presidents Mauricio Macri from Argentina (left) and Pedro Pablo Kuczynski from Peru (right)

== Historical relations ==
=== Independence War and 19th century ===
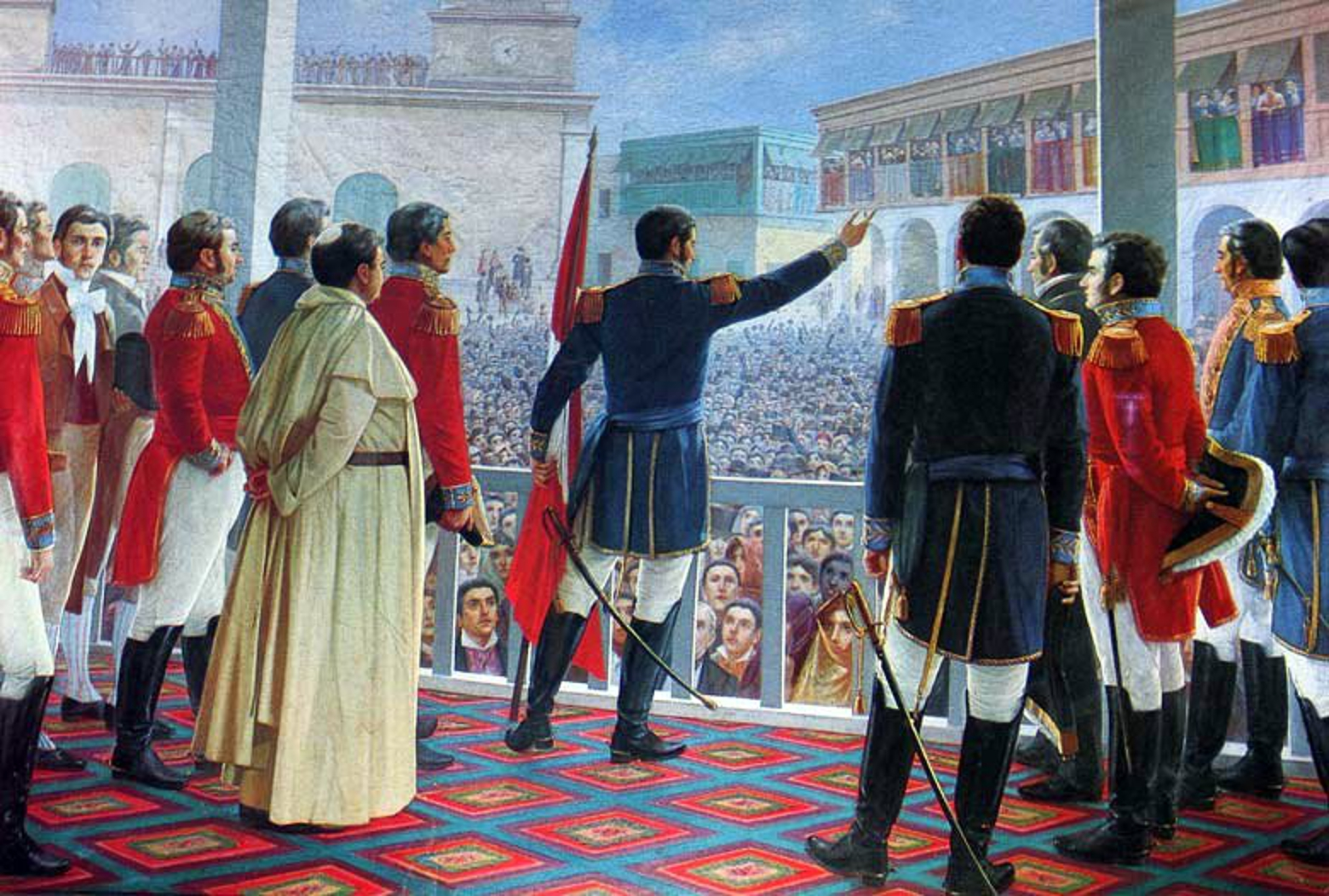
Juan Lepiani's representation of the proclamation of Peru's independence.

Argentine general José de San Martín arrived in Peru as part of the Peruvian War of Independence following a series of military victories and having informed the Peruvian people of his arrival, he entered Lima, where thousands of royalists still kept economic and political influence. Finally, on July 28, San Martín proclaimed Peru's independence from the Spanish Empire and an independent government was formed and he was appointed as Protector of Peru during the Protectorate of Peru with full civil and military authority, where San Martín continued the Royalist struggle and decreed the abolishment of the slavery system under the freedom of wombs principle and ruled until 1822., where he resigned from the position following the Guayaquil Conference with fellow liberator Simón Bolívar.

During the fascist-leaning military dictatorship of Manuel A. Odría in Peru, Argentina intervened regarding the detention of Haya de la Torre; Argentine leader Juan Perón and Chilean President Carlos Ibáñez del Campo demanded the release of over 150 Peruvian political prisoners, threatening to suspend the economic aid both countries provided to Peru. The Argentine president maintained a close correspondence with de la Torre, to the extent that Perón wrote the prologue for the fifth Argentine edition of Haya de la Torre's book "Ideario y acción aprista" (Aprista Ideology and Action). Between 1950 and 1955, Argentina granted refuge to more than 100 Aprista intellectuals.

During the Falklands War, the Peruvian government, under the administration of Fernando Belaúnde Terry, provided military, air and diplomatic support to Argentina during the conflict, in addition to acting as the country's principal diplomatic mediator to reach a peace agreement and supported by both state action and widespread public solidarity campaigns that dispatched humanitarian and materiel aid to Argentina. Contemporary accounts noted strong public sentiment favoring Argentine sovereignty over the islands, reflecting the long-standing historic and diplomatic ties between the two nations.

=== Cenepa War controversy ===
In 1995, Peru was involved in the Cenepa War, a brief thirty-three-day war with Ecuador over the Cenepa River sector of the Cordillera del Condor territory in the western Amazon basin. Argentina, Chile, Brazil, and the United States, as the guarantors of the 1942 Rio Protocol that had put an end to the Ecuadorian–Peruvian War earlier that century, worked with the governments of Peru and Ecuador to find a return to the status quo and end their border disputes once and for all. On 2005, General Víctor Manuel Bayas, former Chief of Staff of the Ecuadorian Armed Forces during the Cenepa War, made a series of declarations in regards to the armed conflict between Peru and Ecuador. On March 21, 2005, General Bayas was asked by the Ecuadorian newspaper El Comercio if Chile had sold armaments to Ecuador during the Cenepa War, to which he replied: "Yes, it was a contract with the militaries during the conflict." Furthermore, General Bayas revealed that Argentina and Russia had also sold weaponry to Ecuador during the conflict.

Argentina admitted to the illegal sale of armament by revealing the existence of three secret decrees signed by President Carlos Menem between the years of 1991 and 1995. The controversy regarding the decrees came about when the weapons sold did not go to Panama, Bolivia, and Venezuela as had been accorded, but instead the weapons ended up in Croatia and Ecuador at times when both of these nations were involved in wars and prohibited from receiving international military aid. The sale Argentina gave to Ecuador included 6.500 tons of rifles, cannons, anti-tank rockets, and ammunition. Menem was taken to court for his alleged association with these illegal acts in 2001, but was acquitted by Argentina's Supreme Court; however, in October 2008 the case was re-opened. Menem claimed he had no association with the weapons trade, and further added it was a political persecution made by Argentine president Cristina Fernández and, her husband and also former Argentine president, Néstor Kirchner.

== Resident diplomatic missions ==
- Argentina has an embassy and a consulate-general in Lima.
- Peru has an embassy in Buenos Aires and consulates-generals in Córdoba, La Plata and Mendoza.
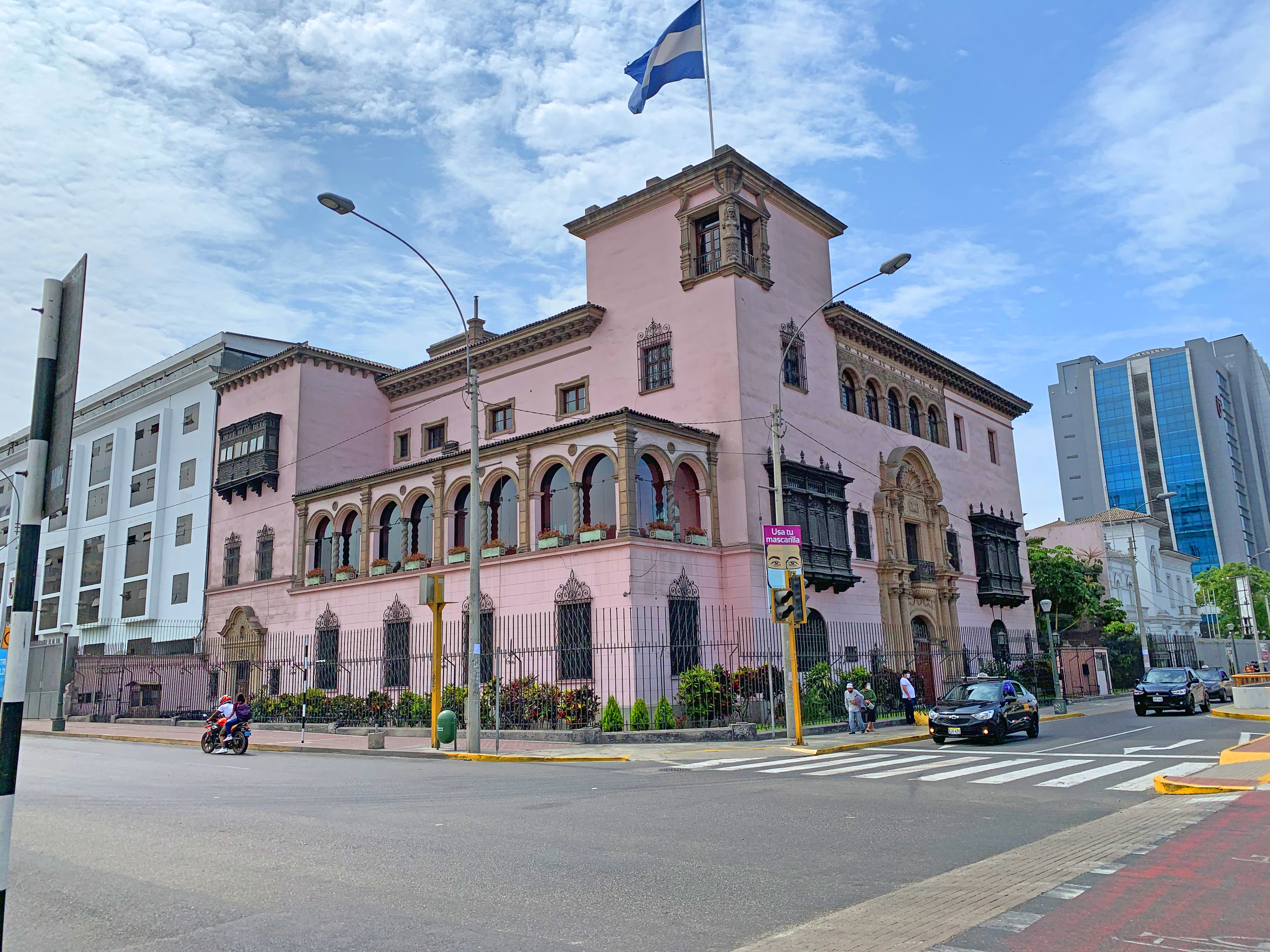
Embassy of Argentina in Lima

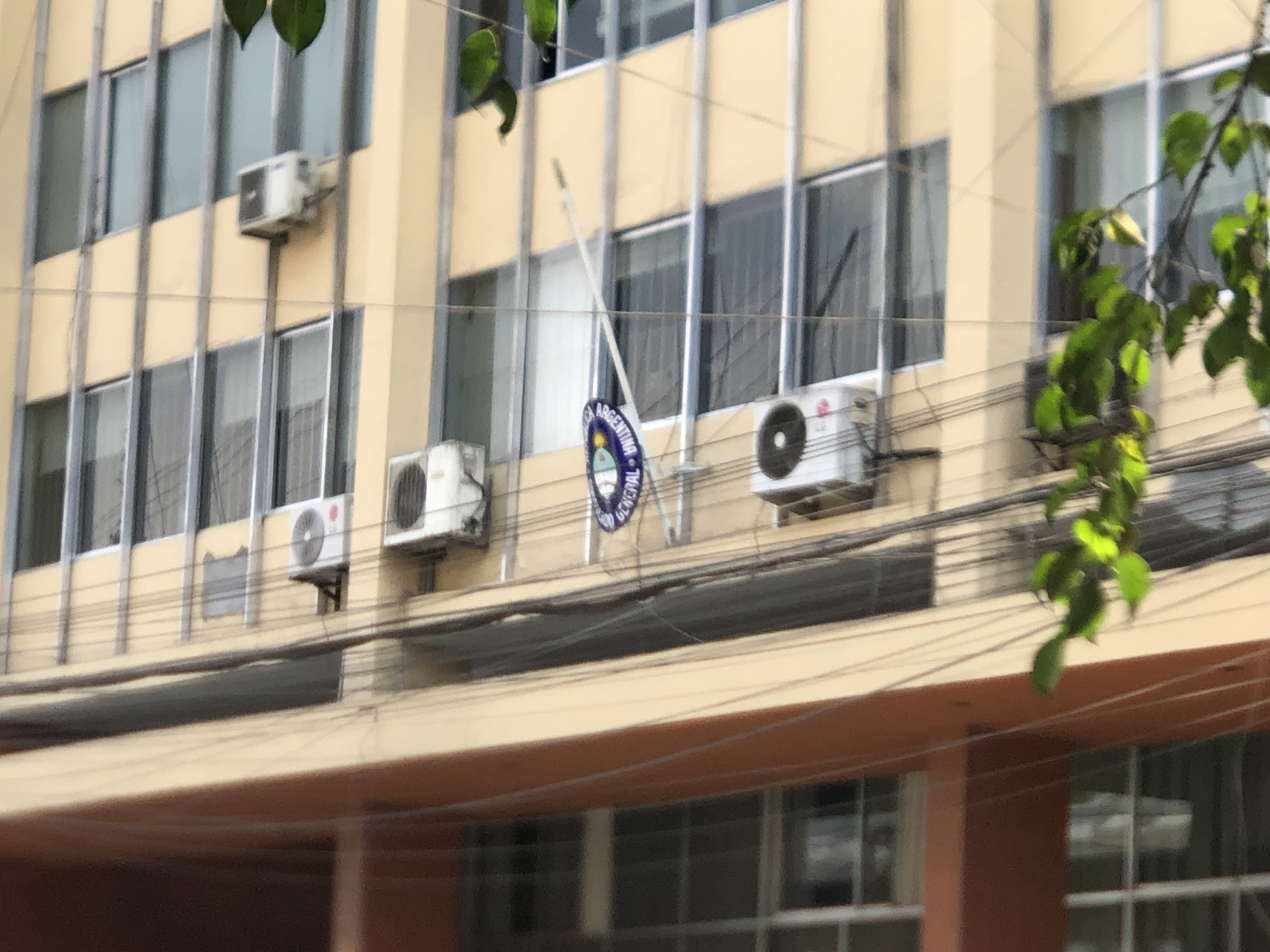
Consulate-General of Argentina in Lima

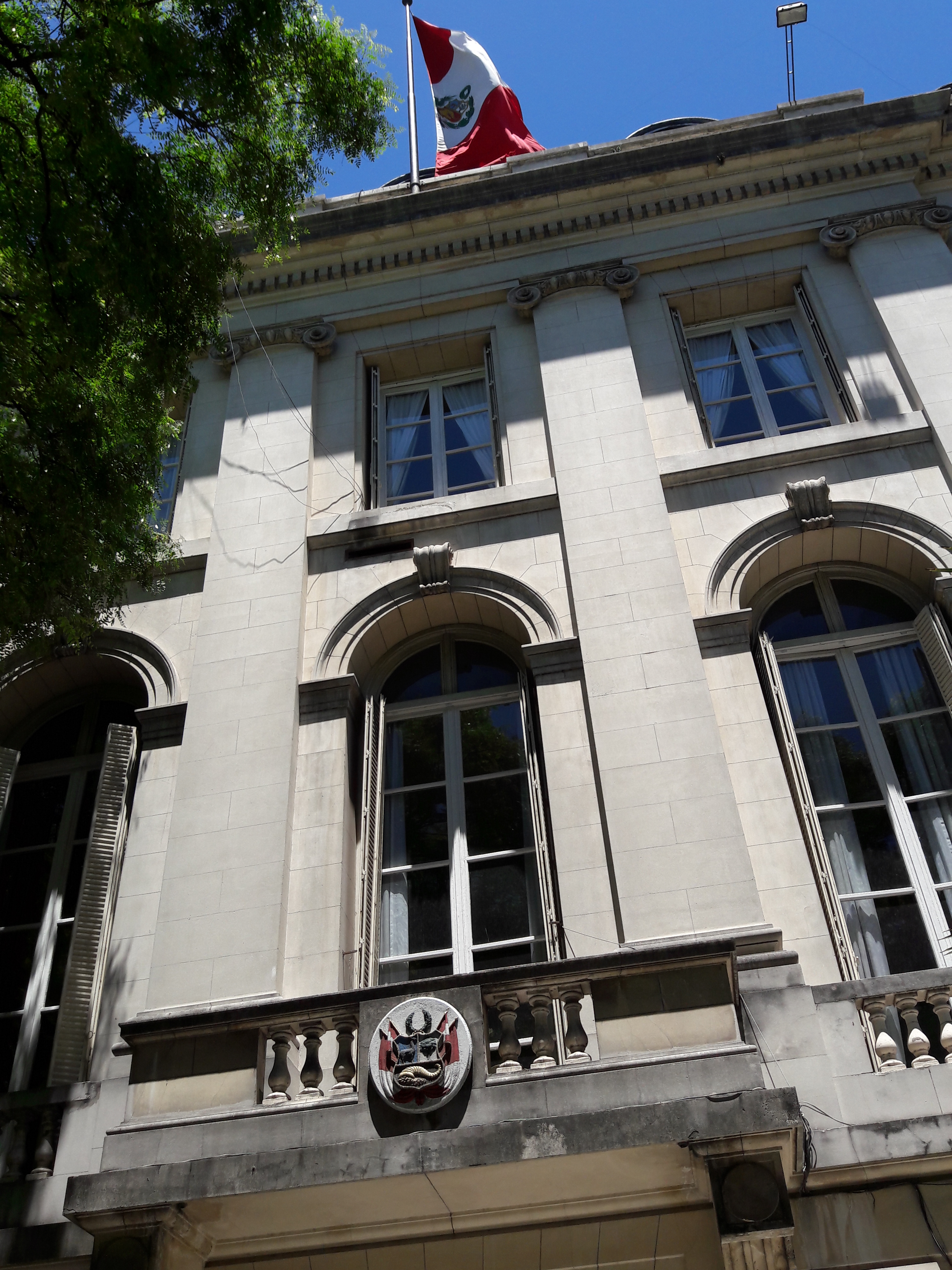
Embassy of Peru in Buenos Aires

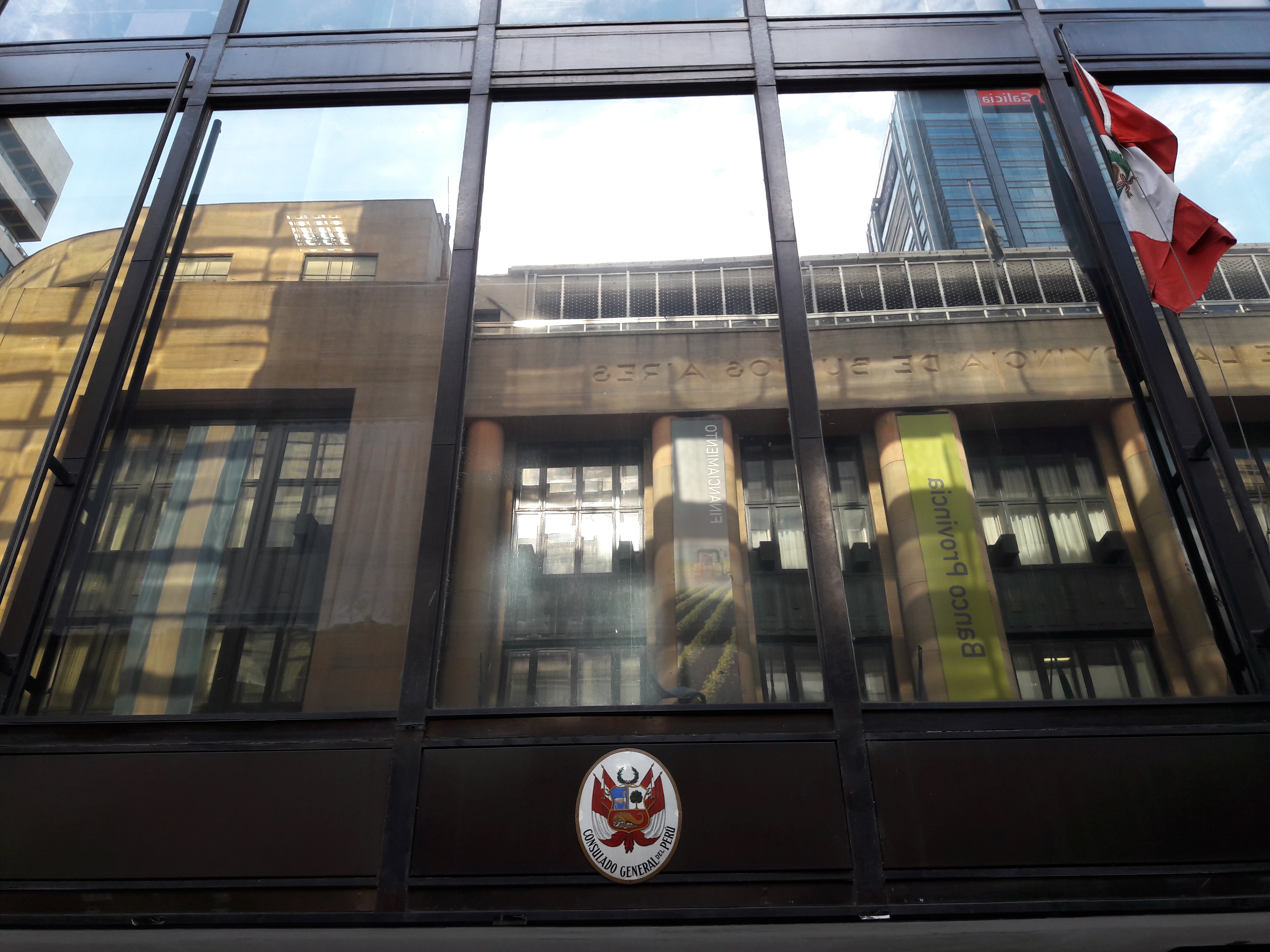
Consulate-General of Peru in Buenos Aires

== See also ==
- List of ambassadors of Argentina to Peru
- List of ambassadors of Peru to Argentina
- Peruvian Argentines
