= Julián Licastro =

Argentine politician (1940–2022)

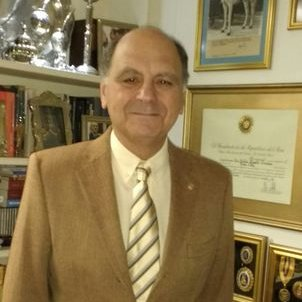

Ambassador of Argentina in Peru
- In office 1989–1993
- Preceded by: Anselmo Marini
- Succeeded by: Abel Posse

Personal details
- Born: March 26, 1940
- Died: January 27, 2022
- Party: Justicialist Party
- Spouse: Ana Pelizza
- Education: Colegio Militar de la Nación

Francisco Julián Licastro (March 26, 1940 — January 27, 2022) was an Argentine politician, leader of the Justicialist Party, diplomat, writer and artillery major of the Argentine Army.

== Biography ==
He graduated first in his class from the Military College, but was discharged for his opposition to the dictatorship of General Juan Carlos Onganía while he was in command of an artillery unit at the college.

In 1970 he met in Madrid with the exiled former president Juan Domingo Perón. Upon his return, he founded, together with José Luis Fernández Valoni, the Peronist Technological Command, a group aimed at organizing political actions of Peronism – still banned after fifteen years of his expulsion from the government – outside of unionism, at that time the only organised force with which Peronism counted. In 1972 he was part of the National Council of the National Justicialist Movement, and was part of the delegation that accompanied Perón on his definitive return to the country.

During Perón's third presidency he was named head of the Political Secretariat of the Presidency, through which he directed the Political Training School and the Union Training School. President María Estela Martínez de Perón appointed him minister plenipotentiary, based primarily in San Francisco and Lima.

During the last military dictatorship he had to go into exile; From Lima he moved to Caracas, where he established himself as a trainer of community leaders and experts from the United Nations Development Programme, touring several Latin American countries. In this period he began the publication of a large number of books on Justicialist doctrine and analysis.

He returned to his country in 1981, participating in the reorganization of the Justicialista Party, identified with "verticalism", which recognised the authority of María Estela Martínez de Perón. After the recovery of democracy in 1983, he was a consultant to the Senate of the Nation, advisor to the Presidency, and National Deputy for the City of Buenos Aires.

During the 1990s he identified with Menemism and was appointed ambassador of his country to Peru, and later head of the Argentine delegation to the Inter-American Defense Board. During the following decade he highlighted his initial support and subsequent opposition to Kirchnerism, regarding which he disseminated his differences through his book Peronismo o Populismo, Debate sobre la identidad política (2012).

In 2012 he published a memoir titled Diálogos con Perón. Regarding the government of Mauricio Macri, he wrote his last work Entre todos o nadie. Starting in 2016, he concentrated his activity on holding seminars and conferences.
