= Ernesto Sammartino =

Argentine politician (1902–1979)

Ernesto Enrique Sammartino
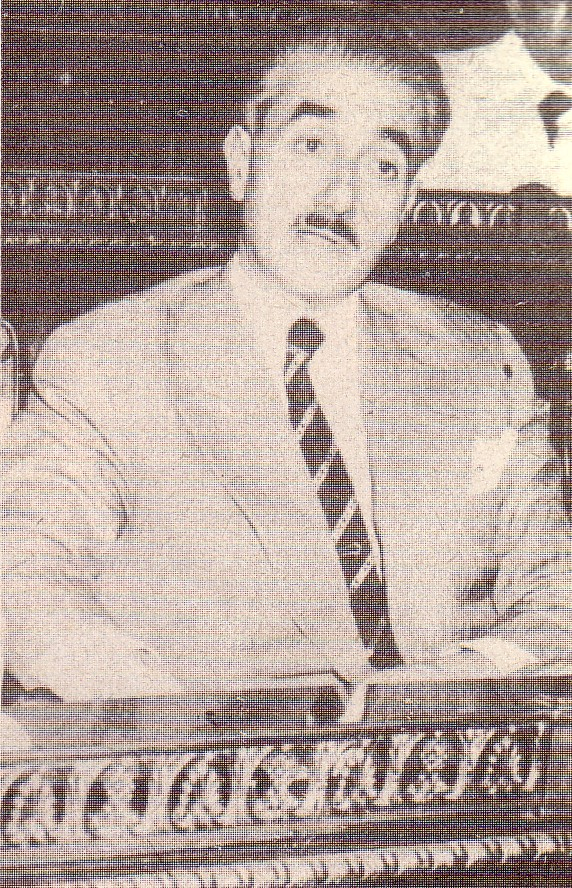

Deputy of the Argentine Nation for the Federal Capital
- In office May 1, 1960 – September 6, 1962
- In office April 25, 1946 – August 5, 1948

Deputy of the Argentine Nation for Entre Ríos
- In office April 25, 1936 – April 25, 1940

Ambassador of Argentina to Peru
- In office 1963–1966
- Preceded by: Humberto Burzio
- Succeeded by: Carlos José Caballero

Personal details
- Born: 1902; Ramallo, Argentina
- Died: January 7, 1979; Buenos Aires, Argentina
- Political party: UCR, UCRP

Ernesto Enrique Sammartino (Ramallo, 1902 — Buenos Aires, January 7, 1979) was an Argentine journalist, lawyer, writer, diplomat and politician belonging to the Radical Civic Union (UCR), who served several times as a national deputy and member of the National Academy of Moral and Political Sciences and who was famous for having used the term "zoological barrage" in 1947, when Juan Domingo Perón was elected as president of Argentina.

== Biography ==
After graduating in law and beginning his judicial career as a prosecutor in 1929 in the province of Entre Ríos and director of legal affairs of the Education Council of the same in 1931, he headed into the field of journalism and politics as a member of the Radical Civic Union.

In 1932, he was elected as a member of the Constituent Convention of Entre Ríos that modified the provincial constitution. For that same province he was elected national deputy for the period 1936–1940. In 1940 he was again elected national deputy for radicalism, this time for Buenos Aires.

He was part of the group led by General Arturo Rawson that participated in the military coup of June 4, 1943.

In the 1946 elections, when Juan Domingo Perón was elected president, he was again elected national deputy for the Federal Capital for the period 1946–1950, assuming a clearly anti-Peronist position. On August 8, 1946, he accused the Peronist majority of "knowing the 40 forms of theft," which is why he was suspended for three days.

In the course of a parliamentary debate he uttered the controversial and famous expression "zoological barrage." The event occurred during the session of the Chamber of Deputies on July 26, 1947, when he said:

The zoological barrage of February 24 seems to have thrown some congressman to his bench, so that from there he can meow at the stars for a diet of 2,500 pesos. Let him continue meowing, it doesn't bother me.

This led to a pistol duel between Sammartino and Eduardo Colom. Later, Sammartino explained that with his expression he was not referring to Peronist sympathizers, but to "the nuclei of activists, organized or inorganic, who did not represent the authentic people of the Nation, and who in the search for social justice did not hesitate to denigrate freedom."

As a result of these expressions, on August 5, 1948, he was expelled from the Chamber of Deputies by the vote of the Peronist legislators, leaving him without parliamentary immunity. In September 1948 he attended a public event with Ricardo Balbín and Arturo Frondizi in the Plaza de la Constitución when the police began to surround the place to arrest him. Sammartino, who at that time had already accumulated eight contempt proceedings, managed to leave the place and, later, go to Uruguay via Carmelo with false documents, remaining until 1955.

After Perón was overthrown in 1955, he returned to the country. When the Radical Civic Union split in 1957, he chose to belong to the People's Radical Civic Union. On that occasion he joined the unionist sector as a candidate for Vice President of the Nation, accompanying Miguel Ángel Zavala Ortiz, a formula that was defeated in the internal elections by the Ricardo Balbín-Santiago H. del Castillo duo. In 1960 he was again elected national deputy, but his mandate was interrupted by the 1962 military coup that overthrew President Arturo Frondizi.

He was ambassador of Argentina in Peru during the government of Dr. Arturo Illia.

== Writing career ==
In the world of journalism he was director of El Diario de Paraná, Nueva Palabra and La Voz de Mayo of Buenos Aires and La Montaña of Entre Ríos between 1930 and 1936. As a writer he is the author of poems, plays and essays. His works include Escuchemos ahora a los poetas (1956) and Los santos no van al cielo.

== See also ==
- Radical Civic Union
