= List of ambassadors of Peru to Argentina =

Ambassador of Peru to the Argentine Republic
- Great Seal of Peru
- Ministry of Foreign Affairs; Av. Del Libertador 1720, Buenos Aires
- Appointer: The president of Peru
- Inaugural holder: Manuel Blanco Encalada
- Formation: 1822
- Website: Embassy of Peru in Argentina

The extraordinary and plenipotentiary ambassador of Peru to the Argentine Republic is the official representative of the Republic of Peru to the Argentine Republic.

Both countries established relations in 1822, with both countries having come into existence as a result of Argentine-born José de San Martín's campaigns in the River Plate and Lower Peru during the Spanish American wars of independence. The first Peruvian representative to Argentina was Manuel Blanco Encalada. Relations have continued since, having been warm for the most part, with the exception of a scandal during the Cenepa War in 1995.

== List of representatives ==
Name	Portrait	Term begin	Term end	President	Notes
Manuel Blanco Encalada		1822	1823	José de San Martín	Plenipotentiary of Peru in Buenos Aires
Domingo Cáceres		1827	1827	Andrés de Santa Cruz	Chargé d'Affaires of Peru in Argentina
Manuel Falcón		1828	1828	José de la Mar	Secretary of the Legation
Buenaventura Seoane		1861	1862	Ramón Castilla	Resident Minister in Argentina and in Brazil
Benigno González Vigil		1864	1868	Juan Antonio Pezet	Chargé d'Affaires
José María La Torre Bueno		1869	1869	José Balta	Minister Resident of Peru in Argentina, Brazil and Uruguay
Luis Mesones		1870	1872	José Balta	Minister Resident
Manuel Irigoyen Larrea		1873; 1874	1873; 1877	Manuel Pardo	Minister Resident of Peru in Argentina, Brazil and Uruguay (1873); Envoy Extraordinary and Minister Plenipotentiary (1874–77)
Aníbal Víctor de la Torre		1878	1880	Mariano Ignacio Prado	Envoy Extraordinary and Minister Plenipotentiary to Argentina, Brazil and Uruguay
Evaristo Gómez Sánchez y Benavides		1880	1882	Nicolás de Piérola	Envoy Extraordinary and Minister Plenipotentiary to Argentina, Brazil and Uruguay
Carlos Maria Elías y de la Quintana		1882	1882	Disputed	Envoy Extraordinary and Minister Plenipotentiary to Argentina, Brazil and Uruguay
Manuel Ocampo Samanez		1882	1883	Disputed	Interim Chargé d'Affaires
Cesáreo Chacaltana Reyes		1883	1883	Disputed	Confidential Agent ad honorem of Peru close to the Government of the Argentine Republic
Pedro Paz Soldán y Unanue		1884	1884	Miguel Iglesias	Minister Resident in Argentina, Brazil and Uruguay
Juan Luna		1885	1885	Miguel Iglesias	Envoy Extraordinary and Minister Plenipotentiary to Argentina, Brazil and Uruguay
Cesáreo Chacaltana Reyes		1889	1892	Andrés Avelino Cáceres	Envoy Extraordinary and Minister Plenipotentiary to Argentina
Guillermo Seoane		1892	1893	Remigio Morales Bermúdez	Envoy Extraordinary and Minister Plenipotentiary
Alberto Ulloa Cisneros		1893	1894	Remigio Morales Bermúdez	Minister Resident in Argentina
Pedro A. de la Torre		1893	1896	Remigio Morales Bermúdez	Interim Chargé d'Affaires
Francisco Rosas Balcázar		1895	1899	Andrés Avelino Cáceres	Envoy Extraordinary and Minister Plenipotentiary
Víctor Eguiguren Escudero		1900	1902	Eduardo López de Romaña	Envoy Extraordinary and Minister Plenipotentiary
Ernesto de Tezanos Pinto		1902	1903	Eduardo López de Romaña	Interim Chargé d'Affaires
Ernesto de Tezanos Pinto		1902	1908	Eduardo López de Romaña	Envoy Extraordinary and Minister Plenipotentiary
Felipe de Osma y Pardo		1904	1904	Serapio Calderón	Minister Plenipotentiary on Special Mission
Javier Prado y Ugarteche		1904	1904	Serapio Calderón	Envoy Extraordinary and Minister Plenipotentiary
Víctor Manuel Maúrtua		1905	1906	José Pardo y Barreda	Ad hoc Minister Plenipotentiary
Enrique de la Riva-Agüero y Looz Corswaren		1907	1910	José Pardo y Barreda	Envoy Extraordinary and Minister Plenipotentiary
Carlos Álvarez Calderón		1910	1912	Augusto B. Leguía	Envoy Extraordinary and Minister Plenipotentiary
Juan Norberto Eléspuru		1912	1913	Augusto B. Leguía	Envoy Extraordinary and Minister Plenipotentiary
Manuel Elías Bonnemaison		1914	1915	Óscar R. Benavides	Interim Chargé d'Affaires
Augusto Durand Maldonado		1916	1918	José Pardo y Barreda	Envoy Extraordinary and Minister Plenipotentiary
Amador del Solar Cárdenas		1919	1919	José Pardo y Barreda	Envoy Extraordinary and Minister Plenipotentiary
Hernán Velarde		1920	1923	Augusto B. Leguía	Envoy Extraordinary and Minister Plenipotentiary
Manuel de Freyre y Santander		1924	1926	Augusto B. Leguía	Envoy Extraordinary and Minister Plenipotentiary
Miguel Antonio Checa Eguiguren		1927	1930	Augusto B. Leguía	Envoy Extraordinary and Minister Plenipotentiary
Felipe Barreda y Laos		1930	1941	Luis Miguel Sánchez Cerro	Envoy Extraordinary and Minister Plenipotentiary
Óscar R. Benavides		1941	1944	Manuel Prado Ugarteche	Envoy Extraordinary and Minister Plenipotentiary
José Jacinto Rada		1945	1945	Manuel Prado Ugarteche	Envoy Extraordinary and Minister Plenipotentiary
Carlos Ledgard Neuhaus		1946	1947	José Luis Bustamante y Rivero	Envoy Extraordinary and Minister Plenipotentiary
José Quesada Larrea		1947	1948	José Luis Bustamante y Rivero	Envoy Extraordinary and Minister Plenipotentiary
Antonio Luna Ferreccio		1949	1951	Manuel A. Odría	Envoy Extraordinary and Minister Plenipotentiary
José Jacinto Rada		1951	1954	Manuel A. Odría	Envoy Extraordinary and Minister Plenipotentiary
Hernán C. Bellido		1954	1961	Manuel A. Odría	Envoy Extraordinary and Minister Plenipotentiary
Guillermo Hoyos Osores		1961	1962	Manuel Prado Ugarteche	Envoy Extraordinary and Minister Plenipotentiary
Pedro Ugarteche Tizón		1962	1965	Manuel Prado Ugarteche	Envoy Extraordinary and Minister Plenipotentiary
Álvaro Rey de Castro		1965	1968	Fernando Belaúnde	Envoy Extraordinary and Minister Plenipotentiary
Gonzalo Fernández Puyó		1968	1974	Fernando Belaúnde	Envoy Extraordinary and Minister Plenipotentiary
Ricardo Vasi Verme		1974	1975	Juan Velasco Alvarado	Envoy Extraordinary and Minister Plenipotentiary
Felipe Valdivieso Belaúnde		1975	1979	Juan Velasco Alvarado	Envoy Extraordinary and Minister Plenipotentiary
Jorge Morelli Pando		1979	1980	Francisco Morales Bermúdez	Envoy Extraordinary and Minister Plenipotentiary
Guillermo Hoyos Osores		1980	1985	Fernando Belaúnde	Envoy Extraordinary and Minister Plenipotentiary
Alfonso Grados Bertorini		1986	1990	Alan García	Envoy Extraordinary and Minister Plenipotentiary
José Guzmán Herrera		1991	1993	Alberto Fujimori	Envoy Extraordinary and Minister Plenipotentiary
Alberto Ulloa Elías		1993	1997	Alberto Fujimori	Envoy Extraordinary and Minister Plenipotentiary
Hugo de Zela		1998	2002	Alberto Fujimori	Envoy Extraordinary and Minister Plenipotentiary
Martín Belaúnde Moreyra		2003	2006	Alejandro Toledo	Envoy Extraordinary and Minister Plenipotentiary
Judith de la Mata		2007	2011	Alan García	Envoy Extraordinary and Minister Plenipotentiary
Nicolás Lynch Gamero		August 25, 2011	November 3, 2012	Ollanta Humala	Envoy Extraordinary and Minister Plenipotentiary
José Luis Pérez Sánchez-Cerro		2012	2017	Ollanta Humala	Envoy Extraordinary and Minister Plenipotentiary
John Peter Camino Cannock		March 1, 2018	March 23, 2018	Pedro Pablo Kuczynski	Envoy Extraordinary and Minister Plenipotentiary

== See also ==
- List of ambassadors of Argentina to Peru
