= Goiás (disambiguation) =

Goiás is a Native Brazilian name, used by unspecified tribesmen to refer to themselves, derived from gua iá, "one like us".

The term may refer to:

- Goiás, a state in Brazil.
- Goiás, Goiás, a town in the state of Goiás.
- Goiás Esporte Clube, an association football club from the state of Goiás.

== See also ==
- Goia (disambiguation)
- Goya (disambiguation)
