= Anselmo Marini =

Argentine politician (1906–2002)

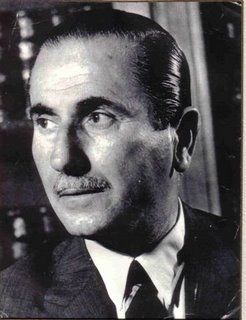

Ambassador of Argentina to Peru
- In office 1984 – June 1989
- Preceded by: Luis Pedro Sánchez Moreno
- Succeeded by: Julián Licastro

Personal details
- Born: November 18, 1906; La Plata, Argentina
- Died: February 14, 2002; La Plata, Argentina

Anselmo Marini (18 November 1906 – 14 February 2002) was an Argentine lawyer and politician who served as Governor of Buenos Aires between 1963 and 1966. Also he served as Ambassador of Argentina to Peru designated by President Raúl Alfonsín between 1984 and 1989. Also he was member of the Provincial and National Chamber of Deputies representing Buenos Aires province.

He was born in La Plata, where he earned a degree in law at the National University of La Plata. He was close to politician Ricardo Balbín.
