= Emanuel Dening =

Argentine football striker

Personal information
- Full name: Fernando Emanuel Dening
- Date of birth: July 4, 1988 (age 38)
- Place of birth: Goya, Argentina
- Position: Forward

Team information
- Current team: Ferro Carril Oeste

Youth career
- Boca Unidos

Senior career*
Years	Team	Apps	(Gls)
2009–2012	Newell's Old Boys	14	(0)
2011–2012	→ Guillermo Brown (loan)	1	(0)
2012–2013	Central Córdoba	6	(1)
2013–2014	Huracán Goya	23	(13)
2014–2015	Boca Unidos	70	(10)
2016–2017	San Martín SJ	41	(11)
2017–2018	Yeni Malatyaspor	22	(2)
2018–2019	Cerro Porteño	3	(0)
2019	San Martín SJ	9	(0)
2019–2020	Tigre	17	(8)
2020–2021	Enosis Neon Paralimni	34	(5)
2021–2022	Agropecuario	51	(15)
2023	San Martín Tucumán	35	(15)
2024	Şanlıurfaspor	17	(3)
2024	Patronato	19	(7)
2025–2026	San Miguel	33	(6)
2026–	Ferro Carril Oeste	4	(0)
- * Club domestic league appearances and goals as of 18:28, 11 April 2026 (UTC)

Fernando Emanuel Dening (born 4 July 1988 in Goya) is an Argentine football striker who plays for Ferro Carril Oeste.

== Career ==
Dening came through the Newell's Old Boys youth development system to make his debut on 21 August 2009 coming on as a 74th-minute substitute in a 0–1 away win against Independiente. He appeared as a substitute in several more games during the Apertura 2009 tournament.
