= Luis Miró Quesada Garland =

Peruvian architect, professor, essay writer and art critic

Luis Miro Quesada Garland
- Born: Luis Jose Antonio Miro Quesada Garland; May 14, 1914; Lima
- Died: September 14, 1994 (aged 80); Lima
- Education: National University of Engineering
- Occupation: Architect
- Parent(s): Luis Miro Quesada De la Guerra; Elvira Garland
- Projects: Huiracocha House

Luis Jose Antonio Miró Quesada Garland (May 14, 1914 – September 14, 1994) was a Peruvian architect, professor, essay writer, art critic and a promoter of modern architecture in Peru. He played an important part in the process of change in Lima, from a society rooted in tradition and academic canon into a modern one. His actions were key to the social and urban changes, related to modern architecture and art, which happened during the 1940s. He died on 1994 at the age of 80 in Lima, Peru.

== Early years and education ==
Luis Miró Quesada was born in the capital city of Lima on May 14, 1914. His father, Luis Miro Quesada de la Guerra (1880-1976), was a Peruvian politician, journalist and chief editor of El Comercio (Peru), one of the most important newspapers in Peru, who became Mayor of Lima from 1916 to 1918. He married Elvira Mercedes Garland Roel, a Lima socialite, in 1909. Luis Miro Quesada Garland attended Sagrados Corazones Recoleta School and then went to college to study Architecture at the former School of Engineers (National University of Engineering today) finishing in 1940. He married Leonor Valega Sayan and they had six children together. Years later he remarried Alicia Hudtwalcker Roose.

== Early professional years and "Espacio en el Tiempo" ==
As soon as he graduated from UNI (Spanish acronym for National University of Engineering), he designed the building for the city council of Miraflores, one of the most traditional districts in Lima. His proposal included two versions of the same building, one in neo colonial style and another one in modern style, thus beginning to show his creative process looking into a new architecture. Miro Quesada believed that the practice of architecture had become a repetitive gathering of traditional architectural elements and forms, due to the popularity of historicism at the end on the 18th century.

In 1945, Miro Quesada published the first book about Modern architecture in Peru: Espacio en el Tiempo. La arquitectura moderna como fenomeno cultural. Where he claims for modern culture and also attacks on historicist styles in the Peruvian architecture and culture. The book deals with topics of modern architecture, urban planning and art, stating that they need to be the “true expression of the new times.” Miro Quesada merged all his knowledge on the new architectural theories and articulated them in one clear message about the modern times. He justifies his views from a functionalist stand. Based on the Vitruvian triad as classic goals of architecture, he states that these need to be rethought in consideration to the cultural, social and technological changes of the 19th century.

- About firmness: needs to involve the new constructive methods and structural systems.
- About utility: needs to involve the new technology that can help control the effects of the weather in inner spaces, without being isolated from nature.
- About beauty: needs to be expressed as a result of the construction methods and the inner spaces and not as a result of aesthetic canons.

In addition to this universal theories on modern architecture, he is capable of linking them with Peruvian traditions, which allowed him to build a theory that exposed the values of new technology, local building patterns and the geometric abstraction of pre-Columbian cultures in new forms and spaces. This book is now considered to be the paper that drove the start of Modern architecture in Peru.

== Education Reform and Agrupacion Espacio ==
Also in 1945, the renewal of architectural doctrine started with the national reform in education that began during the government of President Jose Luis Bustamante and the creation of a Reform board in the School of Engineers which was directed by Peruvian architect Cordova and supported by students interested in the new architecture. The board asked Miro Quesada to join the Department of Architecture as a new professor. He joined the school in 1946 alongside other new professors who prepared new courses to teach such as his course called “Architectural Function Analysis”. Later, all these new courses were rearranged into a more coherent curricular plan by the board and student representatives, thus beginning the teaching of Modern architecture in Peru.

Agrupacion Espacio (Group Space) was formed shortly after the education reform, in 1947. The group was formed by students and architects under the leadership of Luis Miro Quesada. The group worked on the recognition and establishment of modern architecture in Peru, with its manifesto titled "Expresion de Principios de la Agrupacion Espacio", published by newspaper El Comercio and later in architectural magazine El Arquitecto Peruano. They expressed their frustration for the lack of a “modern” view of the architecture, art, culture and society in Peru, and claimed to fix such situation. These publications led to a series of meetings and conferences open to the general public about modernity. Also, they had a weekly article in newspaper El Comercio where the different problems concerning urban planning, architecture and art were exposed. At the same time the magazine Espacio started to be published. All these actions helped in the promotion and acceptance of a new urban planning and architecture.

== Huiracocha House ==
Architect Luis Miro Quesada brought into reality all his theories and ideas on Modern Architecture in a Peruvian context, with the design and construction of his own house: Huiracocha House. The house has the various architectural strategies, rehearsed in some of the greatest works of modern architecture, rethought to be inserted in the Peruvian context physically and culturally. This resulted in a house with a rich sensorial experience and a complex cultural significance. As a general concept, the house is planned as an introverted architecture inside a single volume of broad and fluid spaces, defined by the furniture and their use and not by their physical limits.

=== Architectural form and program ===
From the outside it shows that the facade has a broad base that is closed to the outside and which also houses inner spaces opened to the backyard. The volume’s mass is a remembrance from the “visual” weight that the colonial houses had. In addition, it can be seen the influence of Le Corbusier’s Villa Savoye because of the long horizontal window on the second story, framed by a continuous balcony, and the curved walls on the roof. Also, as in Le Corbusier’s Villa Stein, he places the patio in the roof, going against the traditional first floor patio. Miro Quesada employed a cylindrical volume to connect every floor with a spiral staircase as a reference to Mies van der Rohe’s Tugendhat House (1930) in order to have an important vertical reinforcement. On the inside, one of the most complex spaces is located in the first floor. The division of spaces between the main living room, hall and the dining room is made by architectural elements, which at the same time maintain their visual link, as circular columns, steps and curved walls.

=== Materials ===
The materials used, aside from the reinforced concrete, includes bricks and stone boulders (traditional construction materials in Lima) which are used to reinforce the horizontality of the house based on Wright’s theories on architectural tectonics. In the windows, he employed the traditional work of wood using wide frames in order to have broader window panes. Miro Quesada also looked for the integration of art and architecture in his work, idea popularized as Gesamtkunstwerk (Wagner, 1849) by the Bauhaus school, established in 1991 by Walter Gropius. The Peruvian architect integrated an artwork, made in stained glass, and paintings on the walls by Peruvian artist Fernando de Szyszlo and a steel sculpture made by Peruvian artist Cesar Campos on the roof. He also used Peruvian traditional furniture inside the house alongside modern furniture.

== Instituto de Arte Contemporaneo (IAC) ==
The Institute of Contemporary Art (Instituto de Arte Contemporaneo) was originally known as Galeria de Lima and changed in 1946. It became one of the most used building for the promotion of the statements made by Agrupacion Espacio in 1947. Miro Quesada, regarding art expressions as painting, had a different point of view from architecture in which he supported the philosophy of the art for the art’s sake and the search for beauty against the supporters of social artistry as he stated in Arte en Debate published on 1966. He promoted the value of universal art in comparison to another style growing at the same time called Indigenismo, which valued the local expressions on art.

== Selected works ==
- Radio El Sol building (1953)
- El Angel Cemetery (1957)
- Plaza de Toros de Acho (Remodeling) (1944)
- El Comercio Office Building in Pando (1984)
- Workshop for artist Fernando de Szyslo
