= Goya (moth) =

Scientific classification
- Domain: Eukaryota
- Kingdom: Animalia
- Phylum: Arthropoda
- Class: Insecta
- Order: Lepidoptera
- Family: Pyralidae
- Subfamily: Phycitinae
- Genus: Goya; Ragonot, 1888

Type species
- Goya albivenella

Synonyms
- Atopothoures A. Blanchard, 1975

Genus of moths

Goya is a genus of snout moths. It was described by Émile Louis Ragonot in 1888.

== Species ==
There are four recognized species:

- Goya albivenella Ragonot, 1888
- Goya ovaliger (A. Blanchard, 1975)
- Goya simulata J. C. Shaffer, 1989
- Goya stictella (Hampson, 1918)
