= Diógenes Taboada =

Argentine politician (1887–1978)

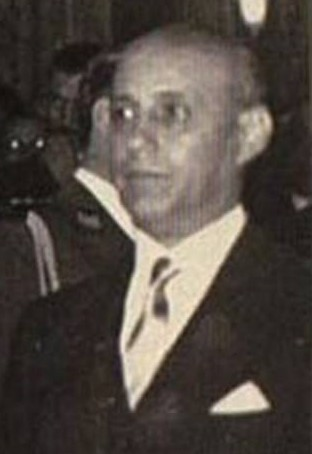

Minister of the Interior
- In office February 20, 1938 – September 2, 1940
- President: Roberto M. Ortiz
- Preceded by: Manuel Ramón Alvarado
- Succeeded by: Miguel Culaciati

Minister of Foreign Affairs
- In office May 22, 1959 – April 28, 1961
- President: Arturo Frondizi
- Preceded by: Carlos Florit
- Succeeded by: Adolfo Mugica

Personal details
- Born: 1887 Ojo del Río, Argentina
- Died: April 11, 1978 Buenos Aires, Argentina
- Party: UCR (1912–1924/1946–1957); UCRA (1924–1946); UCRI (1957–1963)
- Education: University of Buenos Aires
- Awards: Order of the Sun of Peru; Order of Isabella the Catholic

Diógenes Taboada (Ojo del Río, 1887 — Buenos Aires, April 11, 1978) was an Argentine lawyer and politician, who served as Minister of the Interior under President Roberto M. Ortiz and as Minister of Foreign Affairs under President Arturo Frondizi twenty years later.

== Biography ==
He completed his secondary studies in the city of Córdoba and received his law degree from the University of Buenos Aires. From his early youth he belonged to the Radical Civic Union (UCR).

In 1917 he was Minister of Finance of the San Luis Province, during the administration of Governor Carlos Alric. Three years later he was elected national deputy for his province. He was a supporter of the anti-personalist faction of the UCR.

In 1925 he was appointed general administrator of Internal Taxes of the Nation and, the following year, president of the National Postal Savings Bank.

In 1938 he was appointed Minister of the Interior by President Roberto Marcelino Ortiz; His main concern was to end the regime of electoral fraud that predominated in his time—the so-called Infamous Decade—and that had allowed Ortiz himself to become president. He ordered federal interventions in the provinces of Catamarca and Buenos Aires, displacing the most enthusiastic promoter of the "patriotic fraud," Governor Manuel Fresco.

After the 1943 Argentine coup d'état he was one of the most prominent leaders of anti-personalism, and was one of the main organizers of the March of the Constitution and Freedom of September 19, 1945.

During the government of Juan Domingo Perón he joined the Radical Civic Union, in the fraction that would be the Intransigent Radical Civic Union (UCRI). He supported the policy of later president Arturo Frondizi, who in May 1958 appointed him his Minister of Foreign Affairs.

During his administration, he attended the Fifth Consultation Meeting of Ministers of Foreign Affairs, in which he did not have a notable participation, since the most vexing issue was the Cuban Revolution and its possible export to other countries in the Caribbean Sea, and the situation caused by the dictatorship in the Dominican Republic. In the month of July, the chancellor notified Fidel Castro's government of his concern about the growing influence of the Soviet Union in that country.

In April 1961, the announcement of the Alliance for Progress by U.S. President John F. Kennedy took place, which was received with skepticism by all of Latin America, with the exception of the government of President Frondizi, who declared himself the biggest admirer of the policy. Minister Taboada also showed no enthusiasm for the announcement, and—in any case—he left office at the end of that month.

During the rest of Frondizi's government, Taboada served as ambassador to Uruguay and Peru.
