= Goya (surname) =

Goya is a surname. Notable people with the surname include:

- Chantal Goya (born 1942), French singer and actress
- Estanislao Goya (born 1988), Argentine professional golfer
- Francis Goya (born 1946), born Francis Weyer, Belgian romantic guitarist and composer
- Francisco Goya (1746–1828), Spanish romantic painter and printmaker
- Nand Lal Goya (1633–1713), Persian and Arabic poet in the Punjab region. Goya was a title conferred on Bhai Nand Lal by Sri Guru Gobind Singh and it means one who is eloquent with words.
- Safeway Goya, born Fred de Rafols, American musician, lead singer of The Nobodys
- Tito Goya (1951–1985), Puerto Rican actor
