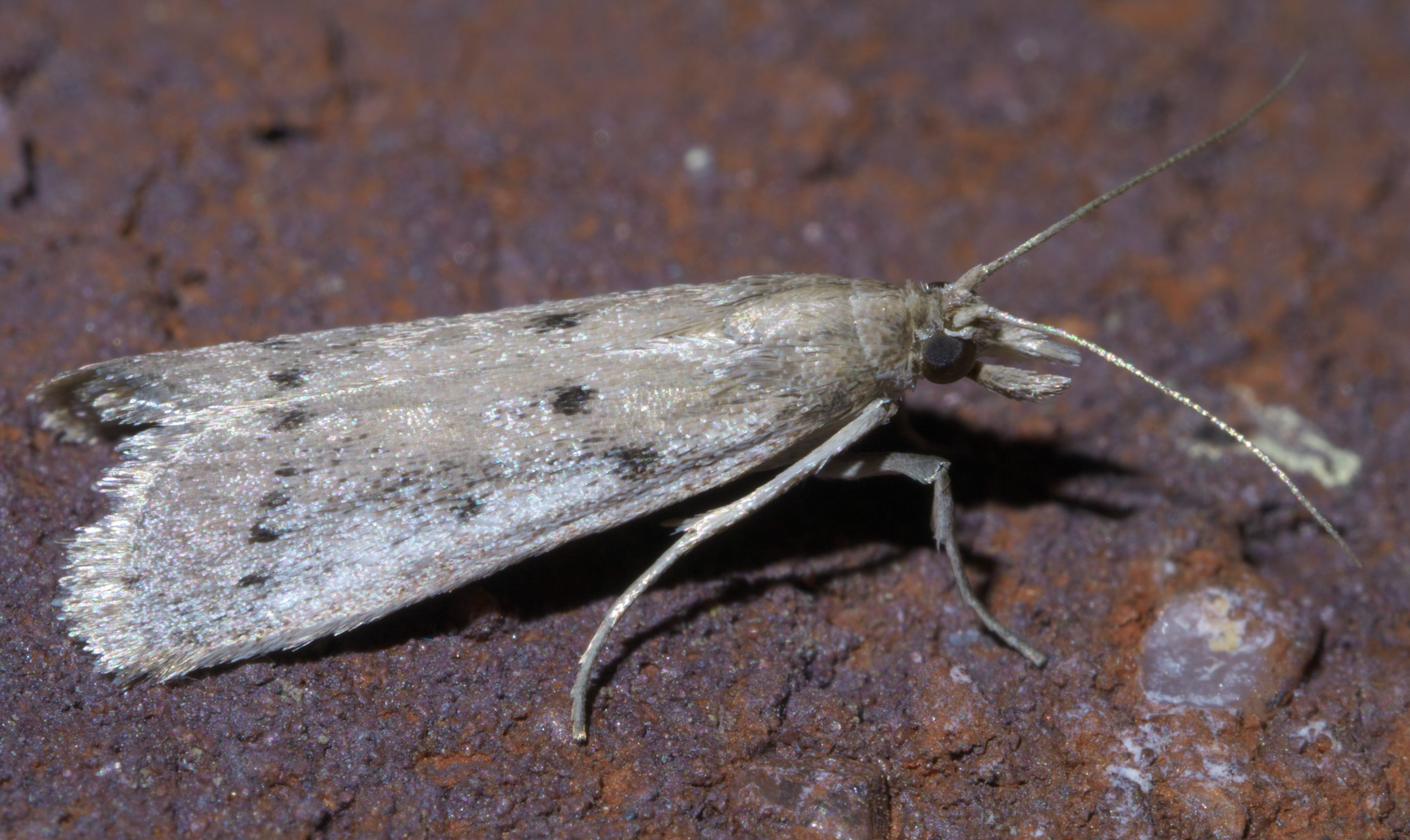

Scientific classification
- Kingdom: Animalia
- Phylum: Arthropoda
- Clade: Pancrustacea
- Class: Insecta
- Order: Lepidoptera
- Family: Pyralidae
- Genus: Goya
- Species: G. stictella

Binomial name
- Goya stictella (Hampson, 1918)

Synonyms
- Saluria stictella Hampson, 1918

= Goya stictella =

Species of moth

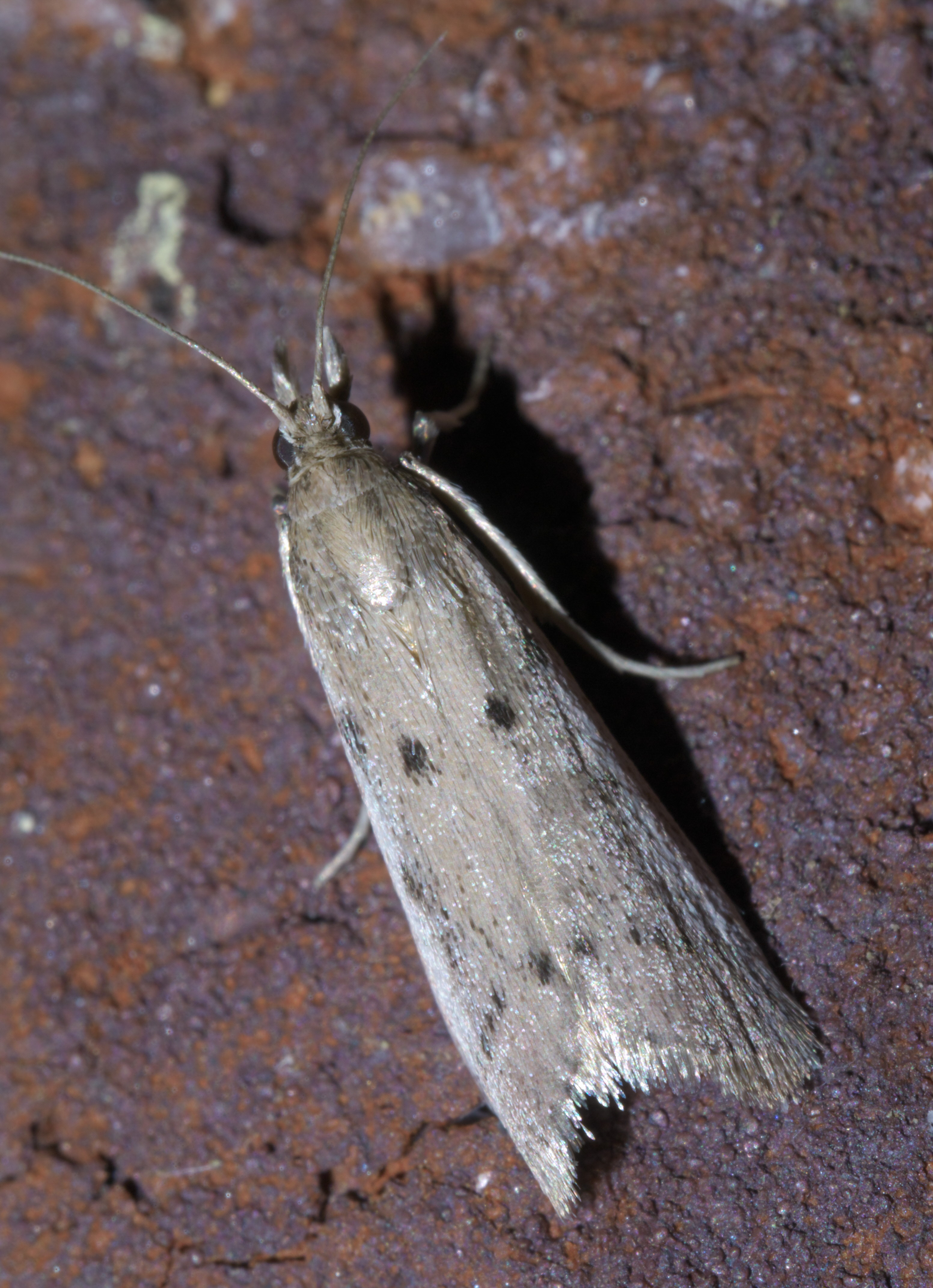
Goya stictella, size: 10.4 mm

Goya stictella is a species of moth belonging to the family Pyralidae. It is found in Florida, Illinois, Oklahoma, Tennessee, Arkansas and Mississippi and on the Bahamas.
