= Goya, Argentina =

Goya Gója
- City
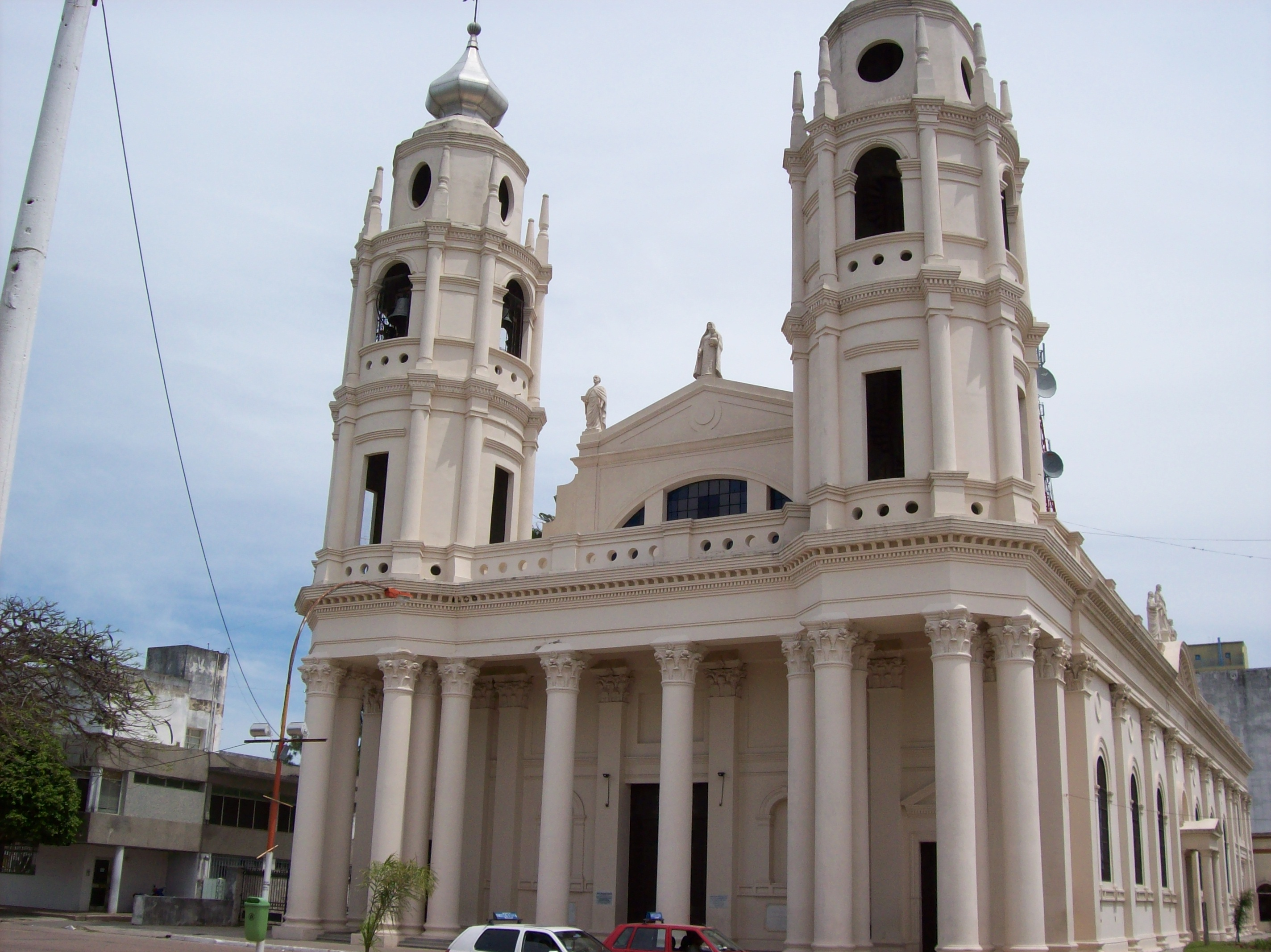

- Location of Goya in Argentina
- Coordinates: 29°8′S 59°15′W
- Country: Argentina
- Province: Corrientes
- Department: Goya
- Founded: 1807

Government
  - Intendant: Mariano Hormaechea
- Elevation: 62 m (203 ft)

Population (2022 census)
  - Total: 88,949
  - Rank: 2nd in Corrientes
- Demonym: goyano
- Time zone: UTC−3 (ART)
- CPA base: W3450
- Dialing code: +54 3777
- Website: Official website

Goya (Guarani: Gója) is a city in the south-west of the province of Corrientes in the Argentine Mesopotamia. It has about 106,368 inhabitants as of the 2022 census [INDEC].

The city lies on the eastern shore of the Paraná River, opposite Reconquista, Santa Fe, 218 kilometres south from the provincial capital (Corrientes) and 715 kilometres north-northwest from Buenos Aires.

Goya hosts the annual National Festival of the Surubí, which includes an internationally known fishing contest. The surubí is a popular large catfish of the Paraná.

== Origin of its name and history ==
The city of Goya originated from the purchase of land at the site by Gregoria Morales and her husband, Bernardo Olivera, in 1771. The city does not have foundation act and, in agreement with the oral tradition, its name is owed to the enterprising Gregoria Morales' nickname: Doña Goya. Following the couple's settlement in the proximities of the present "costanera" (riverfront), she opened a general store upon her arrival, and per historian José M. Cabrer, tradition held that this lady made exquisite cheeses, with the milk of cows fed with reedbeds and coconuts. Her canned goods were, in turn, purchased by visitors and merchants plying the Paraná River, popularizing the name of the delicacies to the extent that, by 1801, the site was popularly known as "Goya Port."

The settlement was informally established as such in 1807, and the local cathedral, Our Lady of the Rosary, was consecrated in 1884. Among Goya's historical anecdotes is having been where Camila O'Gorman and her forbidden love, Father Ladislao Gutiérrez, sought refuge; the couple were apprehended and executed in 1848.

== Swallows ==
In November migratory swallows arrive in Argentina from North America. According to local custom the swallows that come to Goya are from San Juan Capistrano, California. Local custom says the swallows arrive in Goya on November 24, having left San Juan Capistrano on October 23, following the Pacific coast on an 11,000 kilometer journey. When arriving in Goya, the swallows (golondrinas) are received with a series of festivals at the Monument to the swallows located in San Martín Square, one of the birds' preferred nesting places. The return to Capistrano of the first swallows begins around February 18, to arrive in California around the traditional date of March 19 every year. This particular event encouraged the mayors of Goya and San Juan Capistrano to sign a declaration of brotherhood between the two cities in 1985; President Raúl Alfonsín contributed a framed Argentine flag in commemoration of the event to San Juan Capistrano.

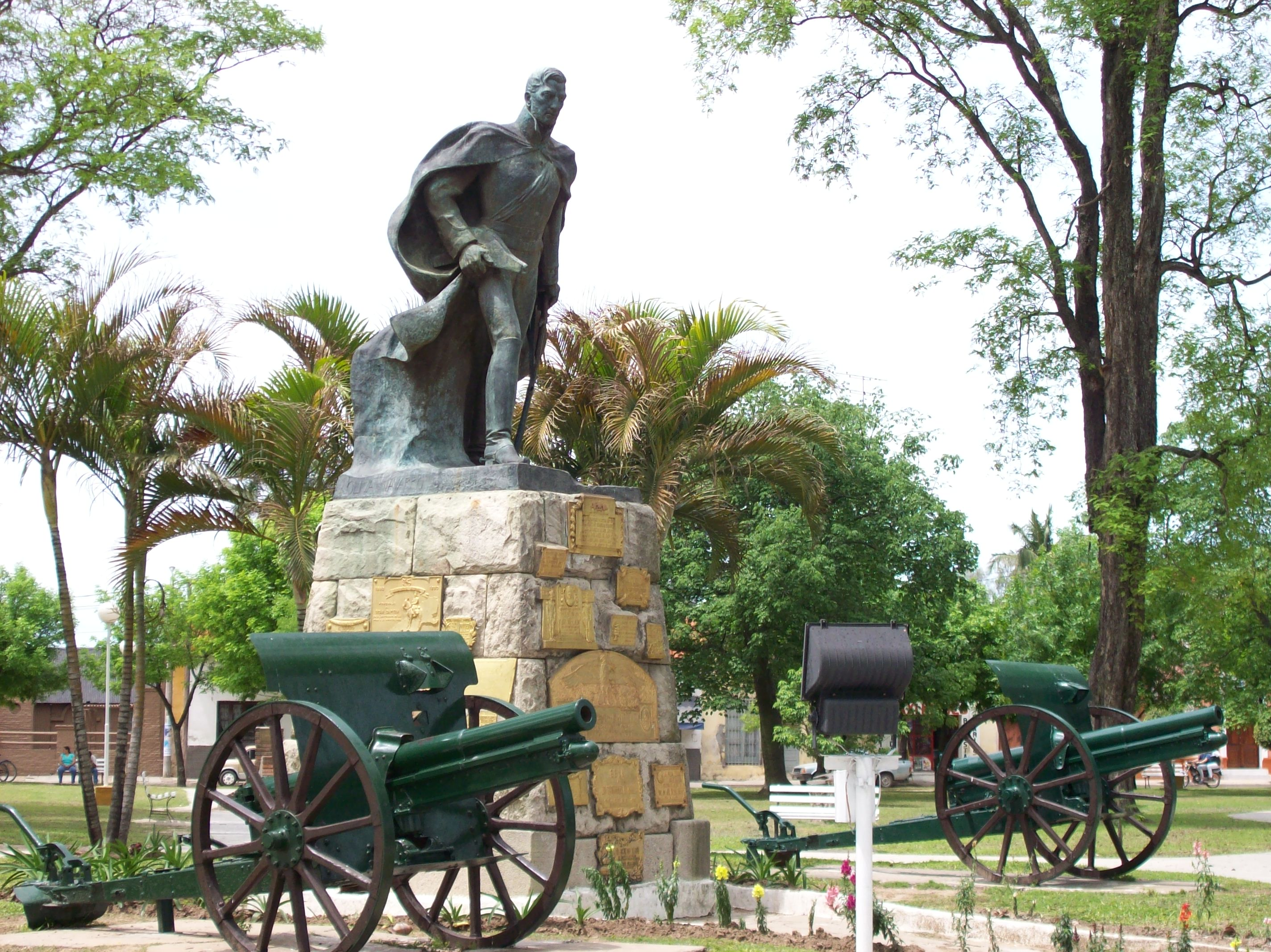
San Martín Plaza

== Notable people ==
- José Tiburcio Borda, (Spanish Wiki) (1869–1936), psychiatrist
- Armando Noguera, (French wiki) (born 1977), baritone singer
- Ramón Antonio Mora y Araujo (1869–1936), diplomat

=== Sport ===
- Pedro Monzón (born 1962), 1990 FIFA World Cup player and manager
- Horacio Ramón Cardozo (born 1979), football player
- Federico Kammerichs (born 1980), former basketball player
- Emanuel Dening (born 1988), football striker
- Emmanuel Ojeda (born 1997), professional footballer
- Kevin Zenon (born 2001) professional footballer
