= Escuela Naval Militar (Argentina) =

Naval academy

The Escuela Naval Militar is the naval military academy of the Argentine Navy. The purpose of the institution is to form the future Argentinian navy officials. It was created in October 1872 by a law promoted by President Domingo Faustino Sarmiento, following the necessity of having an institution to train future sailors in Argentina.

The first director was Clodomiro Urtubey. Throughout its history the academy had many locations, from the ship Vapor Almirante Brown to the corvette Uruguay. The current location is near to the Río Santiago Shipyard in Ensenada, Buenos Aires Province since 1900 and the current building was constructed in 1937.

The academy offers military and naval training and the Navy officers they also graduate with a degree in areas related to sea. The facilities include also a big campus with a planetarium, ship simulator and a museum.
