= Goya Department =

Goya Department Departamento Goya (Spanish) Tetãvore Gója (Guarani)
- Department
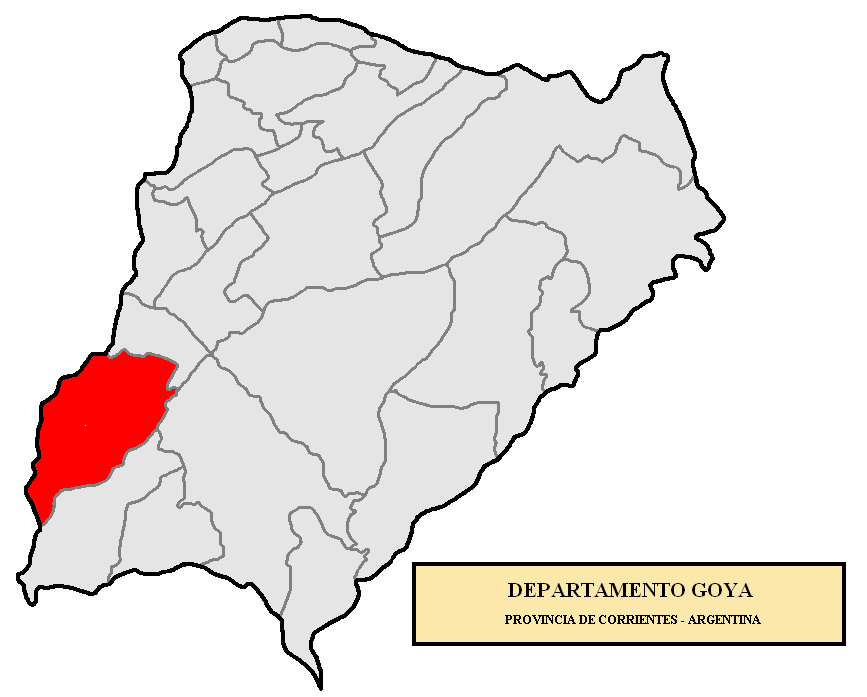
- location of Goya Department in Corrientes Province
- Coordinates: 29°09′S 59°15′W
- Country: Argentina
- Seat: Goya

Area
  - Total: 4,678 km^{2} (1,806 sq mi)

Population (2001 census [INDEC])
  - Total: 87,349
  - Density: 18.67/km^{2} (48.36/sq mi)
- Demonym: Goyana/o
- Postal Code: W3450
- Area Code: 03777
- Website: www.goya.gov.ar

Goya Department is a department of Corrientes Province in Argentina.

The provincial subdivision has a population of about 87,349 inhabitants in an area of 4,678 km^{2} (1,806 sq mi), and its capital city is Goya, which is the second most populous city in Corrientes Province. It is located around 815 km (506 mi) from Capital Federal.
