= Roberto Levillier =

Argentine historian and diplomat (1886–1969)

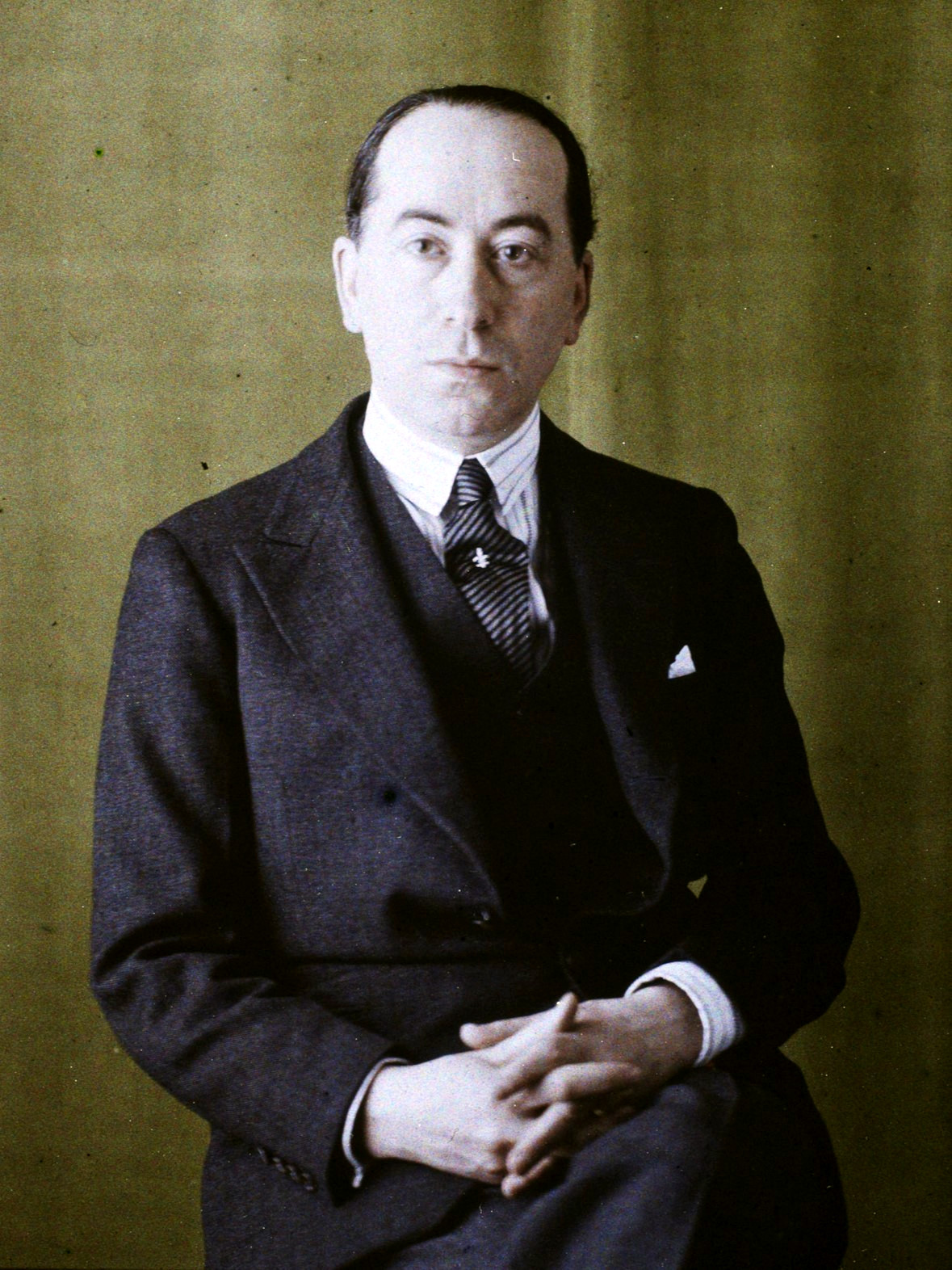
- Autochrome by Georges Chevalier, 1928

Ambassador of Argentina to Uruguay
- In office 1938–1941

Ambassador of Argentina to Mexico
- In office 1935–1937

Minister Plenipotentiary of Argentina to Czechoslovakia (Concurrent in Finland, Poland and the USSR)
- In office June 16, 1928 – 1934
- Preceded by: Hilarión Moreno
- Succeeded by: José A. Caballero

Ambassador of Argentina to Peru
- In office 1922–1926

Personal details
- Born: 1881 or 1886 Buenos Aires, Argentina
- Died: March 19, 1969 Buenos Aires, Argentina

Roberto Levillier (1881/1886 — March 19, 1969) was an Argentine historian and diplomat.

== Biography ==
Levillier served as a diplomat in different countries in Europe (Spain, Portugal, Poland, Czechoslovakia, Finland, the Soviet Union) and in Peru. In 1920 he was part of the Argentine delegation that participated in the first assembly of the League of Nations, along with Marcelo Torcuato de Alvear and Honorio Pueyrredón. Between 1935 and 1937 he was ambassador to Mexico. Between 1938 and 1941 he was ambassador to Uruguay. Despite his initial sympathy for the National Socialist regime, during his stay in Europe he provided aid to persecuted Jews.

From a young age he became interested in historiography, publishing his Nueva crónica de la conquista del Tucumán; The first volume was published in Madrid in 1926, with the following two volumes from the years 1930 and 1932.

In 1942, after retiring from diplomatic activity, he devoted himself fully to historical work. His interest lay in the period of conquest and colony, from a point of view sympathetic to the conquerors and unfavorable to the native peoples. He dedicated himself especially to the compilation and publication of unpublished documents. He stated that Américo Vespucci had arrived at the Río de la Plata. In 1955 he earned a place for life in the National Academy of History of Argentina.

A street in the city of Buenos Aires, another in Córdoba and another in Santiago del Estero bear his name.

== Selected works ==
=== Historiography ===
- Antecedentes de política económica en el Río de la Plata: documentos originales de los siglos XVI al XIX, Madrid: Tip. "Sucesores de Rivadeneyra", 1915.
- Santo Toribio Alfonso Mogrovejo, Arzobispo de los Reyes (1581-1606). Organizador de la Iglesia en el Virreinato del Perú. Madrid, 1920.
- Nueva crónica de la conquista del Tucumán. 3 volumes. Madrid, 1926.
- Papeles Eclesiásticos del Tucumán. 2 volumes. Madrid, Imprenta de Juan Pueyo, 1926.
- Biografía de los conquistadores de la Argentina en el siglo XVI. Madrid, Imprenta de Juan Pueyo, 1928.
- Francisco de Aguirre y los orígenes del Tucumán, 1550-1570. Madrid, Imprenta de Juan Pueyo, 1930.
- García de Castro, Lope, Despatch, Lima, Mar. 6, 1565, Gobernantes del Perú, cartas y papeles, Siglo xvi, Documentos del Archivo de Indias, Colección de Publicaciones Históricas de la Biblioteca del Congreso Argentino, ed. Roberto Levillier, 14 volumes., Madrid, 1921–6. In Hemming.
- Don Francisco De Toledo, supremo organizador del Perú, su vida, su obra (1515–1582). Buenos Aires: Porter hnos., 1935–1940.
- Descubrimiento y Población del Norte Argentino por españoles del Perú. Desde la entrada al Tucumán hasta la fundación de Santiago del Estero 1543-1553. Espasa-Calpe, Buenos Aires, 1943.
- Guerras y conquistas en Tucumán y Cuyo. Imprenta Porter hnos. Buenos Aires, 1945
- Americo Vespucio. Ediciones Cultura Hispánica. Madrid, 1966.
- Enciclopedia de Historia Argentina, 5 tomos. Plaza & Janes S.A. Editores Argentina, Buenos Aires, 1968.

=== Theatre ===
- La tienda de los espejos. Editorial Saturnino Calleja, Buenos Aires, 1921.
- Rumbo Sur, 1937
- Estampas Virreinales Americanas. E. Calpe 1939.
- Amor Con Dolor Se Paga. E. Calpe 1944.
