= List of ambassadors of Argentina to the United States =

Ambassadors of Argentina to the U.S.

Ambassador of Argentina to the United States
- Embajador de Argentina a los Estados Unidos
- Style: His Excellency
- Residence: Washington, D.C.
- Appointer: President of Argentina
- Inaugural holder: Carlos María de Alvear

The Ambassador of Argentina to the United States is the Ambassador Extraordinary and Plenipotentiary of the Argentine Republic to the United States of America.

The Ambassador is Argentina's foremost diplomatic representative to the United States, and Chief of Mission in Washington, D.C.

== History ==
Diplomatic relations have existed between the United States and Argentina at the ambassadorial level since December 27, 1823, when Caesar Augustus Rodney, President James Monroe's envoy, presented his credentials to the government of Martín Rodríguez.

In 1832, when Juan Manuel de Rosas came to power in Argentina, he appointed Carlos María de Alvear as minister to the United States to resolve a conflict between the two governments in the Falkland Islands.

== Chiefs of mission ==
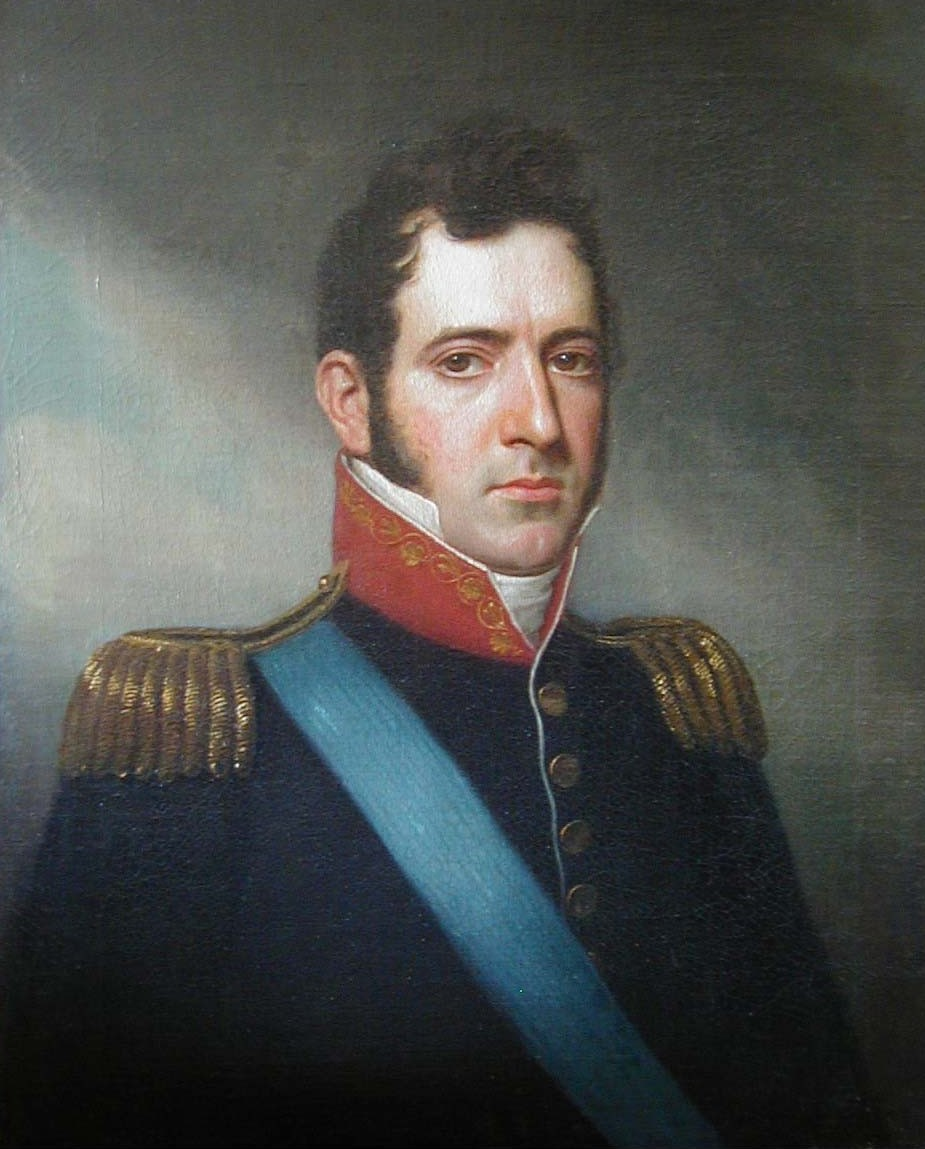
Don Carlos María de Alvear

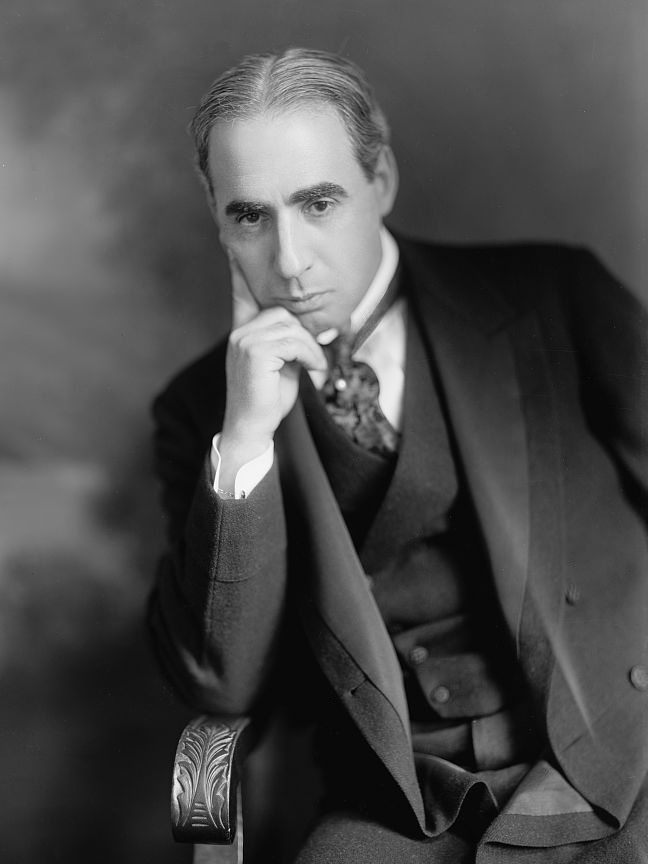
Rómulo Sebastián Naón

=== Ministers ===
- 1824–1835: Carlos María de Alvear
- 1838–1864: Carlos María de Alvear
- 1863–1868: Domingo Faustino Sarmiento
- 1868–1870: Manuel Rafael García Aguirre
- 1880–1881: Bartolomé Mitre Vedia
- 1881–1884: Luis Lorenzo Domínguez
- 1884–1885: Carlos Carranza
- 1885–1890: Vicente G. Quesada
- 1890–1892: Roque Sáenz Peña
- 1892–1893: Rafael García Mansilla
- 1893–1895: Estanislao Zeballos
- 1895–1896: Vicente J. Domínguez
- 1896–1899: Martín García Mérou
- 1899–1900: Antonio del Viso
- 1900–1901: Eduardo Wilde
- 1901–1901: Antonio del Viso
- 1901–1905: Martín García Mérou
- 1905–1910: Epifanio Portela
- 1910–1914: Rómulo Sebastián Naón

=== Ambassadors ===
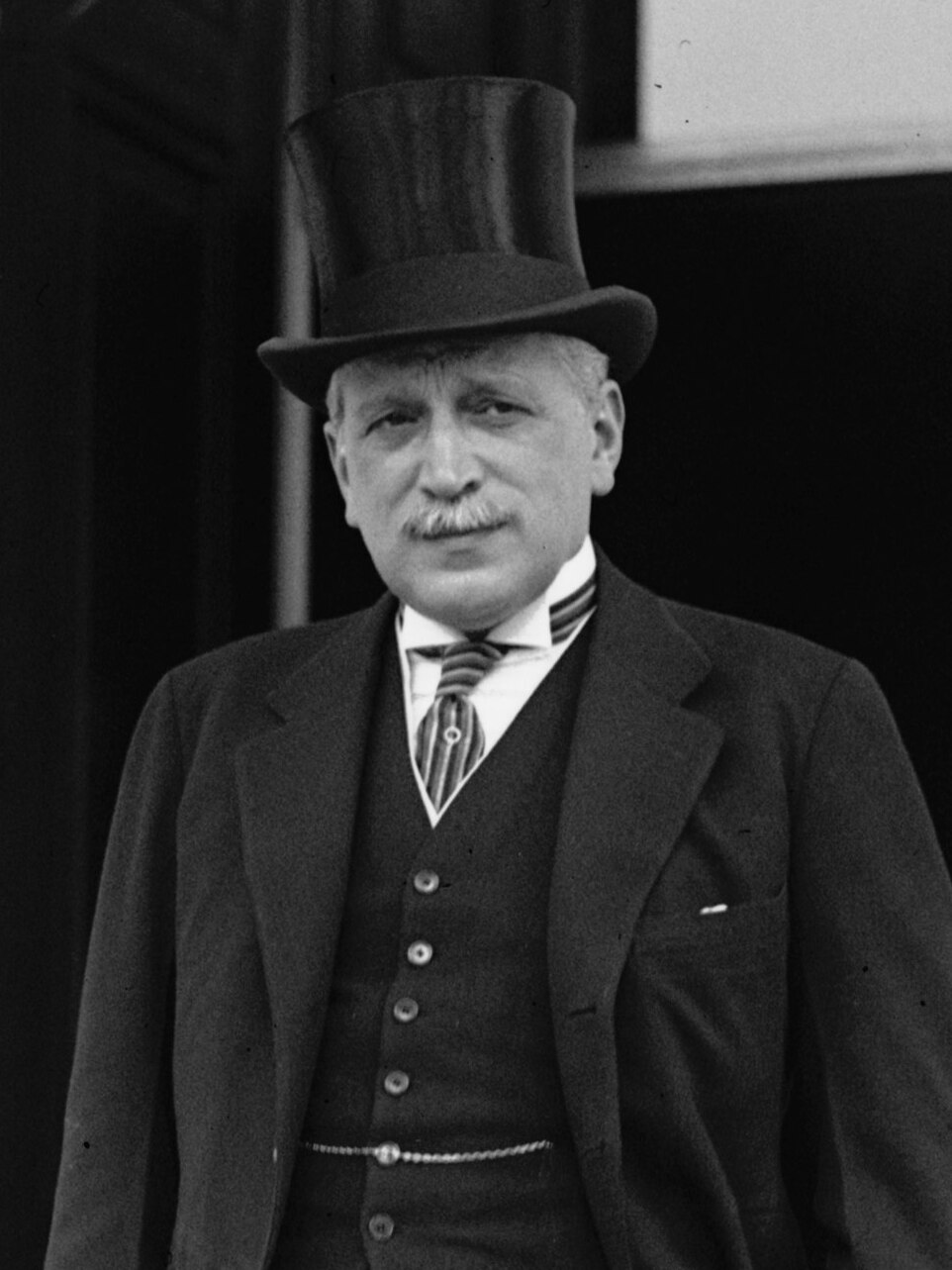
Tomás Le Breton in 1922

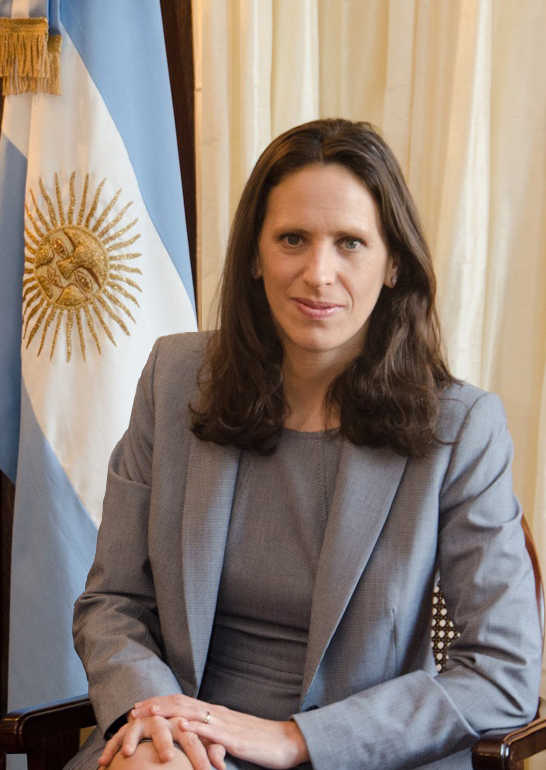
Cecilia Nahón

- 1914–1919: Rómulo Sebastián Naón
- 1919–1922: Tomás Le Breton
- 1922–1924: Felipe Aja Espil
- 1924–1928: Honorio Pueyrredon
- 1928–1928: Conrado Traverso
- 1928–1928: Felipe Aja Espil
- 1928–1928: Julian Enciso
- 1928–1928: Manuel Malbrán
- 1928–1928: Julian Enciso
- 1928–1931: Manuel Malbrán
- 1931–1943: Felipe Aja Espil
- 1944–1944: Adrián César Escobar
- 1944–1945: No representative
- 1945–1945: Rodolfo Garcia Arias
- 1945–1945: Oscar Ibarra García
- 1945–1946: Luis Santiago Luti
- 1946–1948: Oscar Ivanissevich
- 1948–1948: Martín Luis Drago
- 1948–1951: Jerónimo Remorino
- 1951–1955: Hipólito Jesús Paz
- 1955–1957: Adolfo Ángel Vicchi
- 1957–1958: Mauricio Yadarola
- 1958–1959: César Barros Hurtado
- 1959–1962: Emilio Donato del Carril
- 1962–1964: Roberto Alemann
- 1964–1966: Norberto Miguel Barrenechea
- 1966–1968: Álvaro Alsogaray
- 1968–1970: Eduardo A. Roca
- 1970–1971: Pedro Eduardo Real
- 1971–1973: Carlos Manuel Muñiz
- 1973–1975: Alejandro José Luis Orfila
- 1975–1976: Rafael Maximiliano Vázquez
- 1976–1976: Arnaldo T. Musich
- 1977–1981: Jorge Antonio Aja Espil
- 1981–1982: Esteban Arpad Takacs
- 1982–1986: Lucio García del Solar
- 1986–1989: Enrique Candioti
- 1989–1991: Guido Di Tella
- 1991–1993: Carlos Ortiz de Rozas
- 1993–1997: Raúl Granillo Ocampo
- 1997–1999: Diego Ramiro Guelar
- 2000–2002: Guillermo Enrique González
- 2002–2003: Diego Ramiro Guelar
- 2003–2003: Eduardo Amadeo
- 2003–2008: José Octavio Bordón
- 2008–2010: Héctor Timerman
- 2010–2011: Alfredo Chiaradía
- 2011–2013: Jorge Argüello
- 2013–2015: Cecilia Nahón
- 2015–2017: Martín Lousteau
- 2017–2019: Fernando Oris de Roa
- 2020–2023: Jorge Argüello
- 2023—2024: Gerardo Werthein
- 2023—2025: Alec Oxenford

== See also ==
- Embassy of Argentina, Washington, D.C.
- United States Ambassador to Argentina
- Argentina – United States relations
