= List of ambassadors of Argentina to Germany =

Coordinates: 52.501162°N 13.344672°E

Ambassador of Argentina to Germany
- Inaugural holder: Ferdinand David Schlüter
- Formation: 1852

The Argentine ambassador in Berlin is the official representative of the Government in Buenos Aires to the Government of Germany.

== List of representatives ==
Diplomatic agrément/Diplomatic accreditation	Ambassador	Observations	President of Argentina	Chancellor of Germany	Term end
1852	Ferdinand David Schlüter	Consul in Hamburg	Justo José de Urquiza	Frederick William IV of Prussia	1853
1852	Augusto Borchers	Consul in Bremen	Justo José de Urquiza	Frederick William IV of Prussia	
1853	Augusto Milberg	Consul in Hamburg	Justo José de Urquiza	Frederick William IV of Prussia	1854
1853	Federico Eduardo Schutt	Konsul in Lübeck	Justo José de Urquiza	Frederick William IV of Prussia	
1855	Pablo Gutike	Consul in Berlin	Justo José de Urquiza	Frederick William IV of Prussia	
1854	Theodor Garzen	Consul in Hamburg-Altona	Justo José de Urquiza	Frederick William IV of Prussia	
1854	HJ Harlos	Consul in Hamburg	Justo José de Urquiza	Frederick William IV of Prussia	1856
1855	Delfín Bonifacio Huergo Saravia		Justo José de Urquiza	Frederick William IV of Prussia	
1856	Daniel Ley	Consul in Munich	Justo José de Urquiza	Frederick William IV of Prussia	
1857	David Osterreich	Consul in Rhineland	Justo José de Urquiza	Frederick William IV of Prussia	
1858	JL Wuthoff	Consul in Hamburg	Justo José de Urquiza	William I, German Emperor	
1860	Enrique Lorens	Consul in Hamburg	Santiago Derqui	William I, German Emperor	
1860	Jorge Richjene	Consul in Cologne (Germany)	Santiago Derqui	William I, German Emperor	
1862	Federico Möller	Consul in Kassel.	Bartolomé Mitre	William I, German Emperor	
1879	Mariano Balcarce	was accredited in Rome, Vienna, Brüssel and Lisbon.	Nicolás Avellaneda	William I, German Emperor	
1882	Miguel Cané	until 1886 when Manuel García, Héctor Álvarez and Agustín Arroyo were accredited in Vienna also accredited in Vienna.	Julio Argentino Roca	William I, German Emperor	
1883	Carlos Calvo		Julio Argentino Roca	William I, German Emperor	
1890	Ernesto Bosch		Carlos Pellegrini	Wilhelm II, German Emperor	1892
1898	General Lucio V. Mansilla	(*December 24, 1831; † October 8, 1913 in París)	Julio Argentino Roca	Wilhelm II, German Emperor	
1899	Felipe Calvari	(† 1899)	Julio Argentino Roca	Wilhelm II, German Emperor	
1902	Vicente Gaspar Quesada		Julio Argentino Roca	Wilhelm II, German Emperor	
1905	Martín García Mérou	(* October 14, 1862 in Buenos Aires;† May 30, 1905 in Berlín)	Manuel Quintana	Wilhelm II, German Emperor	1905
1905	Indalecio Gómez		Manuel Quintana	Wilhelm II, German Emperor	
1910	Luis B. Molina		Roque Sáenz Peña	Wilhelm II, German Emperor	
1925	Federico M. Quintana		Marcelo Torcuato de Alvear	Hans Luther	
1928	Ernesto Restelli	(*April 1, 1884)	Hipólito Yrigoyen	Hermann Müller (politician)	September 30, 1932
1932	Eduardo Labougle Carranza		Agustín Pedro Justo	Franz von Papen	1939
1939	Ricardo Olivera (1886–1949)		Roberto María Ortiz	Adolf Hitler	1942
1942	Luis Santiago Luti	Charge d Affairs	Ramón Castillo	Adolf Hitler	January 29, 1944
1950	Luis Herman Irigoyen		Juan Perón	Konrad Adenauer	
1952	Luis Herman Irigoyen		Juan Perón	Konrad Adenauer	1956
1956	Eduardo Labougle Carranza		Eduardo Lonardi	Konrad Adenauer	1957
1957	Carlos Indalecio Gomez		Eduardo Lonardi	Konrad Adenauer	1958
1958	Hector D'Andrea		Arturo Frondizi	Konrad Adenauer	1959
1959	Gualterio Enrique Ahrens		Arturo Frondizi	Konrad Adenauer	1963
1964	Luis Herman Irigoyen		Arturo Umberto Illia	Ludwig Erhard	1970
1971	Enrique Ruiz Guiñazú y Cantilo	Son of Enrique José Luis Ruiz Guiñazú (*February 20, 1909)	Alejandro Agustín Lanusse	Willy Brandt	1973
1973	Rafael Maximiliano Vasquez		Héctor José Cámpora	Willy Brandt	1975
1976	Enrique Ruiz Guiñazú y Cantilo		Jorge Rafael Videla	Helmut Schmidt	1978
1978	Roberto Enrique Guyer		Jorge Rafael Videla	Helmut Schmidt	1984
1984	Hugo Boatti Ossorio		Raúl Alfonsín	Helmut Kohl	1989
1989	Carlos Alfredo Mandry		Carlos Menem	Helmut Kohl	1991
1991	Roberto Enrique Guyer		Carlos Menem	Helmut Kohl	1994
1994	Carlos Oscar Keller Sarmiento		Carlos Menem	Helmut Kohl	1998
September 2, 1998	Andrés Guillermo Pesci Bourel	(*1938; † July 11, 2005)	Carlos Menem	Helmut Kohl	2000
2000	Enrique J.A. Candioti		Fernando de la Rúa	Gerhard Schröder	2006
2006	Guillermo Nielsen	(*April 20, 1951 in Buenos Aires)	Néstor Kirchner	Angela Merkel	2007
2010	Victorio Taccetti	(*January 22, 1943 in Buenos Aires)	Cristina Fernández de Kirchner	Angela Merkel	2015
September 6, 2013	Daniel Adán Dziewezo Polski	From July 31, 2005 to January 1, 2010de 2010 he was Argentine Ambassador to Japan	Cristina Fernández de Kirchner	Angela Merkel	2015

- Argentina–Germany relations
