= Timerman =

Timerman is a surname. Notable people with the surname include:

- Héctor Timerman (1953–2018), Argentine journalist, politician, human rights activist, and diplomat
- Jacobo Timerman (1923–1999), Soviet-born Argentine publisher, journalist, and author
