= Jorge Vázquez (diplomat) =

Argentine politician (1943–2007)

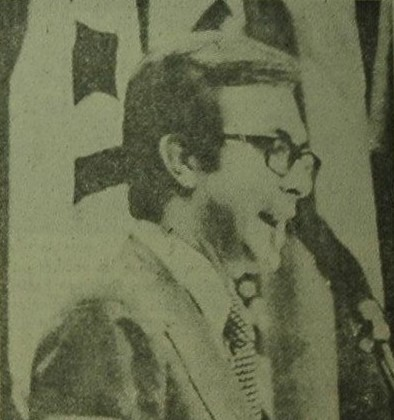

Ambassador of Argentina to Peru
- In office 2002–2004
- Preceded by: Víctor Martínez

Ambassador of Argentina to Switzerland
- In office 1998 – 1999
- Preceded by: Guillermo Enrique González
- Succeeded by: Miguel Ángel Espeche Gil

Ambassador of Argentina to Chile
- In office 1997–1998
- Preceded by: Eduardo Héctor Iglesias
- Succeeded by: Alejandro Mosquera

Permanent Representative of Argentina to the United Nations
- In office –
- Preceded by: Marcelo Delpech
- Succeeded by: Emilio Cárdenas

Ambassador of Argentina to the Dominican Republic
- In office 1983–1989

Under-Secretary of Foreign Affairs of the Argentine Nation
- In office –
- President: Héctor J. Cámpora

Personal details
- Born: 1943 San Francisco, Argentina
- Died: March 17, 2007 Buenos Aires, Argentina
- Party: Justicialist Party
- Education: Catholic University of Córdoba; Georgetown University

Jorge Alberto Vázquez Agodino (San Francisco, 1943 — Buenos Aires, March 17, 2007) was an Argentine diplomat and politician.

== Early life ==
He was born in San Francisco in the province of Córdoba. He studied a degree in Political and Social Sciences and Diplomacy at the Catholic University of Córdoba, graduating in 1965. There he was the president of the student federation. The following year, he pursued graduate studies at Georgetown University and in 1967 he entered the Argentine Foreign Service. He fulfilled functions within the Ministry of Foreign Affairs and in the Argentine embassies in the Netherlands and Chile.

== Career ==
=== Under-Secretary of Foreign Affairs ===
A Peronist militant, in 1973, President Héctor José Cámpora appointed him Under-Secretary of Foreign Affairs, being only 30 years old. During that time, he was Argentine representative before the third General Assembly of the Organization of American States (OAS), which was held in Lima (Peru) in June and July of that year.

On June 21, he gave a speech that condemned U.S. foreign policy, identifying it as the main cause of the "deformation" of the inter-American system, and proposed revising the TIAR to adapt it to political multipolarism and ideological pluralism. He also criticised the bureaucracy of Latin American governments, which he described as "sleepy" and "complacent," and directed criticism at the OAS itself, which he described as "an instrument of North American policy [...] that until now only "It has caused us bitterness and frustration." Vázquez's tone was consistent with that used by President Cámpora in his criticism of the operation of the OAS.

He also demanded the reincorporation of Cuba, the virtual exclusion of the United States from the OAS, and the sovereignty rights of Panama over the canal zone under U.S. occupation. After his speech, several Latin American diplomats congratulated him, while U.S. ambassador Joseph J. Jova was the first to leave the premises. Days later, the Undersecretary of State for Inter-American Affairs, John Kubisch, responded, denying the accusations about U.S. hegemonic pretensions over Latin America.

Internally, Vázquez received the support of the National and Latin American Movement, while senators from the Radical Civic Union asked the Executive Branch to review the TIAR. The magazine Las bases, which was influenced by José López Rega, also supported Vázquez's position.

=== 1976 coup d'état ===
After the coup d'état of the self-proclaimed National Reorganization Process, he was detained aboard the ship 33 Orientales, moored in the port of Buenos Aires. There he shared a cell with Carlos Menem. He was released in 1978. Previously, in June 1976 he was sanctioned by the Junta, being deprived of political rights and disqualified from holding public office. The sanction also affected former president María Estela Martínez de Perón and other Peronist leaders.

=== Ambassadorship ===
In 1975 he had joined the Permanent Assembly for Human Rights. After the return to democracy, President Raúl Alfonsín appointed him ambassador to the Dominican Republic, being then the youngest representative of the Argentine Foreign Ministry.

In 1989, Carlos Menem appointed him permanent representative of Argentina at the United Nations. Along with other officials such as Juan Carlos Olima, Alfredo Chiaradía and Jorge Taiana, he opposed the policy implemented by the Menemist Foreign Minister Guido Di Tella, who proposed in 1991 that Argentina abandon its traditional third-world and anti-American position in the U.N. General Assembly to get closer to the United States votes. Di Tella threatened him that he had to obtain a 60% vote coincidence with the United States in the next General Assembly, if he wanted to retain the position of representative to the U.N.

Vázquez had also expressed his opposition to the pro-American bias of Menem's first chancellor, Domingo Cavallo. He resigned in September 1992, due to differences with the then Minister of Economy Cavallo regarding the privatization process of public companies.

In the 1995 elections he joined the Frente País Solidario (FREPASO), being a candidate for vice-governor of the province of Buenos Aires along with Carlos Auyero, of the Christian Democracy. The formula came in second place, obtaining almost 20% of the votes.

In 1997, he was appointed ambassador to Chile. He was removed from office for public statements made towards a journalist from the newspaper La Nación. In 1998 he was appointed ambassador to Switzerland.

In 2002 Eduardo Duhalde appointed him ambassador to Peru. Upon taking office he apologised on behalf of the Argentine State for the case of the illegal sale of weapons to Ecuador.

== Death ==
He died in March 2007 at the age of 64, after suffering from health issues.

== Personal life ==
Married to Elisabet Celina Amsler, he was the father of model María Vázquez, who is married to polo player Adolfo Cambiaso, as well as three sons: Facundo, Diógenes and Jorge.
