= José Arce =

Argentine physician, politician and diplomat (1881–1968)

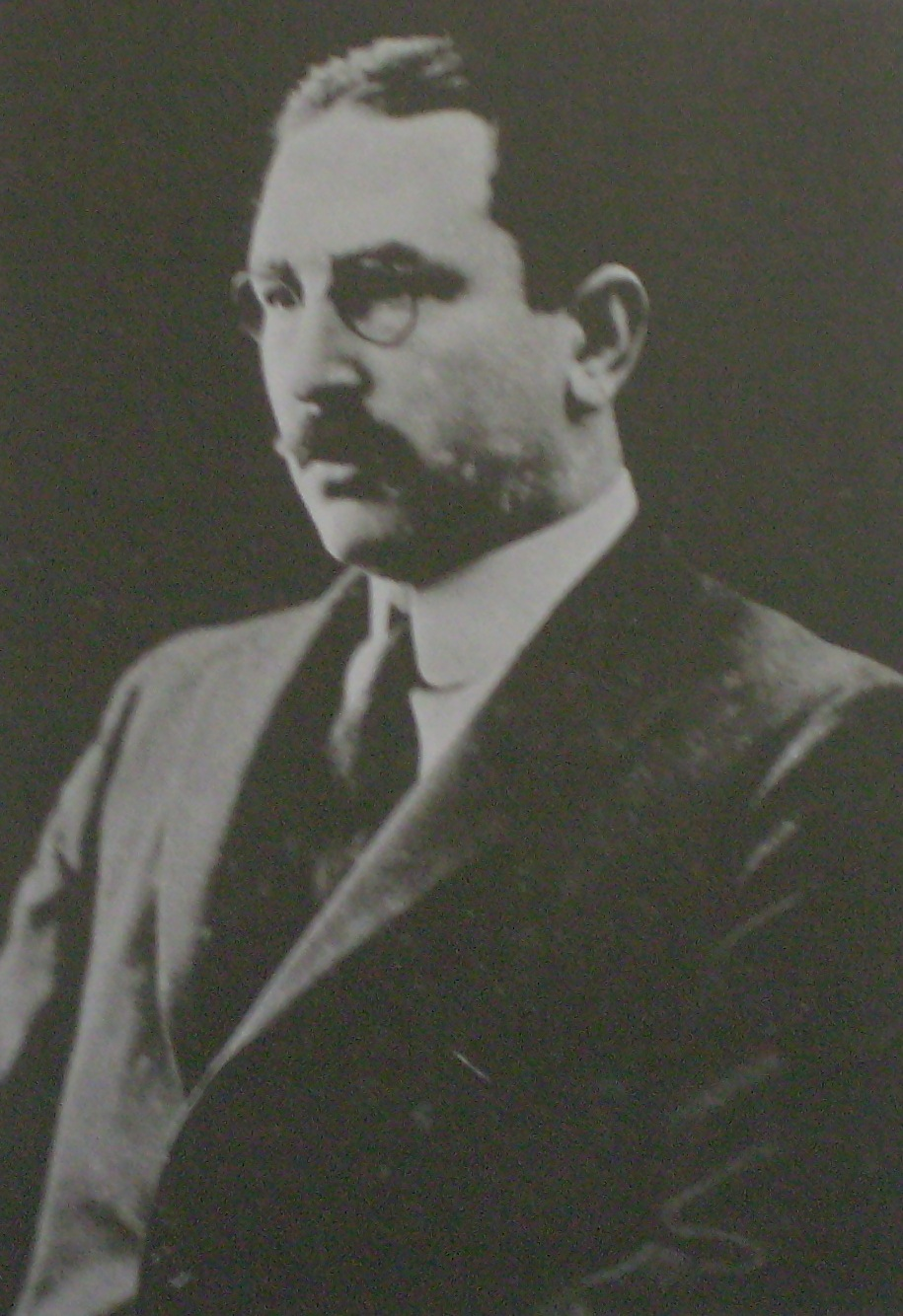

1st Permanent Representative of Argentina to the United Nations
- In office 1946–1950
- President: Juan Perón

President of the United Nations General Assembly
- In office April 16, 1948 – September 21, 1948
- Preceded by: Oswaldo Aranha
- Succeeded by: H. V. Evatt

Ambassador of Argentina to China
- In office 1945–1946
- President: Edelmiro Julián Farrell

Member of the Chamber of Deputies for Buenos Aires Province
- In office 1913–1920; 1924–1928; 1934–1938

Personal details
- Born: October 15, 1881 Lobería Partido, Argentina
- Died: July 15, 1968 (aged 86) Buenos Aires, Argentina
- Education: University of Buenos Aires, 1903
- Occupation: Physician, politician, diplomat

José Arce (15 October 1881 – 27 July 1968) was an Argentine physician, politician and diplomat. He held the position of the President of the United Nations General Assembly during the Second special session of the United Nations General Assembly - between 16 April 1948 and 21 September 1948.

Arce was born at the Estancia 'La Independencia' in Lobería and was baptised at Balcarce (full name Marcos Jose Arce). At just fifteen he began studying at the Medicine Faculty of the University of Buenos Aires, from which he graduated as a doctor in 1903 with the gold medal for his class. He became a surgeon and professor of Anatomy at the University at just 25 years old. He also was professor of Surgery and represented the country in 1907 at the Latin American Medical Congress in Montevideo.

In 1909, Arce entered politics, becoming a city legislator of Buenos Aires until 1913, serving as chairman in 1912. Continuing his medical career, he was President of the Medical Society of Argentina in 1911. In 1913, Arce was elected to the Argentine Chamber of Deputies, serving from 1913 to 1920, 1924 to 1928 and 1934 to 1938, representing Buenos Aires Province. He proposed the law creating the Faculty of Economics of UBA. He was Rector of UBA from 1922 to 1926. In 1926, now President of the Chamber of Deputies, he moved the law that created the current building for the Faculty of Medicine.

In 1945, Arce became Ambassador to Shanghai, and he was the Permanent Representative of Argentina to the UN for the period 1946-1949, during which time Argentina was a member of the Security Council 1948-49 and Arce was the President of the 1948 Special Session held in Paris, regarding the situation in Palestine. As a postage stamp collector Arce proposed that the United Nations should also issue them, an idea that was followed through in 1951 when the United Nations Postal Administration was created.

During the government of Juan Perón, he left for exile in Madrid and the United States. He wrote several books including a three-volume autobiography, a book dedicated to Francisco Franco and a manifesto for the return of the Falkland Islands to Argentine control.

Arce had one daughter, who died aged 14 in Paris in 1922. Some days later, he donated his books to the faculty library which was named 'María Antonieta Arce' in his daughter's memory. He donated his house in Buenos Aires to become a museum dedicated to President Julio Roca. He received many honours from universities and governments across the world.

== Awards and honors ==
- 1903 Receives the Gold Medal by the excelecia in their studies.
- 1922 The French government named him Officer of the Legion of Honor .
- 1924 Alfonso XIII gives the insignia of Knight Grand Cross of the Civil Order of Alfonso XII
- 1924 Receives honorary degree from the University of Madrid.
- 1925 He was appointed Commander of the Order of the Crown in Italy.
- 1927 The French government promoted Commander of the Legion of Honor.
- 1927 Receives the Gold Medal at the University of Hamburg.
- 1932 He was appointed Commander of the Order of the Star in Romania.
- 1933 Carol King granted the Grand Cross of the Order of the Crown of Romania.
- 1935 He was appointed Commander of the Order of Merit in Chile.
- 1935 He was appointed Commander of the Order of the Sun in Peru.
- 1937 He was appointed Commander of the Order of Cruzeiro in Brazil.
- 1938 Named Grand Officer of the Order of Cruzeiro in Brazil.
- 1939 Named Grand Officer of the Order of Merit in Chile.
- 1941 will deliver the Grand Cross of the Order of Alfonso X the Wise in Spain.
- 1941 Receives National Award in Applied Science to Medicine book by preoperative pneumothorax.
- 1943 He was appointed Commander of the Order of the Liberator in Venezuela.
- 1943 He was appointed Commander of the Order of Vasco Nunez de Balboa in Panama.
- 1949 Receives the Grand Cross of the Order of Merit in Chile.

Diplomatic posts
Preceded by Oswaldo Aranha	President of the United Nations General Assembly; 1948	Succeeded by Herbert Vere Evatt
