= María del Carmen Squeff =

Argentine diplomat

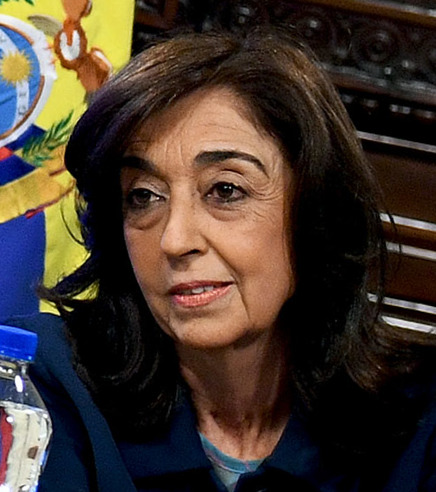
- Squeff in 2018

Permanent Representative of Argentina to the United Nations
- In office 31 August 2020 – 10 December 2023
- Appointed by: Alberto Fernández
- Preceded by: Martín García Moritán

Ambassador of Argentina to Nigeria
- In office February 2019 – November 2019
- President: Mauricio Macri

Ambassador of Argentina to France
- In office February 2014 – February 2016
- President: Cristina Fernández de Kirchner; Mauricio Macri
- Preceded by: Aldo Ferrer
- Succeeded by: Jorge Faurie

Personal details
- Born: 26 October 1955 (age 70) Rosario, Santa Fe
- Education: National University of Rosario; Université libre de Bruxelles
- Occupation: Diplomat

María "Marilita" del Carmen Squeff (born October 26, 1955) is an Argentine diplomat. She is the Permanent Representative of Argentina to the United Nations. She previously served as the Ambassador to Nigeria in 2019 and as the Ambassador to France from 2014 to 2016. In December 2019, she was appointed undersecretary for Mercosur and international economic negotiations of the Ministry of Foreign Affairs, International Trade and Worship.

== Early life and education ==
María del Carmen Squeff was born in 1955 in Rosario, Santa Fe. She earned a degree in political science from the National University of Rosario and a master's degree in international politics from the Faculty of Social, Political and Economic Sciences of the Université libre de Bruxelles. She was a history and geography teacher in secondary education.

== Career ==
Squeff entered the foreign service in 1991, holding positions as the chief of staff of the undersecretariat of economic integration and Mercosur, and in the Latin American economic integration directorate of the Ministry of Foreign Affairs.

Squeff held positions in the commercial section of the Argentine mission to the European Union in Brussels, between 1995 and 2000, and several positions in the mission to the Food and Agriculture Organization of the United Nations (FAO) in Rome, between 2005 and 2011, being deputy permanent representative of Argentina, chair of the Committee on World Food Security and member of the FAO Program Committee.

Between 2011 and 2014, Squeff served as Undersecretary of Foreign Policy of the Ministry of Foreign Affairs, International Trade and Worship. In June 2013, she led a mission to Ivory Coast, Cameroon and Senegal accompanied by officials and technicians from the then Ministry of Agriculture, Livestock and Fisheries, to encourage South-South technical cooperation.

In February 2014, Squeff was appointed ambassador to France by President Cristina Fernández de Kirchner. On March 19, 2015, she presented her credentials to the Principality of Monaco as concurrent ambassador. She left the embassy in Paris in early 2016, following the appointment of Jorge Faurie as ambassador.

In 2016 and 2017 Squeff was part of the Organization of American States peace mission in Colombia. In September 2018, President Mauricio Macri appointed her as Argentina's ambassador to Nigeria, presenting her credentials to Nigerian President Muhammadu Buhari in January 2019. In December 2019, she was appointed undersecretary for Mercosur and international economic negotiations of the Ministry of Foreign Affairs, International Trade and Worship.

Squeff was appointed Permanent Representative of Argentina to the United Nations by Alberto Fernández in August 2020.

Squeff taught at the Universidad del Salvador, University of Bologna and the University of Buenos Aires."
