= Cecilia Nahón =

Argentine economist and diplomat

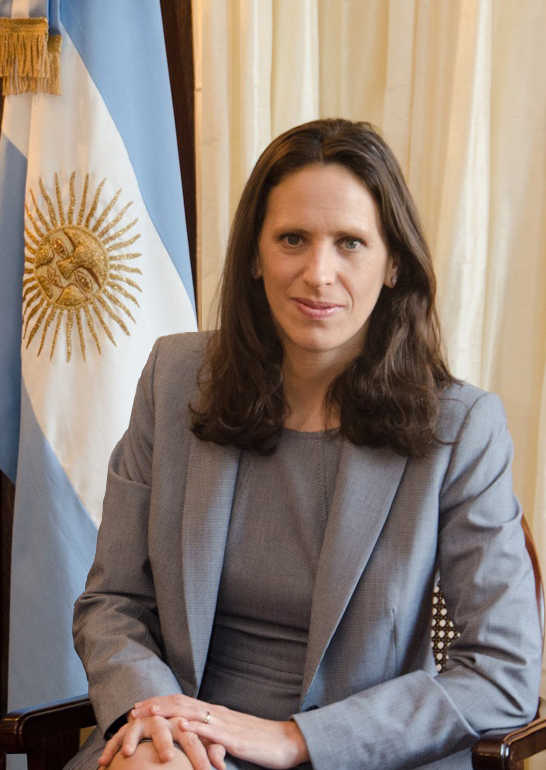

Argentine Ambassador to the United States
- In office 19 February 2013 – 10 December 2015
- President: Cristina Fernández de Kirchner
- Preceded by: Jorge Argüello
- Succeeded by: Martín Lousteau

Secretary of International Economic Relations
- In office 10 December 2011 – 17 December 2012
- President: Cristina Fernández de Kirchner
- Preceded by: Luis María Kreckler
- Succeeded by: Carlos Alberto Bianco

Personal details
- Born: María Cecilia Nahón; 17 May 1974 (age 52) Buenos Aires, Argentina
- Party: Justicialist Party
- Other political affiliations: Front for Victory
- Spouse: Sergio García Gómez
- Education: Latin American Social Sciences Institute
- Occupation: Economist, diplomat, politician, professor

María Cecilia Nahón (born 17 May 1974) is an Argentine economist, diplomat, and politician who served as Ambassador of Argentina to the United States from 2013 to 2015.

Previously, she had worked as the Secretary of International Economic Relations at the Ministry of Foreign Affairs and Worship.

== Career ==
Cecilia Nahón was born in Buenos Aires on 17 May 1974. She graduated from the Colegio Nacional de Buenos Aires and earned a licentiate in Economics from the University of Buenos Aires (UBA). She also holds a Master of Science in Development from the London School of Economics (LSE) and a PhD in Social Sciences from the Latin American Social Sciences Institute (FLACSO). Her thesis at FLACSO was La financiación externa y el desarrollo económico en América Latina: los casos de Argentina y México en los años noventa (External Financing and Economic Development in Latin America: The Cases of Argentina and Mexico in the 1990s). There she was also a teacher and researcher.

Nahón is the political goddaughter of Axel Kicillof, former Minister of Economy. She is a personal friend of his and godmother of one of his children. With him she founded the university group TNT at the UBA Faculty of Economic Sciences and the Center of Studies for Argentine Development. In addition, she is affiliated with the youth organization La Cámpora.

Nahón was a professor at the National University of Quilmes and a CONICET scholar. She served as a strategic planning analyst for the IRSA Group. From May 2008 to 2010 she worked as Investment Strategy and Environment Manager at the National Agency for Investment Development.

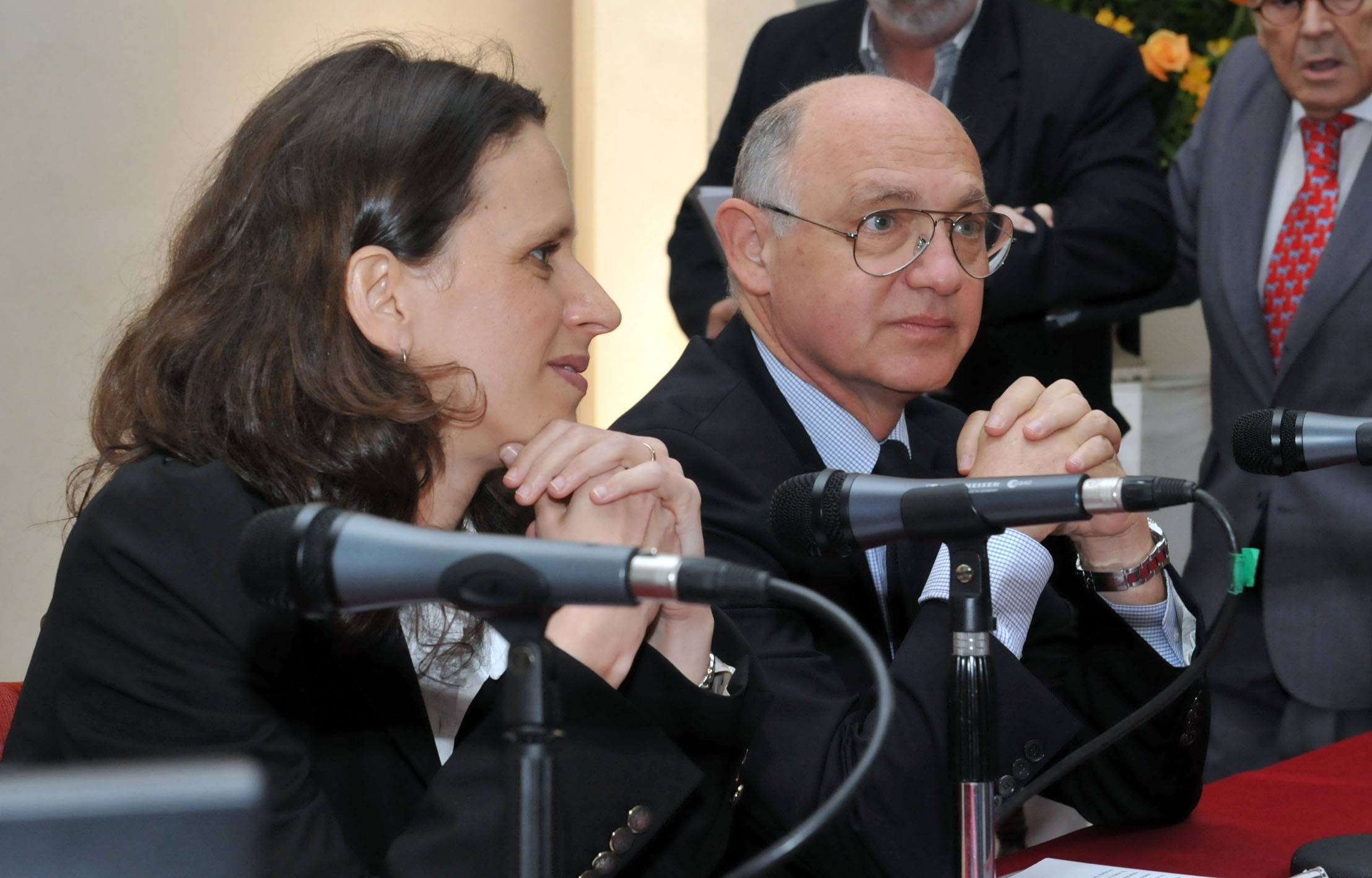
Nahón with Héctor Timerman in 2012

In 2010, she was appointed Undersecretary of Investment Development of the Argentine Foreign Ministry, and in December 2011 she was appointed head of its Secretariat of Commerce and Economic Relations to replace Luis María Kreckler.

During that time, she served as the delegate of Argentina in the G20, in charge of representation before the World Trade Organization. She also acted as national coordinator of the Mercosur Common Market Group and as secretary of the board of directors of Fundación Exportar.

On 17 December 2012, she was appointed ambassador of Argentina to the United States, officially presenting her credentials on 19 February 2013. She replaced Jorge Argüello, who was appointed ambassador to Portugal.

During her tenure as ambassador, Nahón was active in defending the Argentine position during negotiations with vulture funds, continually sending letters to US congressmen and senators. She met with the United States Department of State to obtain support from the US government.

She was also responsible for asking the US government for the whereabouts of Jaime Stiuso and for responding to the US press in the face of criticism of Argentina's policy. She was a guest speaker at the Center for Politics and participated in Columbia University's Initiative for Policy Dialogue and the Jubilee USA Network.

In September 2015, she published a notice in the Huffington Post on the Argentine position on the Falkland Islands sovereignty dispute.

In late November 2015, Nahón announced her farewell to the Argentine embassy. She did not return to Argentina, since her husband works in Washington, D.C. and their children go to school there. Chargé d'affaires Carlos Mascias was temporarily placed in charge of the embassy. In December 2015, Mauricio Macri appointed Martín Lousteau to the position.

She currently works as an adjunct professor at American University's Washington College of Law where she founded their Model G20 program.

== Personal life ==
Cecilia Nahón is married to Sergio García Gómez (who served as manager at Aerolíneas Argentinas) and has two children. In 2014 her husband was appointed as an adviser at the Mexican embassy in Washington, D.C.
