= Cağaloğlu Anatolian High School =

- Cağaloğlu Anadolu Lisesi
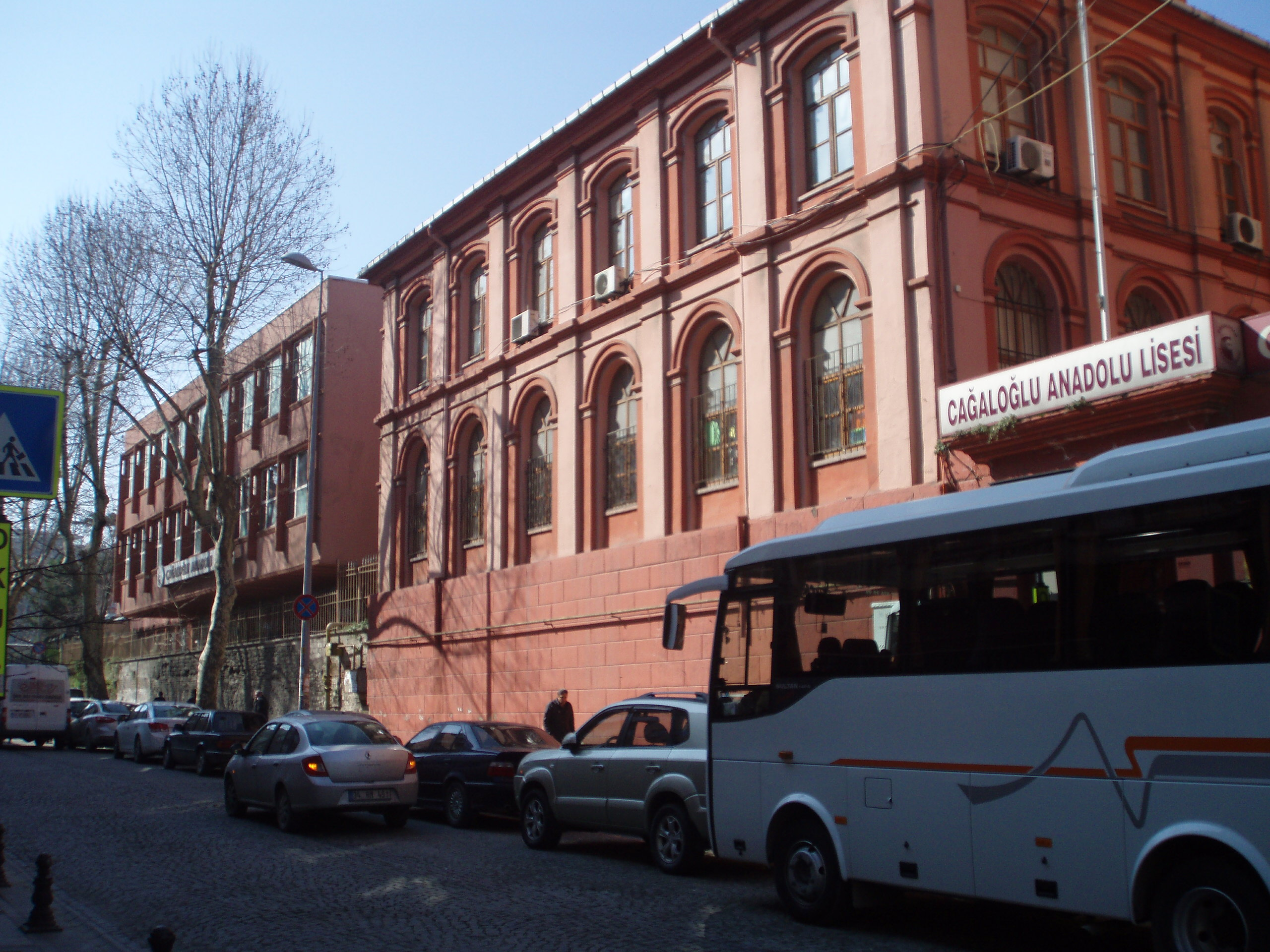
- Entrance and main building of Cağaloğlu Anadolu High School

Location
- Bab-ı Ali Cad. 13; Cağaloğlu, Fatih; Istanbul; Turkey
- 41°00′35″N 28°58′25″E

Information
- School type: Public Anadolu
- Established: 1850
- Sister school: Istanbul Boys High School
- Principal: Gökhan Karataş
- Head teacher: Osman Arslan
- Staff: 4 (August 2021)
- Teaching staff: 53 (August 2021)
- Grades: prep + 9-12
- Years offered: prep + 4
- Gender: Co-ed
- Enrollment: 909 (2021)
- Classes: 32
- Average class size: 34
- Classes offered: Prep. Class-9-10-11-12
- Colour: Grey-Red
- Slogan: Alles für CAL!
- Song: Say CAĞALOĞLU CAĞALOĞLU
- Fight song: Through Fire and Flames - Dragonforce
- Sports: Badminton, volleyball, basketball, football
- Mascot: Phoenix
- Nickname: CAL
- Rival: İstanbul Erkek Lisesi
- Website: cagalogluanadolulisesi.meb.k12.tr

Cağaloğlu Anatolian High School (Turkish: Cağaloğlu Anadolu Lisesi), in Cağaloğlu, İstanbul, is one of the oldest and internationally renowned high schools of Turkey. Istanbul Cağaloğlu Anatolian High School is considered to be an elite public high school in Turkey. The primary languages of instruction are Turkish and German. The secondary foreign language of instruction is English. Germany recognizes the school as a "Deutsche Auslandsschule" (German International school).

Education is four years after one prep year. Enrollment capacity is 150. The total number of students is 854 in 33 classes with an average class size of around 30. As of August 2021, the high school has five administrative staff and 53 teaching staff. Enrollment is for German language education, four teachers from Germany are tasked along with seven experienced Turkish teachers. Graduates obtain a diploma "Deutsches Sprachdiplom" (DSD-A2/B1 or B2/C1), which proves German language proficiency required for entry to a college or to study at a university in Germany respectively.

Prior to Cağaloglu Anatolian High School the complex in which the school functions used to host Istanbul Girls High School. They also host a Model G20 summit for high school students.

== Notable alumni ==
- Nejat İşler (born 1972), actor
- Engin Hepileri (born 1979) actor
- Dağhan Külegeç (born 1978) actor
- Algı Eke (born 1985), actress
- Sinem Öztürk (born 1985), actress
- Sinan Kaynakçı (born 1979), lead vocalist of Pinhani band

== See also ==
- Istanbul Girls High School
