= Permanent Representative of Argentina to the United Nations =

Ambassador of Argentina to United Nations
- Incumbent; María del Carmen Squeff since 2020
- Inaugural holder: José Arce
- Formation: 1946

The Permanent Representative of Argentina to the United Nations is the official representative of the government of Argentina to the United Nations.

== List of representatives ==
Permanent Representative	Diplomatic accreditation	Term end	President of Argentina	Secretary-General of the United Nations	Notes
José Arce	21 July 1946	31 December 1949	Juan Domingo Perón	Trygve Lie	He was President of the Security Council in the months of November 1948 and 1949, and President of the General Assembly in 1948.
Jerónimo Remorino	1950	1951	Juan Domingo Perón	Trygve Lie	
Rodolfo Muñoz	1951	1953	Juan Domingo Perón	Trygve Lie; Dag Hammarskjöld	Interim representative between 1951 and August 1952.
Juan Isaac Cooke	1953	1955	Juan Domingo Perón	Dag Hammarskjöld	
Aníbal Olivieri	June 1955	1956	Eduardo Lonardi; Pedro Eugenio Aramburu	Dag Hammarskjöld	
Adolfo Bioy	1955	1956	Eduardo Lonardi; Pedro Eugenio Aramburu	Dag Hammarskjöld	Representative to the General Assembly.
Mariano José Drago	1957	1958	Pedro Eugenio Aramburu	Dag Hammarskjöld	
Mario Amadeo	1958	1962	Arturo Frondizi	Dag Hammarskjöld; U Thant	He was President of the United Nations Security Council in May 1959.
Lucio García del Solar	1962	1966	José María Guido; Arturo Umberto Illia	U Thant	With the rank of chargé d'affaires.
Bonifacio del Carril	1965	1966	Arturo Umberto Illia	U Thant	Extraordinary ambassador for the treatment of resolution 2065 on the Malvinas Question.
José María Ruda	1966	1970	Arturo Umberto Illia; Juan Carlos Onganía	U Thant	
Carlos Ortiz de Rozas	1970	1977	Juan Carlos Onganía; Roberto Levingston; Alejandro Lanusse; Héctor J. Cámpora; Raúl Lastiri; Juan D. Perón; María Estela Martínez de Perón; Jorge Rafael Videla	U Thant; Kurt Waldheim	He was President of the United Nations Security Council in March 1971 and in July 1972. In 1971 France proposed him as Secretary General, obtaining 13 votes out of 15, but was blocked by the veto of the Soviet Union. He ran for office again in 1981, but this time was vetoed by the United Kingdom, France and the Soviet Union.
Enrique J. Ros	1977	1980	Jorge Rafael Videla	Kurt Waldheim	
Juan Carlos Beltramino	1980	February 1982	Jorge Rafael Videla; Roberto Eduardo Viola; Leopoldo Fortunato Galtieri	Kurt Waldheim; Javier Pérez de Cuéllar	
Eduardo A. Roca	March 1982	27 May 1982	Leopoldo Fortunato Galtieri	Javier Pérez de Cuéllar	He retired from the position due to health problems.
Arnoldo Listre	27 May 1982	1982	Leopoldo Fortunato Galtieri	Javier Pérez de Cuéllar	Interim chargé d'affaires. Deputy Permanent Representative.
Carlos Manuel Muñiz	1982	1986	Reynaldo Bignone; Raúl Alfonsín	Javier Pérez de Cuéllar	
Marcelo Delpech	1986	17 July 1989	Raúl Alfonsín	Javier Pérez de Cuéllar	He was President of the United Nations Security Council in March 1987 and June 1988.
Jorge Vázquez (diplomat)	1989	September 1992	Carlos Menem	Javier Pérez de Cuéllar; Boutros Boutros-Ghali	Resignation from office.
Alfredo Chiaradía	September 1992	January 1993	Carlos Menem	Boutros Boutros-Ghali	Interim chargé d'affaires. Deputy Permanent Representative (August 1989-January 1993).
Emilio Cárdenas	18 January 1993	1996	Carlos Menem	Boutros Boutros-Ghali	He was President of the United Nations Security Council in January 1995.
Fernando Petrella	4 September 1996	10 December 1999	Carlos Menem	Boutros Boutros-Ghali; Kofi Annan	
Arnoldo Listre	10 January 2000	2003	Fernando de la Rúa; Eduardo Duhalde; Néstor Kirchner	Kofi Annan	He was President of the United Nations Security Council in February 2000.
César Mayoral	16 January 2004	18 June 2007	Néstor Kirchner	Kofi Annan; Ban Ki-moon	He was President of the United Nations Security Council in the months January 2005 and March 2006.
Jorge Argüello	18 June 2007	1 December 2011	Néstor Kirchner Cristina Fernández de Kirchner	Ban Ki-moon	He was President of the Special Committee on Decolonization in 2008, and president of the Group of 77 + China during 2011.
Mateo Estrémé	1 December 2011	23 November 2012	Cristina Fernández de Kirchner	Ban Ki-moon	Interim chargé d'affaires
María Cristina Perceval	23 November 2012	10 December 2015	Cristina Fernández de Kirchner	Ban Ki-moon	In August 2013 she was President of the Security Council. In January 2015 she presided over the General Assembly.
Mateo Estrémé	10 December 2015	16 February 2016	Mauricio Macri	Ban Ki-moon	Interim chargé d'affaires
Martín García Moritán	16 February 2016	27 February 2020	Mauricio Macri	Ban Ki-moon; António Guterres	
María del Carmen Squeff	31 August 2020		Alberto Fernández	António Guterres	
Ricardo Ernesto Lagorio	14 March 2024		Javier Milei	António Guterres	
Francisco Fabián Tropepi	5 December 2024		Javier Milei	António Guterres	
