= Model G20 =

Educational simulation program

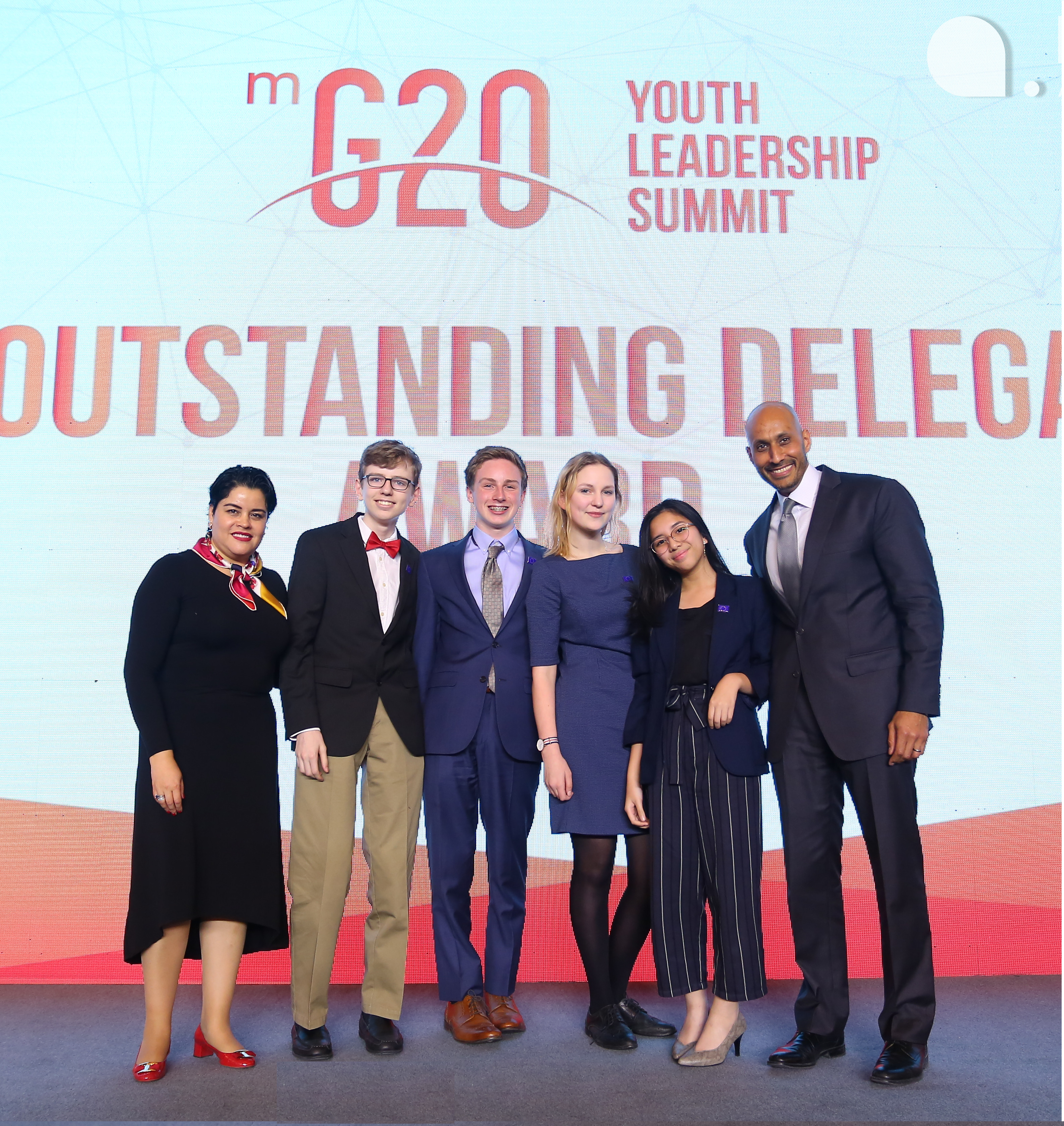
Students at an award ceremony following a Model G20 summit

A Model G20, also known as a Model G20 Summit, is an educational simulation for high school and college students. Students role play as government ministers from one of the G20 countries or their guests and negotiate solutions to defined problems. During a G20 summit, students learn about diplomacy, international relations, the G20, and other issues related to a theme of the summit. Some individual schools have Model G20 clubs for students interested in these topics.

It is similar to a Model United Nations. At the end of summits, individual delegates and entire delegations are often given awards for their performance.

== American University ==
At American University in Washington, D.C., Model G20s have been hosted by the School of International Service since 2017 for both undergraduate and graduate students. It was established by Cecilia Nahón, the former ambassador of Argentina to the United States and a participant in actual G20 summits.

== Mayo Model G20 Summit ==
The Mayo Model G20 Summit, organized by Mayo College, a prestigious boys-only private boarding school, in India, is a colossal event that brings together the brightest minds from prestigious institutions across the world to address urgent political, social, and economic issues while mastering collaborative diplomacy, innovation, and sustainable solutions. As the leaders of tomorrow, the participants engage in high-level discussions, negotiations, and problem-solving exercises that mirror the actual G20 summit. It has a different theme every year and is a first-of-its-kind event, providing a fully accurate simulation of the actual G20 Summit in the country with an idiosyncratic format that was formulated without any reference. This event is designed for future leaders who aspire to make a positive impact on the world.

== Cağaloğlu Anadolu Lisesi ==
As of 2019, Cağaloğlu Anadolu Lisesi in Istanbul, Turkey has held a Model G20 every year since 2016. The third annual Model G20 in 2018 was held at Istanbul Aydın University with students from various nations attending.

== Knovva Academy ==
The Knovva Academy Model G20 Summit has been held in cities around the world since 2016, including in Beijing, Boston, and Cambridge. The summit in Boston is held at Harvard University. At the 2019 Beijing summit, high school students from more than 20 countries attended. Delegates at Knovva Academy Model G20 summits attend several days of academic workshops and keynote speeches preparing them for the summits. They also spend time traveling in the host country.

In addition to hosting Model G20s, Knovva Academy also sends a group to the Y20 summit, the official youth portion of the G20 that takes place in advance of the meeting of heads of state. Attendance at Knovva Academy events is by invitation only, with students needing to submit academic records and complete an interview.

== See also ==
- Experiential learning
- Global civics
- Global Classrooms
- Mock trial
- Model Arab League
- Model Congress
- Moot court
