= Martín García Mérou =

Argentine poet and diplomat (1862–1905)

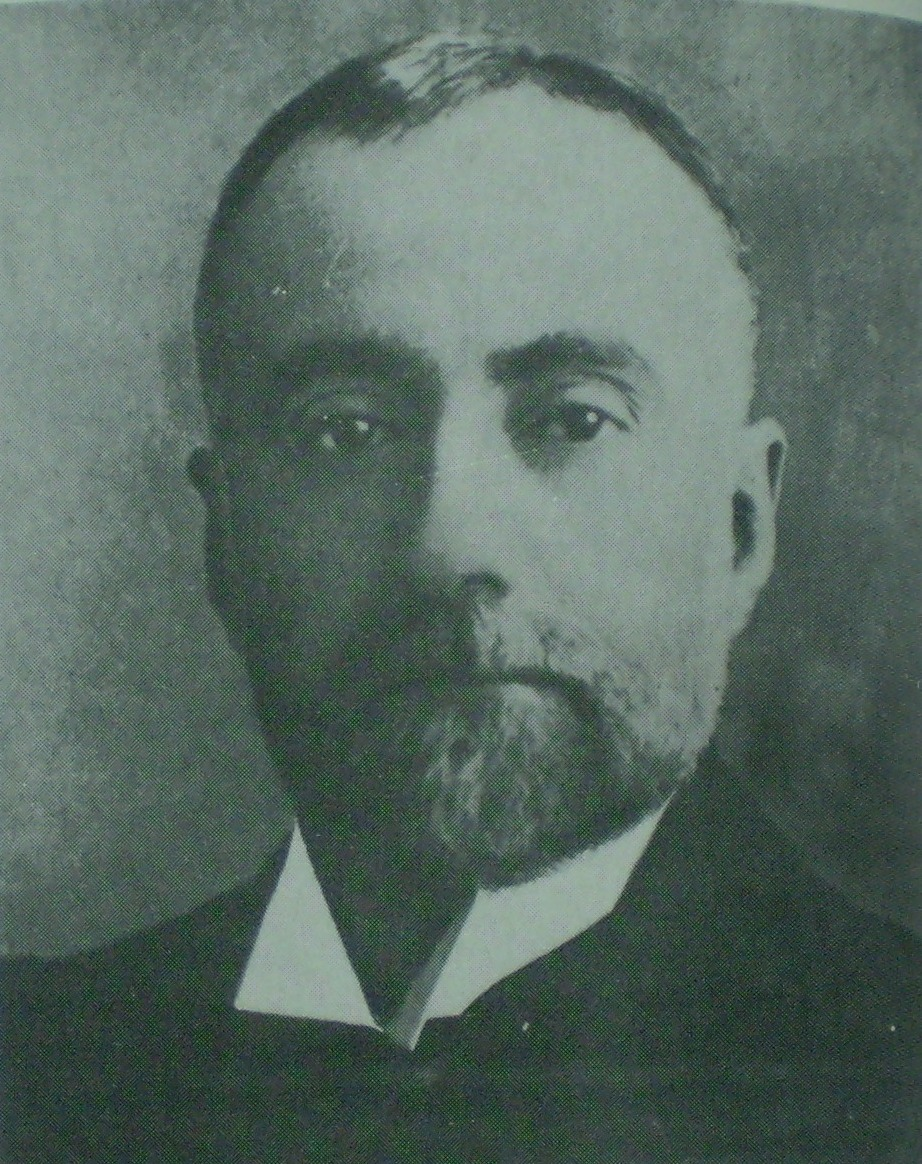

Minister of Agriculture of Argentina
- In office January 11, 1900 – March 21, 1901
- President: Julio Argentino Roca
- Preceded by: Emilio Civit
- Succeeded by: Ezequiel Ramos Mexía

Personal details
- Born: October 14, 1862 Buenos Aires, Argentina
- Died: May 30, 1905 (aged 42) Berlin, Germany
- Political party: National Autonomist Party
- Spouse: Delia Herrera
- Education: Colegio Nacional de Buenos Aires
- Occupation: Poet, diplomat

Martín García Mérou (Buenos Aires, October 14, 1862 — Berlin, May 30, 1905) was an Argentine poet, novelist and essayist, as well as a diplomat and politician, serving as Minister of Agriculture from 1900 to 1901.

His written works include Estudios literarios (1884), Libros y autores (1886), Juan Bautista Alberdi (1890), Recuerdos literarios (1891), Confidencias literarias (1894), Ensayo sobre Echeverría (1894) and El Brasil Intelectual: impresiones y notas literarias (1900). He died in Berlin at the age of 43.

== Biography ==
Son of the Spaniard Antonio García and the Frenchwoman Olimpia Mérou, he spent his childhood in the province of Entre Ríos, and attended secondary school at the National School of Buenos Aires. There he began his literary career, winning a competition for a composition and beginning to publish serials in the newspaper La Nación.

He began studying law at the University of Buenos Aires, but preferred to dedicate his time to literature, publishing successive volumes of poetry. He belonged to the Scientific and Literary Circle and published in the newspaper Álbum el Hogar, edited by the poet Gervasio Méndez.

At the age of nineteen he accompanied Miguel Cané as a legation officer in the Argentine embassy in Colombia, and shortly after in Venezuela, where he was also interim chargé d'affaires. In 1883 he was secretary of the embassy in Brazil and the following year in Spain. He made a long trip to Paris, from where he accompanied Nicolás Avellaneda on the return trip to his country, during which the former president's death occurred.

In 1885 he was private secretary to President Julio Argentino Roca, who the following year appointed him ambassador to Paraguay. He presided over the funeral of Domingo Faustino Sarmiento, who died in Asunción. He was successively ambassador to Peru, Brazil and the United States.

During his long diplomatic career he maintained correspondence with the newspaper La Nación, which published his articles, and with its director, Bartolomé Mitre. He was a firm admirer of the United States and a fervent believer in the benefits of Pan-Americanism, and he actively collaborated in establishing cordial relations between his country and the North American power, which had gone through a period of strong rivalry.

In 1901, President Roca appointed him Minister of Agriculture, although he did not have any relevant performance, since he immediately led his country's delegation to the Pan-American Conference in Mexico, where he proposed establishing as a mandatory standard for all differences between countries arbitration by governments of third countries; He was strongly opposed by the American delegate. For this reason, he requested and obtained from the president the reinstatement of him as ambassador in that country, to continue his campaign in favor of the arbitration position.

In 1905 he was appointed ambassador to the German Empire, with the position of plenipotentiary minister to Russia and the Austro-Hungarian Empire. He died a few days after his arrival in Berlin, in May of that year.

== Selected works ==
Poetry

- Poesías (1878–1880)
- Nuevas Poesías (1880–1881)
- Varias Poesías
- Lavinia (poemita)
- Poesías (1880–1885)

Critiques

- Estudios literarios (1884)
- Libros y autores (1886)
- Juan Bautista Alberdi (1890)
- Cuadros épicos (1890)
- Recuerdos literarios (1890)
- Mis huacos (1893)
- Ensayo sobre Echeverría (1894)
- Historia de la República Argentina (1899)
- El Brasil intelectual (1900)
- Estudios americanos (1900, republished 1915)
- Historia de la diplomacia americana (1904)
- Apuntes económicos e industriales sobre los Estados Unidos (1905)
