= Istanbul Girls High School =

Old high school in Istanbul

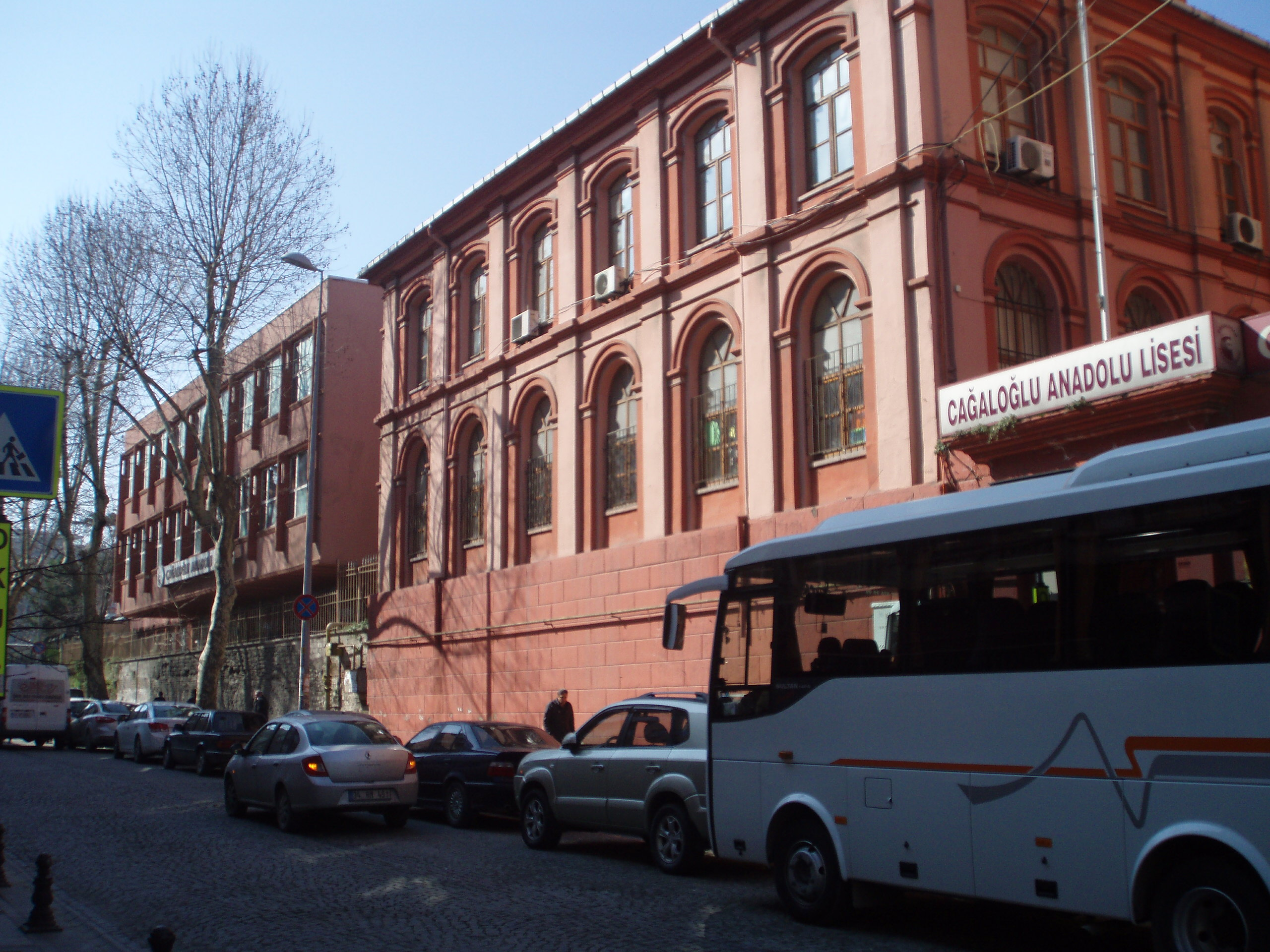
Istanbul Girls' High School, today Cağaloğlu Anadolu Lisesi.

Istanbul Girls' High School (Turkish: İstanbul Kız Lisesi: 1850-1988) was the first state established girls' school in the Ottoman Empire.

The school was inaugurated on March 21, 1850 (175 years ago), by Sadrazam Mustafa Reshid Pasha, one of the architects of the Tanzimat reforms, in a building donated by Bezmiâlem Sultan, mother of Sultan Abdulmejid I. At the beginning, it was a secondary school (Turkish: rüşdiye).

During most of the republican period in Turkey, the school was known under the name İstanbul Kız Lisesi, but always related to its founding mother Bezm-i Alem, whose name it carried officially as Bezm-i Alem Sultanisi for about a decade until 1924, when it was renamed.

The school could not be spared from a spree of closing (or turning into a mixed gender school), similar to what other girls-only schools also experienced in Turkey in the early 1980s. It ceased receiving new students in 1984, had its final graduates in 1988 (38 years ago), and then closed down. At its closure, its building became Cağaloğlu Anatolian High School.

== See also ==
- Education in the Ottoman Empire
- Cağaloğlu Anadolu Lisesi
