= Jorge Argüello =

Argentine politician and diplomat

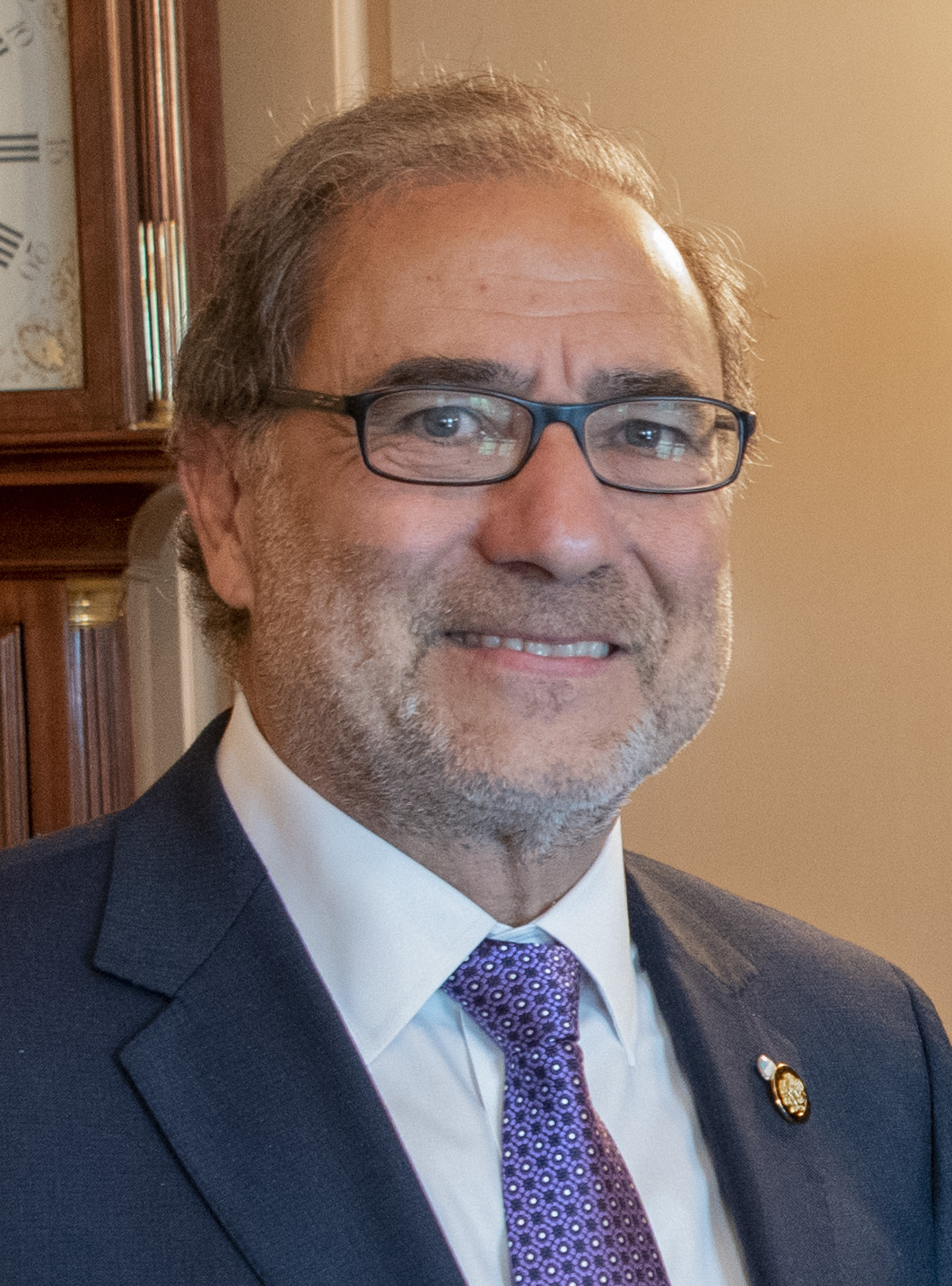

Argentine Ambassador to the United States
- In office 10 December 2019 – 10 December 2023
- Preceded by: Fernando Oris de Roa
- In office 1 December 2011 – 8 January 2013
- Preceded by: Alfredo Chiaradía
- Succeeded by: Cecilia Nahón

Permanent Representative of Argentina to the United Nations
- In office 18 June 2007 – 1 December 2011
- Preceded by: César Mayoral
- Succeeded by: María Perceval

National Deputy
- In office 10 December 2003 – 4 May 2007
- Constituency: City of Buenos Aires
- In office 10 December 1991 – 10 December 1995
- Constituency: City of Buenos Aires

Legislator of the City of Buenos Aires
- In office 4 December 1997 – 10 December 2003

Personal details
- Born: 20 April 1956 (age 70) Córdoba, Córdoba Province, Argentina
- Party: Justicialist Party
- Other political affiliations: Frente de Todos (2019–present); Citizen's Unity (2017–2019); Front for Victory (2003–2017)
- Spouse: Erika Grinberg
- Education: University of Buenos Aires; University of San Andrés

Jorge Martín Arturo Argüello (born April 20, 1956) is an Argentine politician and diplomat. Argüello served as Permanent Representative of Argentina to the United Nations between 2007 and 2011. Argüello was also designated Ambassador of Argentina to the United States during two separate terms, from 2011 to 2013 and again from 2019 to 2023. In 2013 was appointed Ambassador of Argentina to Portugal.

== Life and public service ==
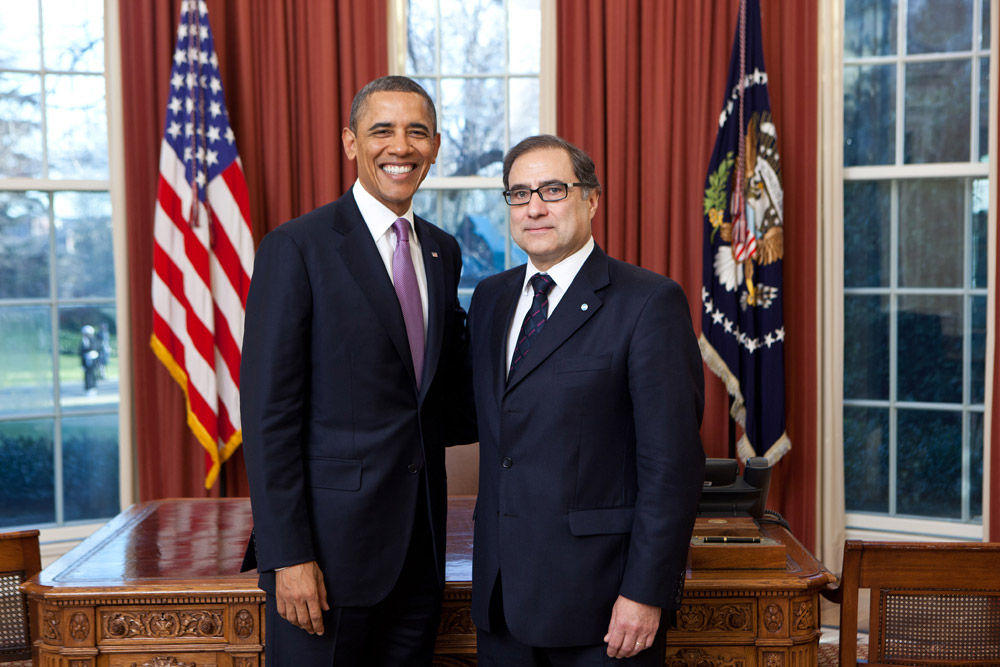
Argüello with U.S. President Barack Obama

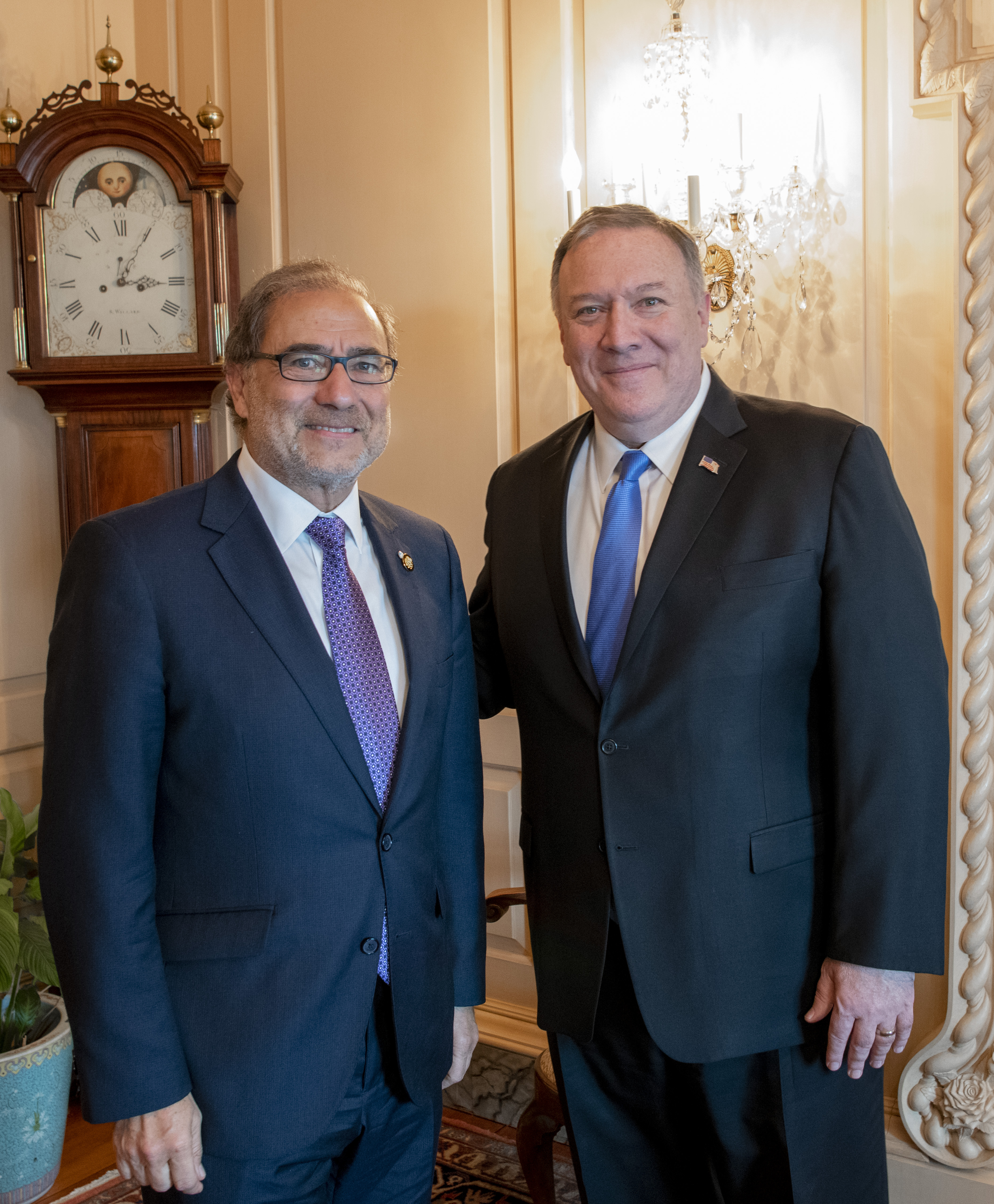
Argüello with U.S. Secretary of State Mike Pompeo

Argüello was born in Córdoba in 1956 as the first of four children by Jorge Marcelo Argüello Varela and Raquel Luque Colombres. He graduated from Rochester Community High School, Rochester, Indiana, in 1974, and returned to Argentina, where he enrolled at the University of Buenos Aires and earned a law degree in 1985. He later earned a master's degree in Administration and Public Affairs at the University of San Andrés (Argentina), and authored numerous articles and books on democratic participation. Argüello is married to journalist Erika Grinberg, and has a son and three daughters.

He entered public service upon his election in 1987 to the Buenos Aires City Council, and served in the Argentine Chamber of Deputies between 1991 and 1995. Argüello served as host organizer in 1994 of the first official visit to Argentina of a British Parliamentary delegation since the Falklands War twelve years earlier, and later represented Latin America countries in the 1994-95 meeting of the Parliamentarians for Global Action. In 1996, he was elected in the convention of Buenos Aires City (Convención Constituyente) called in 1996 to write the Constitution of the City of Buenos Aires. Between 1997 and 2003 he served as deputy of the newly established Buenos Aires City Legislature in two successive periods (1997–2000 and 2000–2003).

In 2003, Argüello was again elected to the Chamber of Deputies and he became Chairman of the Foreign Relations Committee, and in that capacity organized the office of the Parliamentary Monitor for the Falkland Islands (Observatorio Parliamentario Cuestión Islas Malvinas). In 2007, he was appointed by President Nestor Kirchner as Permanent Representative of Argentina to the United Nations. In that capacity Argüello served as Vice President of the Peace and Security Committee of Inter-Parliamentary Union in 2006 and 2007. He was Chairman of the UN Special Committee on Decolonization in 2008, and president of the Group of 77 and China for their 2011 session. In November 2011, Arguello was designated as Ambassador of Argentina to the United States, and his credentials were formally accepted on 1 December.

In March 2013, was designated as Ambassador of Argentina to Portugal.

== International work ==
• Inter-Parliamentary Union (IPU): Vice-President of the First Standing Committee on Peace and International Security Inter-Parliamentary Union (2006–2007)

• Member of the Commission negotiating the External Debt of the Autonomous City of Buenos Aires (London, 2003)

• Organizer of the first visit after the British Parliamentary conflict Falkland Islands (1994)

• President of "Parliamentarians for Global Action" on behalf of the Latin American countries(1994–95)

• Chairman of the Twinning Buenos Aires - Tel Aviv (Sister Cities, 1989)

• Honors and awards received various international

== Academic work ==
• Georgetown University (USA): Member of the Class Advisory Board School of Foreign Service.

• University of Belgrano (Argentina). Member of the Academic Council of the School of Government. Professor of the Chair of the Parliamentary Operation School of Public Officers. Professor of the Chair of Technical Trading Course in Political Science from the Faculty of Law and Social Sciences. 1998 - 2003.

• Author of several opinion articles published in national and international media, author, co-author and compiler of books on political participation and citizenship.

== Falkland Islands (Islas Malvinas) sovereignty dispute ==
Argüello has dictated conferences to advance Argentine claims in the Falkland Islands sovereignty dispute on several universities.

• Universita di Bologna, Facolta di Scienze, Bologna, Italy

• Chinese Academy of Social Sciences. Beijing, China.

• Foundation for International Studies of China, Beijing, China.

• Universita Dell'Insubria, Varese, Italy;

• National Autonomous University of Mexico (USE), Mexico;

• Cape Town University, Cape Town, South Africa;

• Academic Centre ADEN Business School, Panama;

• Chulalongkorn University, Bangkok, Thailand• Jawalharial Nehru University (JNU), New Delhi, India

• Institute of International Relations "Raúl Roa García", La Habana, Cuba:

• Columbia University, New York, USA;

• University of California, Los Angeles, USA;

• New School University, New York, USA;

• University of Chicago, Illinois, USA
