= Bonifacio del Carril =

Argentine writer, lawyer, diplomat and historian

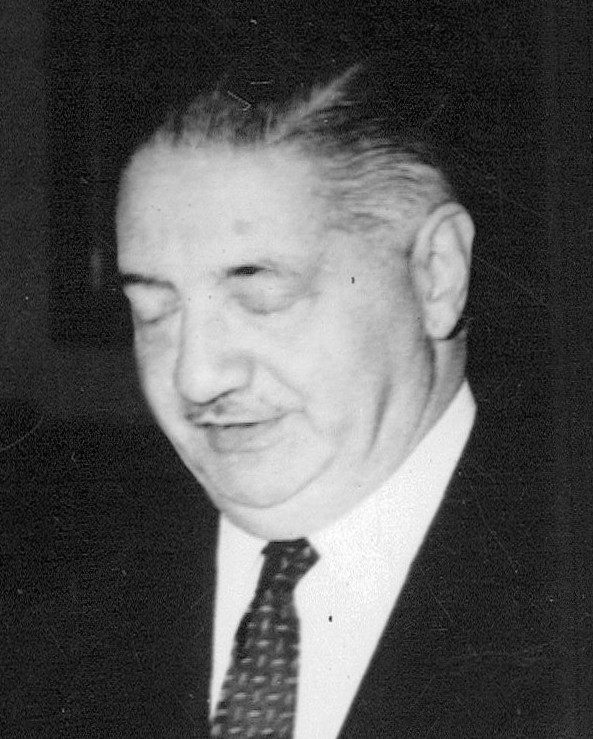
A portrait of Bonifacio del Carril

Bonifacio del Carril (14 April 1911 – 23 December 1994) was an Argentine writer, lawyer, diplomat, and historian.

== Life ==
After receiving his Doctor of Laws degree from the University of Buenos Aires, he held a number of political positions in Argentina, including Undersecretary of the Interior in 1944, Foreign Minister in 1962, and Special Ambassador to the United Nations in 1965.

He wrote for La Nación for forty years and published over three hundred articles and sixty books, and pamphlets on politics, history, and art. His work discussed many political and cultural topics, such as ballottage, open primary elections, and presidential term limits.

He is known for his translations into Spanish of Antoine de Saint-Exupéry's The Little Prince and Albert Camus' The Stranger.

== Publications ==
- (in Spanish) Gericault, Las Litoras Argentinas, Emece Editores, 1989 ISBN 9789500409100
