= María Perceval =

Argentine politician

María Cristina Perceval
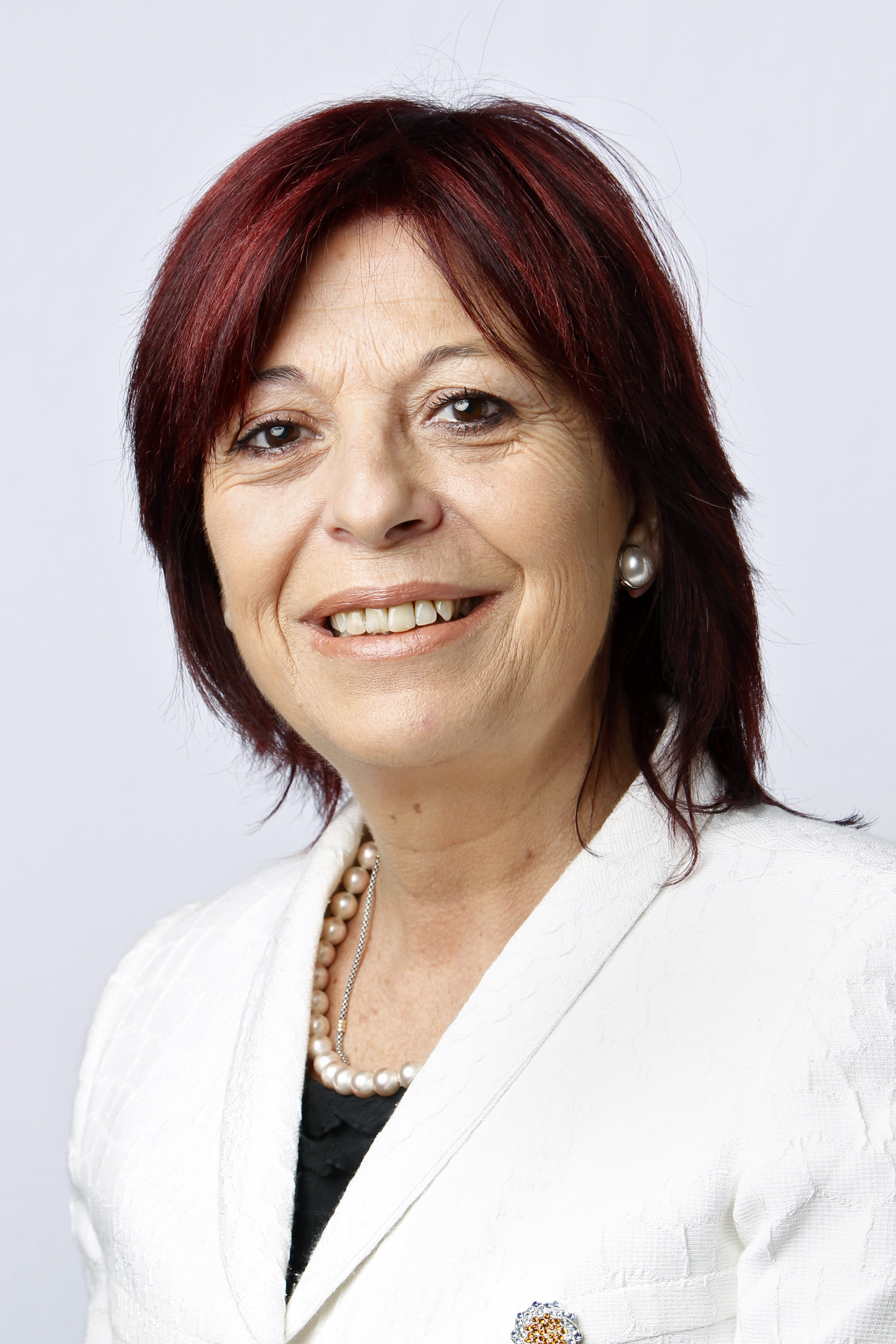
- Argentine politician

Permanent Representative of Argentina to the United Nations
- In office 23 November 2012 – 16 February 2016
- Preceded by: Jorge Argüello
- Succeeded by: Martín García Moritán

National senator
- In office 10 December 2001 – 10 December 2009
- Succeeded by: Laura Montero
- Constituency: Mendoza

Personal details
- Born: 10 September 1956 (age 69); Mendoza, Argentina
- Political party: Justicialist Party; Front for Victory
- Spouse: Pablo Martín
- Profession: Professor of philosophy and epistemology

María Cristina "Marita" Perceval (born 10 September 1956) is an Argentine politician and member of the Justicialist Party. She was the permanent representative of Argentina to the United Nations from September 2012 to February 2016, and was a national senator for Mendoza Province from 2001 to 2009.

== Biography ==
Perceval was born in Mendoza, Argentina, to Julio Perceval, a musician and founder of the music department of the National University of Cuyo (UNCuyo), and Alejandrina Suárez, the first female organist in Argentina. She graduated with a degree in philosophy with a special focus on gender studies, epistemology and human rights from the UNCuyo (1980).

Perceval began a career in academia as a university professor and in public administration, co-ordinating projects for the provincial governments of Mendoza and Buenos Aires Provinces as well as the Argentine Chamber of Deputies. She was the project director of research on epistemology, gender studies and human rights at UNCuyo from 1988 to 1992, assistant professor of the history of sciences, philosophy and metaphysics at her alma mater between 1990 and 2001, and professor of advanced epistemology at UNCuyo between 1998 and 2001. She founded and was director of the Institute of Social Management at the University of Aconcagua and was president of the Institute for Women in Mendoza from 1993 to 1995.

Perceval is married and has three children. She has written numerous articles and studies on children's rights and women's rights.

Perceval followed her early political mentor, José Bordón, and other left-wing Peronists into the FrePaSo coalition before the 1995 general election, but later returned to the Justicialist Party. She was elected to the Senate for Mendoza Province in 2001 and re-elected in 2003, later joining the majority Front for Victory parliamentary caucus. She pursued a greater role for women in Senate committees historically chaired and dominated by men, and in 2007 become chairwoman of the Defense Committee; in that capacity she became known for an unsuccessful effort in 2008 to rescind military courts martial in favor of civil trials, as she believed that courts martial deprive servicemen and women of due process. She also focused on the strengthening of democracy and democratic institutions, as well as promoting civil, political, social, cultural and economic human rights. Some of the most notable bills she wrote include Regulación de la Tenencia de Armas (Regulations on Gun Possession) in 2002 and Plan de Desarme (Action Plan on Disarmament for light weapons) in 2006. She also wrote bills against violence against women, among them Prevention and Punishment of Human Trafficking (2008) and Prevention and Punishment of Violence Against Women (2009).

While a senator, she stood as César Biffi's running mate in his unsuccessful 2007 campaign for governor of Mendoza, a ticket endorsed by the outgoing governor and vice-presidential candidate Julio Cobos. A close ally of President Cristina Fernández de Kirchner, Perceval was named under-secretary for institutional reform and strengthening of democracy for the Cabinet Chief of Argentina on the end of her term in the Senate in 2009, and in 2010 was named under-secretary for human rights at the Ministry of Justice and Human Rights. Her tenure focused mainly on the promotion and the advancement of human rights for vulnerable communities such as Afro-Argentines, the LGBT community and migrants. She also worked to advance women and children’s rights and the struggle against human trafficking within the national agenda.

=== Tenure at United Nations ===
Following the appointment of UN Representative Jorge Argüello as Ambassador to the United States, Perceval was selected to succeed him in the post in September 2012 (replacing the acting UN Representative, chargé d'affaires Mateo Estreme). Her appointment as Ambassador to the United Nations was approved unanimously by Congress, and she presented her credentials before the UN Secretary-General, Ban Ki-moon, on November 23, 2012. Perceval’s mandate as the head of the Argentine Mission is focused mainly on multilateralism and the peaceful settlement of international disputes.

Perceval's appointment coincided with Argentina's election as a non-permanent member of the Security Council for the 2013-2014 term, and was followed by the election of Argentina in August 2013 to preside in the Security Council.

Perceval is a supporter of the Campaign for the Establishment of a United Nations Parliamentary Assembly, an organisation which campaigns for democratic reform in the United Nations, and the creation of a more accountable international political system.
