= César Mayoral =

Argentinian diplomat

César Fernando Mayoral (born 21 December 1947) is an Argentinian diplomat. He served as the Permanent Representative of Argentina to the United Nations from January 2004 to June 2007.

== Biography ==
César Mayoral obtained a law degree at the Universidad de Buenos Aires (1971) and a doctorate in international relations at the University del Salvador (1978). From 1973 to 1977, he was foreign relations advisor to the Argentinian Senate, and was practicing law with his firm Silvestre, Mayoral and Associates. From 1976 to 1989, he was a professor in economics and foreign relations.

In 1989, he was a delegate to the Human Rights Commission and at the Argentine Mission to the United Nations and International Organizations in Geneva, Switzerland. In 1996, he was the Consul General of Argentine to France.

Between 2000 and 2003, César Mayoral was the Ambassador of Argentina to Canada.

In January 2004, César Mayoral presented his credentials to the United Nations Secretary-General and became the Permanent Representative of Argentina to the United Nations.

Im May 2005, César Mayoral was appointed Ambassador of Argentina to China. In January 2011, he was revoked from that position for lack of actions and results.

== Related pages ==
- List of ambassadors of Argentina to China
