= General Lucio V. Mansilla (town) =

Coordinates: 26°39′18″S 58°37′51″W

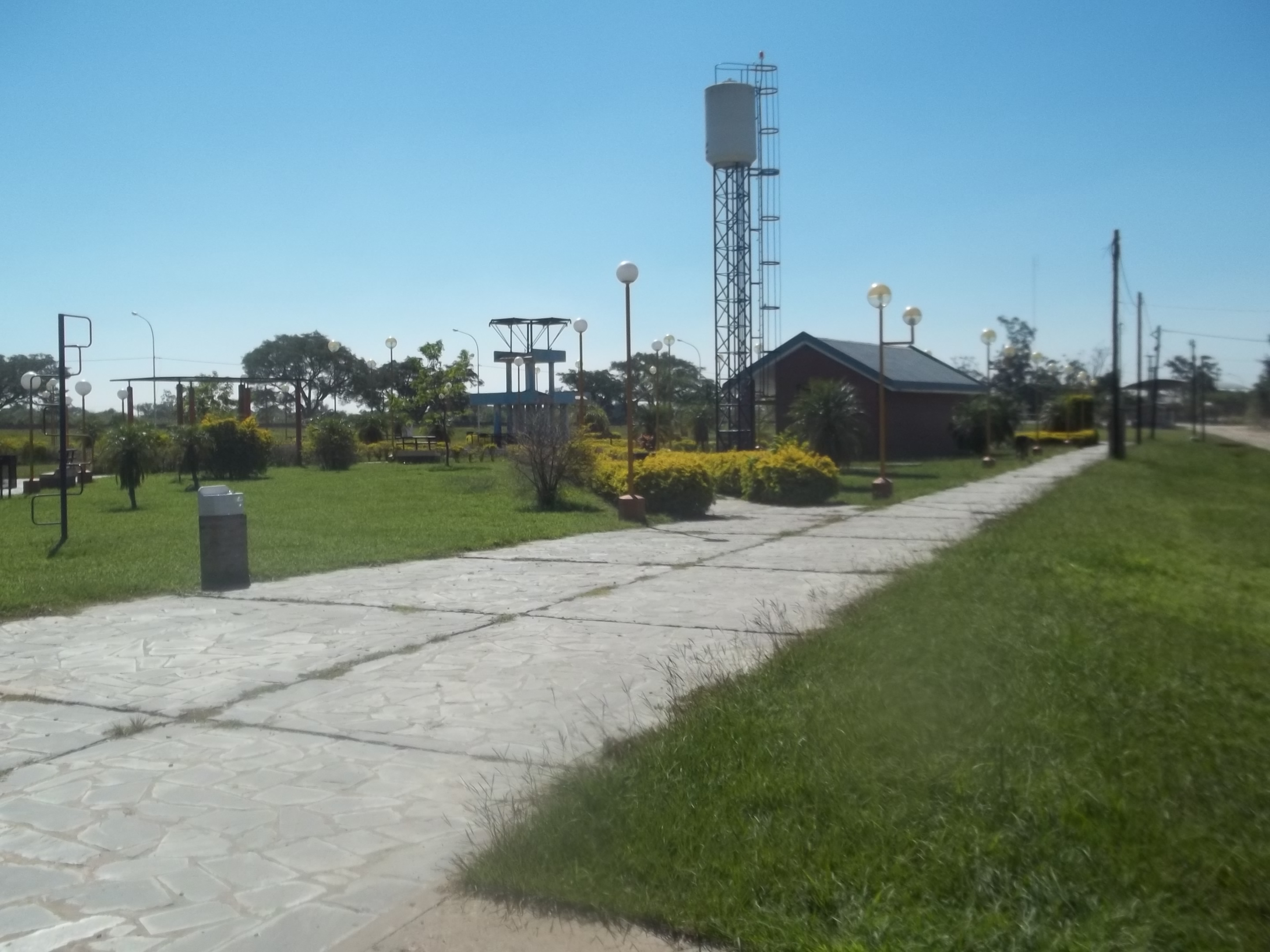
- Interactive map of General Lucio V. Mansilla
- Country: Argentina
- Province: Formosa Province
- Time zone: UTC−3 (ART)
- Climate: Cfa

General Lucio V. Mansilla is a settlement in northern Argentina. It is located in Formosa Province. It is named after the General Lucio V. Mansilla.
