= Carlos Manuel Muñiz =

Argentine politician

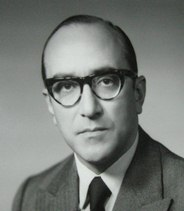
Carlos Manuel Muñiz

Carlos Manuel Muñiz (2 February 1922 – 31 October 2007) was an Argentine politician and diplomat. He served as Minister of Foreign Affairs of Argentina between 1962 and 1963 during the presidency of José María Guido.

He also served as Argentine ambassador to the United States, to Bolivia and the United Nations. He was the creator of the National Foreign Service Institute of Argentina in 1963, whose function is to recruit Argentine diplomats.

He was born in Buenos Aires and studied law at National University of La Plata.
