= Eduardo A. Roca =

Argentine diplomat (1921–2019)

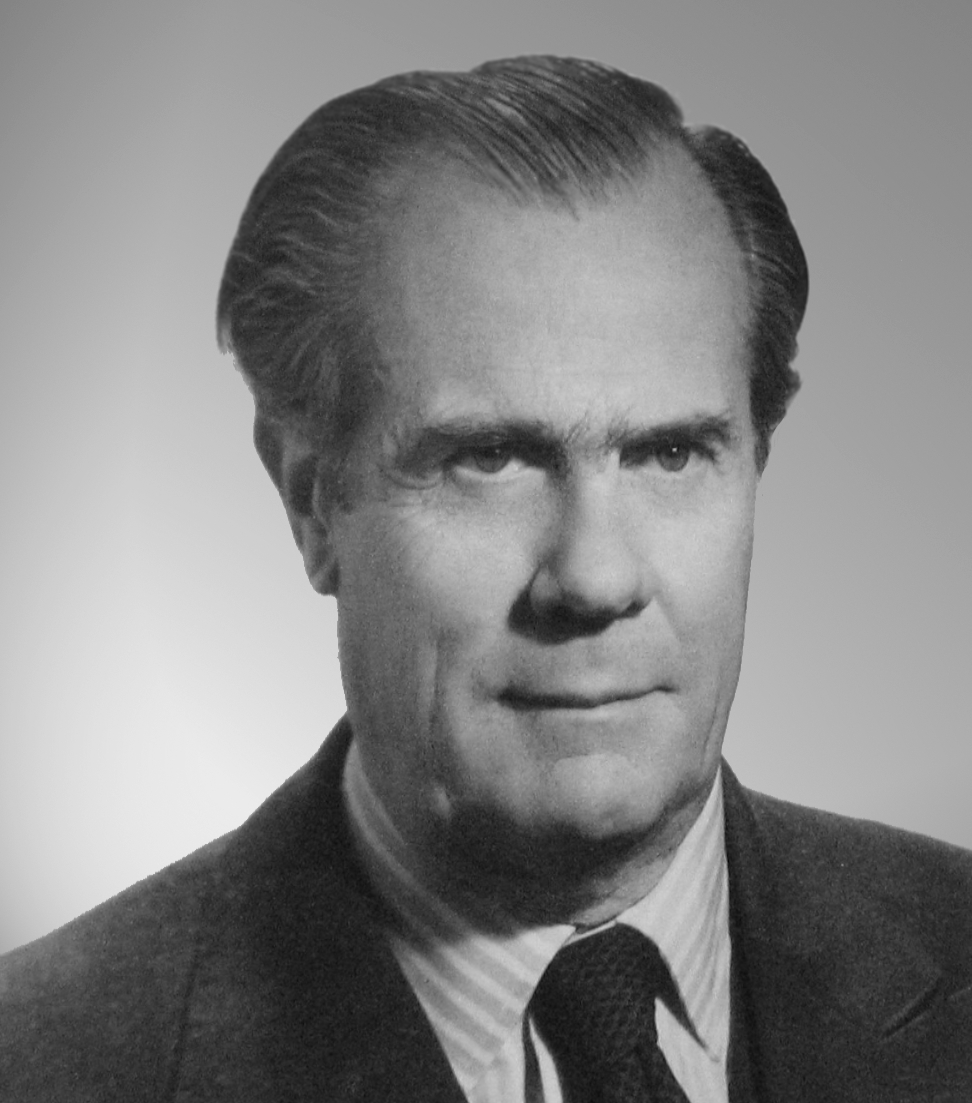
- Eduardo A. Roca (ca 1982)
- Born: 15 December 1921; Buenos Aires, Argentina
- Died: 15 May 2019 (aged 97); Buenos Aires, Argentina

Eduardo Alejandro Roca (15 December 1921 – 15 May 2019) was an Argentine lawyer, academic, and diplomat. He was Ambassador of Argentina to the United States (1968–1970) and was appointed as a permanent representative to the United Nations during the 1982 Falklands War.

== Early life and family ==
Eduardo Alejandro Roca was born on 15 December 1921 in Buenos Aires to Marco Roca and Maria Teresa Hunter. He was the grand-nephew of Julio Argentino Roca, the eighth President of Argentina.

== Career ==
In 1944, Roca worked as a lawyer at the Faculty of Law and Social Sciences of the University of Buenos Aires (UBA).

Among his public functions, he served as Undersecretary of Justice of the Nation (1962–1963) and Director of the Central Bank of the Argentine Republic (1970–1971).

In 1966, Roca was appointed ambassador to the Organization of American States and in 1968 as ambassador to the United States. In February and March 1967, the Second Extraordinary Inter-American Conference of the OAS was held in Buenos Aires. There, the de facto government of Juan Carlos Onganía proposed the creation within the American organization of a Defense Advisory Committee. The bill established that the committee would advise on problems of military collaboration and would act "as a preparation body for self-defense against aggression". In one of his exhibitions previous to March of that year (1967), Ambassador Roca commented that the problems of security and defense "are, by nature, key strategic problems to solve in peace all others that interest the American continent." In a speech in March 1968, Roca spoke of "subversive activity," instead of possible external enemies. At the time of the vote, the draft submitted by Argentina had six votes in favor, eleven against, and three abstentions.

Roca was a member of the Board of Directors of the Faculty of Law of the University of Buenos Aires and of the Superior Council of the Faculty of Law of the same house of studies between 1960 and 1964. He was also a professor in the Faculty of Law of the Argentine Catholic University and co-founder of the Argentine Council for International Relations (CARI).

=== United Nations ===
Roca was appointed as a permanent representative to the United Nations during the first semester of 1982. He was appointed to the position by his friend, the then Foreign Minister Nicanor Costa Méndez. He took office a few days before the start of the Falklands War.

On 1 April 1982, Session 2345.ª was held at the Security Council in response to the suspicion of an Argentine military intervention in the Falklands/Malvinas Islands. The president of the Council, Gérard Kamanda wa Kamanda (from Zaire), invited Roca to participate. There he denounced what he believed to be an aggression on the part of the British, citing the incident that occurred in South Georgia (or San Pedro Island) the previous month. He claimed the Argentine sovereignty of those islands and denounced the obstructionist attitude of the United Kingdom for the diplomatic resolution of the sovereignty of the South Atlantic islands.

The next day, following the success of Operation Rosario (which started the war), Roca was again invited to the session by the president of the Council. There he accused the United Kingdom of evading the question of the sovereignty of the islands, as well as the decision of the Argentine government to not accept the facts formulated by the British representative during this session and the previous one and undertaking the "recovery" of the disputed islands in the Southern Atlantic.

He accused the United Kingdom of aggression and was quoted as saying: "What I must inform the Council is that today the Argentine Government has declared the recovery of their national sovereignty of the territories of the Falklands/Malvinas Islands, South Georgia and South Sandwich, in an act that responds to a just Argentine demand and also in response to legitimate defense against the recent acts of aggression provoked by the United Kingdom".

As the conflict developed, then Secretary General of the United Nations Javier Pérez de Cuéllar summoned Roca together with British Ambassador Anthony Parsons to try to mediate. On 5 May 1982, Roca condemned the United States for its support of the United Kingdom and accepted the intervention of the UN as mediator. On the other hand, he obtained a statement from the coordination bureau of the Non-Aligned Movement in favor of the Argentine claim.

== Personal life ==
Roca married Magdalena Figueroa in 1947; the couple had three sons and three daughters.

Roca died in Buenos Aires on 15 May 2019, aged 97.

== Bibliography ==
- Lanús, Juan Archibaldo (1984). De Chapultepec al Beagle. Política Exterior Argentina 1945–1980. Buenos Aires: Emecé. ISBN 950-04-0339-0.
- Rapoport, Mario (1997). El laberinto argentino: política internacional en un mundo conflictivo. EUDEBA, 1997. ISBN 9789502306643.
- Argentine, Republic Chancellor (1982). Boletín oficial de la República Argentina. Cancillería Argentina, 1982.
- Cisneros, Andrés; Corigliano, Francisco; Escudè, Carlos; Corbacho, Alejandro (2000). Las relaciones políticas, 1966–1989. Nuevohacer, Grupo Ed. Latinoamericano, 2000. ISBN 9789506946128.
