= Enrique J.A. Candioti =

Argentine diplomat

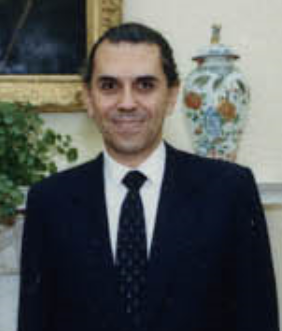
Enrique J.A. Candioti

Enrique José Alejandro Candioti (born 23 May 1936 in Santa Fe, Argentina) is an Argentine diplomat and lawyer. He received his law degree from the University of Buenos Aires. He is a former member (1997–2016) and chairman of the International Law Commission and former Secretary of State for Foreign Affairs and Legal Adviser of the Argentine Foreign Ministry. He also served as ambassador to the German Democratic Republic (1983–1985), the United States (1986–1989), Australia (1992–1997), and Germany (2001–2006). He specializes in public international law, the law of the sea, territorial and boundary disputes, and international arbitration.
