= Alfredo Chiaradía =

Argentine academic and policy maker

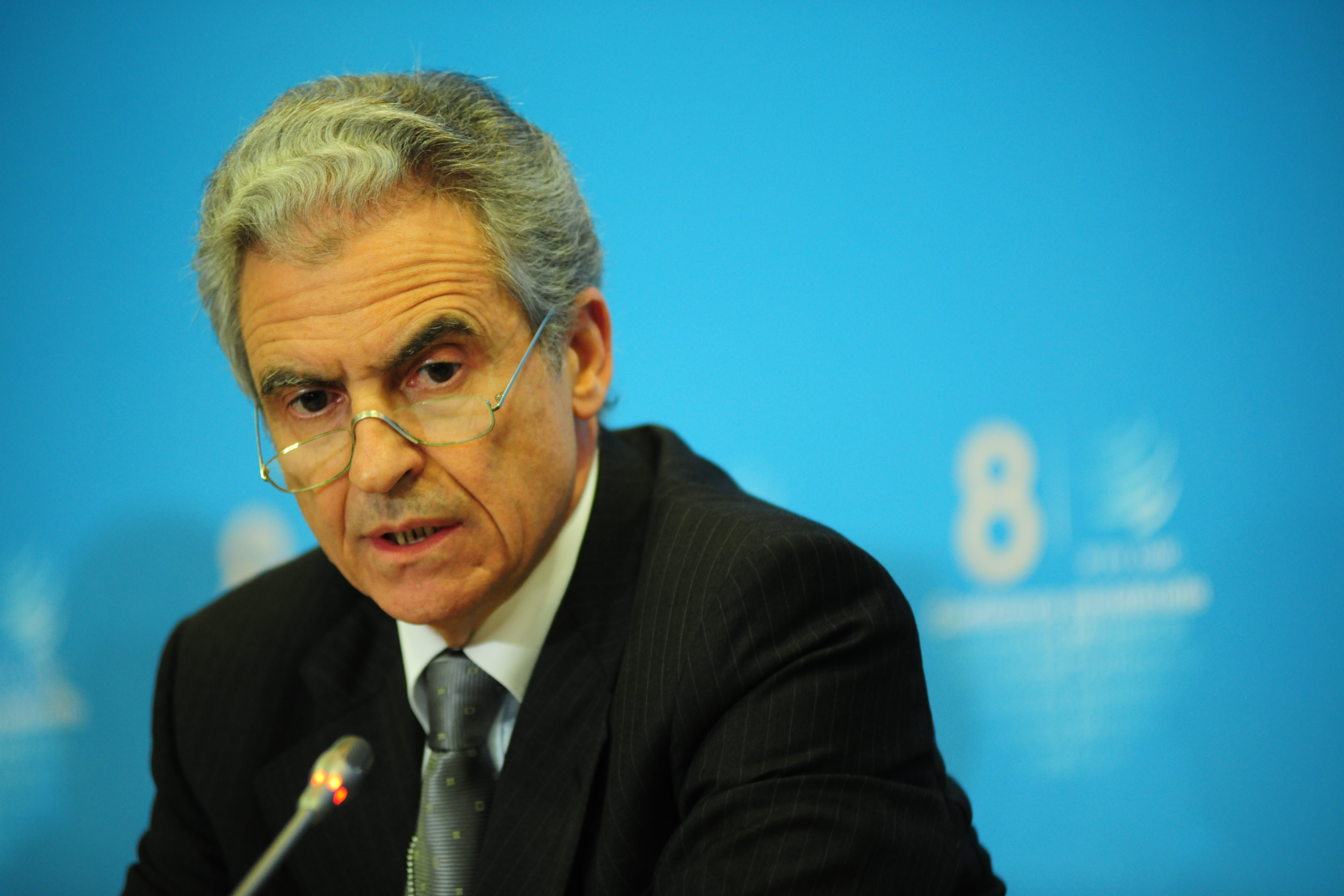

Argentine Ambassador to the United States
- In office December 10, 2010 – December 1, 2011
- President: Cristina Fernández de Kirchner
- Preceded by: Héctor Timerman
- Succeeded by: Jorge Argüello

Personal details
- Born: February 15, 1945 (age 81) Bahía Blanca, Buenos Aires Province, Argentina
- Education: University of Buenos Aires

Alfredo Vicente Chiaradía (born February 15, 1945) is an Argentine academic and policy maker. He served as his country's Ambassador to the United States in 2010 and 2011.

== Life and times ==
Alfredo Chiaradía was born in Bahía Blanca in 1945. He enrolled at the University of Buenos Aires, earning a Master's degree in Political Economy in 1968, received training at the Argentine Foreign Service Institute, and taught Economic theory at the Argentine Business University from 1970 to 1973.

Chiaradía served in numerous posts in the Ministry of Foreign Affairs in subsequent years, as well as in Argentine Embassies in Canada, Germany, and the United States. He returned to Buenos Aires in 1987 to accept an appointment as Chief of Cabinet to the Secretary of International Economic Relations, Carlos Bruno, and from 1988, served in the same capacity for the Foreign Minister, Dante Caputo.

He was named Deputy Permanent Representative to the United Nations a year later by President Raúl Alfonsín's successor, Carlos Menem. Chiaradía was transferred to the Argentine Consulate in Frankfurt in 1993, and as Consul, directed the Center for Argentine Promotion. He was named Undersecretary for International Economic Negotiations, a key post in foreign debt negotiations, in 1994, and from 1996 to 1999, served as Undersecretary for Latin American Affairs for Foreign Minister Guido di Tella. A career diplomat, Chiaradía served in a number of related posts for each of Argentina's short-lived governments in office over the next four years. He was the Ambassador to Japan until 2001, and Argentina's chief Trade Representative until August 2002, when he was named his nation's Representative to the World Trade Organization. President Néstor Kirchner appointed Chiaradía Secretary of Trade and International Economic Relations, succeeding Martín Redrado upon the latter's appointment to the Central Bank.

Chiaradía received numerous national honors during his tenure in the foreign service, including orders of national merit from Chile, France, and Italy, as well as the Order of Rio Branco (Brazil), the Order of the Rising Sun, the Order of the Aztec Eagle, and the Order of Francisco de Miranda, among others.

He was instrumental in controversial trade negotiations with China and Venezuela, and helped deflect accusations of patronage related to export licences granted by his bureau for trade with the latter country. The acrimonious, June 2010 departure of Foreign Secretary Jorge Taiana prompted Chiaradía to resign, though he was reportedly persuaded against leaving his post by Taiana's successor, Héctor Timerman; this development, as well as the support enjoyed by Chiaradía's deputy at the trade bureau, Luis Kreckler, from Planning Minister Julio de Vido, led to Kreckler's appointment as Secretary of Trade, and to Chiaradía's succeeding Timerman as Argentine Ambassador to the United States.
