= Héctor Timerman =

Argentine journalist and politician

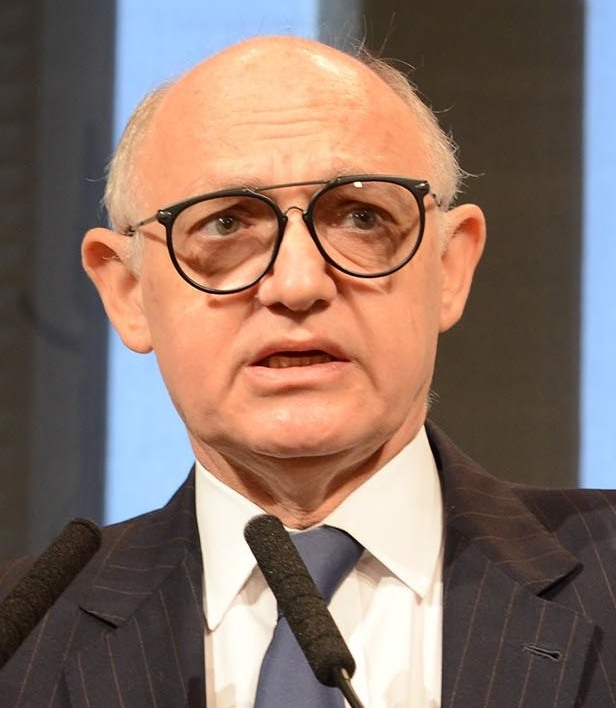

Minister of Foreign Affairs
- In office 22 June 2010 – 10 December 2015
- President: Cristina Fernández de Kirchner
- Preceded by: Jorge Taiana
- Succeeded by: Susana Malcorra

Ambassador to the United States
- In office 10 December 2007 – 18 June 2010
- President: Cristina Fernández de Kirchner
- Preceded by: José Octavio Bordón
- Succeeded by: Alfredo Chiaradía

Personal details
- Born: Héctor Marcos Timerman; 16 December 1953 Buenos Aires, Argentina
- Died: 30 December 2018 (aged 65) Buenos Aires, Argentina
- Party: Justicialist Party
- Other political affiliations: Front for Victory (2003–2018)
- Spouse: Annabella Selecki
- Education: Columbia University

Héctor Marcos Timerman (16 December 1953 – 30 December 2018) was an Argentine journalist, politician, human rights activist and diplomat. He served as his country's Minister of Foreign Affairs from 2010 to 2015, during the presidency of Cristina Fernández de Kirchner.

== Biography ==
=== Early life and career ===
Héctor Timerman was born in Buenos Aires, to Risha (née Mindlin) and Jacobo Timerman. He was of Lithuanian Jewish descent.

He was named editor-in-chief of La Tarde, one of a number of periodicals owned by his father, in 1976, and steered the daily in support of the newly installed dictatorship. His father's kidnapping on 15 April 1977 prompted Timerman to become active in the defense of human rights, however, and in 1978 he was exiled to New York City, where, in 1981, he co-founded Americas Watch, the Western Hemisphere counterpart to Helsinki Watch that proceeded the creation of the unified Human Rights Watch. He later served in the board of directors of the Fund for Free Expression, a press freedom advocacy group based in London. During his exile in the U.S., he gained American citizenship.

=== Journalist and activist ===
Timerman earned a master's degree in international relations at Columbia University in 1981, and wrote several op-ed columns for the New York Times, Los Angeles Times, Newsweek, and The Nation. After returning to Argentina in 1989, he founded two news magazines, Tres Puntos and Debate, and became a regular contributor to Noticias and Ámbito Financiero. He also hosted a television news interview program, Diálogos con Opinión. Timerman was an early adherent to Congresswoman Elisa Carrió's center-left ARI. Following elections in 2003, however, he became a close supporter of President Néstor Kirchner.

Timerman remained active in human rights advocacy. He served as a director of the Buenos Aires office of the Permanent Assembly for Human Rights from 2002 to 2004, and was President of the International Coalition of Historic Site Museums of Conscience. Timerman was the first witness to give testimony in the trial of Christian von Wernich, a former Buenos Aires Province Police chaplain convicted of complicity in numerous dictatorship-era murders and tortures (including that of his father). He published his observations on this issue in a 2005 book, Torture.

=== Foreign minister ===
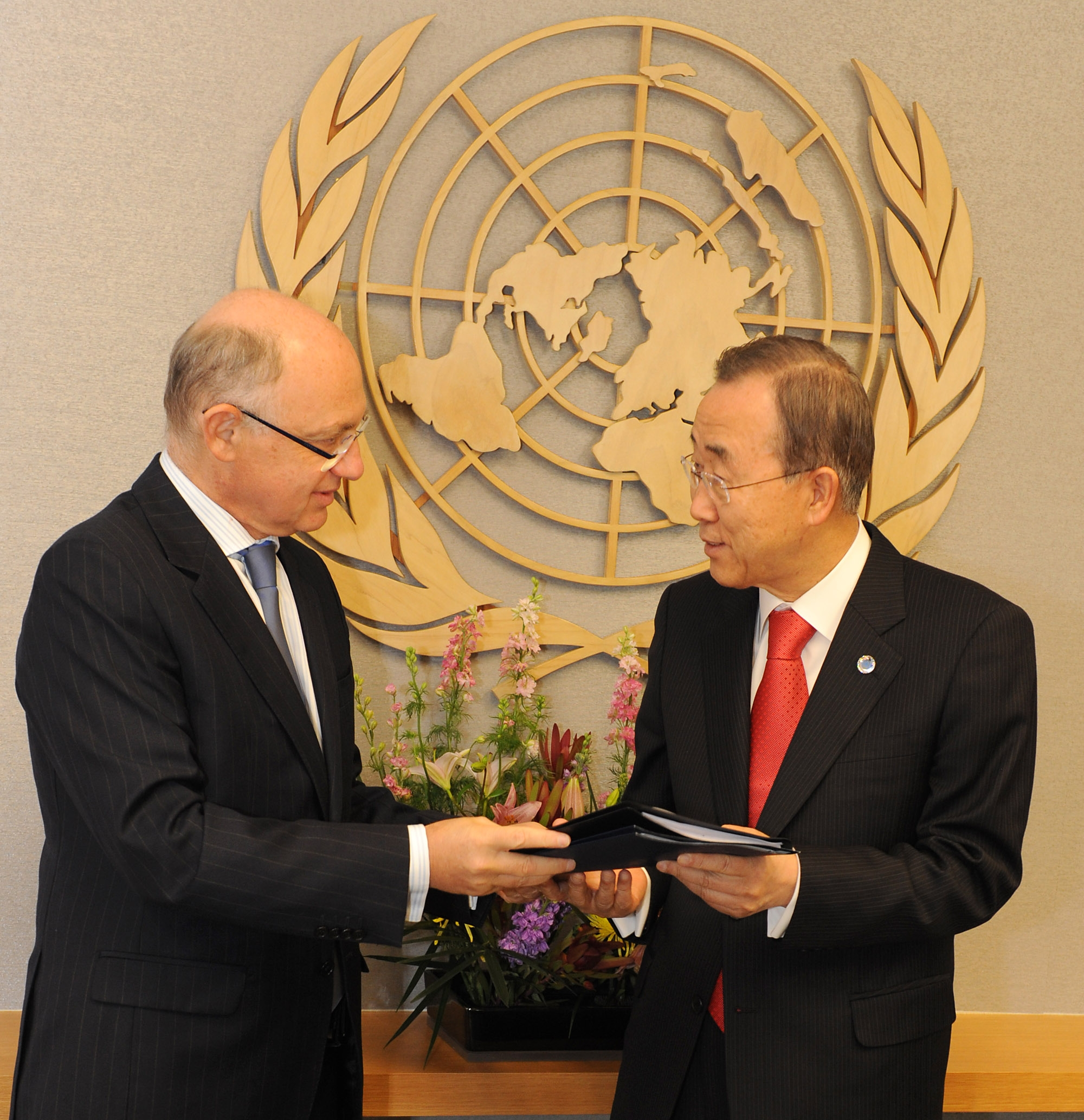
Foreign Minister Timerman and UN Secretary-General Ban Ki-moon, 10 February 2012

President Néstor Kirchner appointed Timerman Consul General in New York City in July 2004, and in December 2007, he was named Argentine Ambassador to the United States. Differences between President Cristina Kirchner and Foreign Minister Jorge Taiana, and an incident in which she called Taiana's loyalty into question, reportedly led to Taiana's resignation on 18 June 2010; Taiana's replacement by Timerman was announced the same day.

Timerman's tenure was marked by intensified diplomatic foreign controversies. Bringing perpetrators of the 1994 AMIA bombing to justice was prioritized, pursuant to which he persuaded the neighboring government of Bolivia to cut short a state visit to that country in 2011 by Iranian Defense Minister Ahmad Vahidi (whose arrest Argentine authorities had sought since 2007 in connection with the attack), while also working to establish a Truth Commission jointly with Iran in 2013 to investigate the 1994 bombing. He likewise advanced ongoing efforts against vulture funds seeking payment at face value on bonds bought from resellers for pennies on the dollar, and whose attempts to block payments all other bondholders continued to threaten Argentina's successful earlier debt restructuring.

The longstanding Falkland Islands sovereignty dispute figured prominently during Timerman's tenure as well. Timerman said, "We have been trying to find a peaceful solution for 180 years. I think the fanatics are not in Buenos Aires." His policy regarding the dispute remained assertive, refusing to accept a letter from a member of the Legislative Assembly of the Falkland Islands who ambushed Timerman following talks in February 2013 with U.K. Foreign Secretary William Hague, obtaining declarations in support of Argentine sovereignty from African and Latin American nations, and later declaring that the Falklands "will be under our control within 20 years." He nevertheless described the dispute in January 2014 as a "peaceful struggle".

=== Arrest and death ===
Timerman was arrested in late 2017 under charges of covering up Iranian involvement in the 1994 AMIA bombing which left 85 people dead. He died of cancer while he was under arrest on 30 December 2018. After his double-dealing regarding Argentine relations with Iran and the fraudulent efforts to attain justice for the 1994 AMIA bombing, the Argentine Jewish community released a joint non-condolence "no comment" release after his death.

== Honours and awards ==
=== Foreign honours ===
- Peru: Grand Cross of the Order of the Sun of Peru (21 October 2010)
- Chile: Grand Cross of the Order of Merit (20 May 2013)
- Ecuador: Grand Cross of the National Order of Merit (2 March 2016)

Political offices
Preceded by Jorge Taiana	Minister of Foreign Affairs; 2010–2015	Succeeded by Susana Malcorra
