= Secretariat of Comprehensive Policies on Drugs =

- Secretaría de Políticas; Integrales sobre Drogas
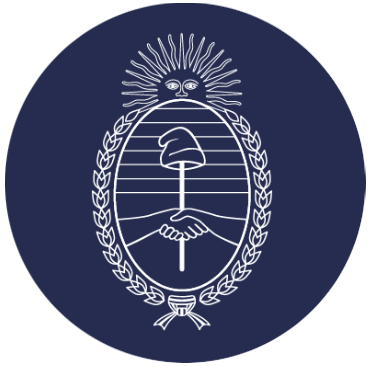

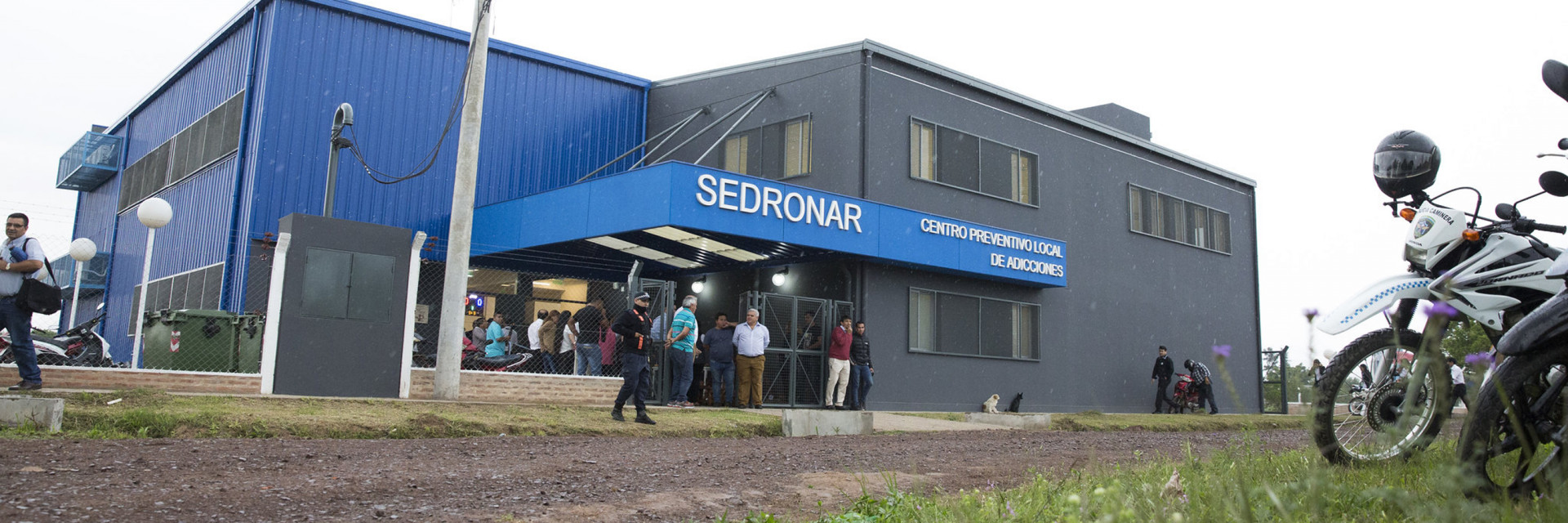
- A Sedronar building in 2020

Secretariat overview
- Formed: 1989; 37 years ago
- Jurisdiction: Argentina
- Headquarters: Sarmiento 546, Buenos Aires
- Annual budget: $ 3,155,134,395 (2021)
- Secretariat executive: Roberto Moro, Secretary
- Parent department: Ministry of Health
- Website: argentina.gob.ar/sedronar

The Secretariat of Comprehensive Policies on Drugs (Spanish: Secretaría de Políticas Integrales sobre Drogas, mostly known for its acronym SEDRONAR) is an Argentine government agency reporting to the Ministry of Health, tasked with assisting the population on drug use prevention and the treatment of drug addiction.

It was originally established in 1989 during the presidency of Carlos Menem as the "Secretariat of Programming for the Prevention of Drug Addiction and the Fight against Drug Trafficking", an agency reporting directly to the Office of the President. It was reformed to its current status in 2017, during the presidency of Mauricio Macri.

Since 13 January 2020, the Secretary of Comprehensive Policies on Drugs has been Gabriela Torres.

== History ==
The SEDRONAR was established in 1989 by president Carlos Menem through a modification of the Law on Ministries by Decree 271/89, replacing the National Coordinating Commission for the Control of Drug Trafficking and Drug Abuse (Spanish: Comisión Nacional Coordinadora para el Control del Narcotráfico y el Abuso de Drogas). Its first secretary was Alberto Lestelle, who was in office until 1995. Lestelle resigned in March 1995 after conducting an investigation into drug use among members of the National Congress; upon his resignation, Lestelle famously said that "a lot of deputies [do a bump of] cocaine in the bathroom" (Spanish: muchos diputados se dan un nariguetazo de cocaína en el baño). Lestelle was succeeded by Gustavo Green, and Julio César Aráoz and Eduardo Amadeo also headed the secretariat during the rest of Menem's presidency.

During the presidency of Fernando de la Rúa, the SEDRONAR was headed by Lorenzo Cortese, who was involved in a controversial dispute with then-INADI director (later Supreme Court justice) Eugenio Zaffaroni over his –and the government's– opposition to the decriminalization of drug use.

In 2004, President Néstor Kirchner appointed former Santa Cruz governor José Ramón Granero to the secretariat. Granero was in office through the presidencies of Kirchner and Cristina Fernández de Kirchner until his resignation in 2011. Granero was involved in a number of controversies, including the discovery of seven unidentified kilograms of cocaine in SEDRONAR vehicles in 2008 and the lack of controls in the entry of ephedrine from Mexico into Argentine territory (both for which he was tried and found innocent due to lack of evidence). Granero was finally asked his resignation by President Fernández de Kirchner due to his staunch opposition to decriminalization of drugs for personal use.

Granero's place was taken by former foreign minister Rafael Bielsa, who held the position until 2013. Bielsa was replaced by a priest, Juan Carlos Molina, who took office on 29 November 2013. Molina was a vocal supporter of decriminalizing all drugs. Under Molina's administration, the SEDRONAR cooperated with the Ministry of Federal Planning to set up two types of state-sponsored establishments aimed at curbing drug abuse and treating addictions: Casas Educativas Terapéuticas (CET, "educational therapeutic homes") and Centros Preventivos Locales de las Adicciones (CEPLA, "local preventive addiction centres"). Molina resigned for personal reasons in May 2015 and was replaced by Gabriel Lerner.

President Mauricio Macri designated Roberto Moro to the SEDRONAR on 10 December 2015. On 12 January 2017, President Macri issued a decree overhauling the SEDRONAR, renaming it as the "Secretariat of Comprehensive Policies on Drugs" (while maintaining the same acronym) and stripping it of its presidential secretariat status, reorganizing it under the Office of the Cabinet Chief. A number of functions of the SEDRONAR were also reassigned to the Ministry of Security.

== Attributions ==
The Secretariat is tasked with coordinating the Argentine state's policy on drug use and addiction. Its administration is based around two axes: reducing drug demand and reducing drug availability. On the first axis, the SEDRONAR seeks to establish communal support networks that may help reduce drug demand, thus establishing strategies and elaborating policies aimed at preventing the use of drugs. The Secretariat also cooperates with the Ministry of Security to identify and disestablish illegal drug commerce and distribution.

The SEDRONAR has two undersecretariats: the Undersecretariat of Prevention, Investigation and Statistics on Drugs (Spanish: Subsecretaría de Prevención, Investigación y Estadísticas en materia de Drogas) and the Undersecretariat of Attention and Care on Drugs (Spanish: Subsecretaría de Atención y Acompañamiento en materia de Drogas).

=== Argentine Drugs Observatory ===
The Argentine Drugs Observatory (Spanish: Observatorio Argentino de Drogas, OAD) was established in 2005 to create and interpret reliable information on the use and commerce of drugs in Argentina. On a yearly basis, the OAD conducts a nation-wide survey on the state of drug use and commerce.

== List of secretaries ==
No.	Secretary	Party	Term	President
Secretariat of Programming for the Prevention of Drug Addiction and the Fight against Drug Trafficking (1989–2017)
1	Alberto Lestelle	Justicialist Party	17 July 1989 – 17 October 1995	Carlos Menem
2	Gustavo Green	Justicialist Party	26 October 1995 – 16 February 1996	Carlos Menem
3	Julio César Aráoz	Justicialist Party	18 February 1996 – 11 April 1998	Carlos Menem
4	Eduardo Amadeo	Justicialist Party	11 April 1998 – 10 December 1999	Carlos Menem
5	Lorenzo Cortese	Radical Civic Union	19 January 2000 – 20 December 2001	Fernando de la Rúa
6	Wilbur Ricardo Grimson	Independent	25 February 2002 – 25 May 2003	Eduardo Duhalde
6	Wilbur Ricardo Grimson	Independent	25 May 2003 – 13 July 2004	Néstor Kirchner
7	José Ramón Granero	Justicialist Party	13 July 2004 – 10 December 2007	Néstor Kirchner
7	José Ramón Granero	Justicialist Party	10 December 2007 – 20 December 2011	Cristina Fernández de Kirchner
8	Rafael Bielsa	Justicialist Party	30 December 2011 – 20 March 2013	Cristina Fernández de Kirchner
9	Juan Carlos Molina	Justicialist Party	29 November 2013 – 14 May 2015	Cristina Fernández de Kirchner
10	Gabriel Lerner	Kolina	19 May 2015 – 10 December 2015	Cristina Fernández de Kirchner
11	Roberto Moro	Justicialist Party	10 December 2015 – 12 January 2017	Mauricio Macri
Secretariat of Comprehensive Policies on Drugs (2017–present)
11	Roberto Moro	Justicialist Party	12 January 2017 – 10 December 2019	Mauricio Macri
12	Gabriela Torres	Independent	13 January 2020 – December 2023	Alberto Fernández
13	Roberto Moro	Independent	Jan 2024 – present	Javier Milei
