= List of ambassadors of Argentina to Chile =

Coordinates: 33.439155°S 70.645319°W

Ambassador of Argentina to Chile
- Inaugural holder: Antonio Álvarez Jonte
- Formation: 1810

The Argentine ambassador in Santiago de Chile is the official representative of the Government in Buenos Aires to the Government of Chile.

== List of representatives ==
Diplomatic agrément/Diplomatic accreditation	Ambassador	Observations	President of Argentina	President of Chile	Term end
1810	Antonio Álvarez Jonte		Cornelio Saavedra	Mateo de Toro Zambrano y Ureta	
1812	Bernardo de Vera y Pintado	(1780–1827)	Feliciano Antonio Chiclana	Juan Martínez de Rozas	
1817	Tomás Guido		Antonio González de Balcarce	Bernardo O'Higgins	
1823	Félix de Álzaga		Juan Pedro de Aguirre	Agustín Eyzaguirre	
1825	Ignacio Álvarez Thomas		Juan Pedro de Aguirre	Agustín Eyzaguirre	
1830	José Mariño	Chargé d'affaires	Juan Manuel de Rosas	Francisco Ruiz-Tagle	
1845	Baldomero García		Juan Manuel de Rosas	Manuel Bulnes Prieto	
1853	Juan Bautista Alberdi		Juan Manuel de Rosas	Manuel Montt Torres	
1855	Carlos Lamarca (Argentine diplomat)	Chargé d'affaires	Justo José de Urquiza	Manuel Montt Torres	
1864	Domingo Faustino Sarmiento		Bartolomé Mitre	José Joaquín Pérez Mascayano	
1864	Mariano Sarratea		Bartolomé Mitre	José Joaquín Pérez Mascayano	
1869	Félix Frías		Domingo Faustino Sarmiento	José Joaquín Pérez Mascayano	
1875	Miguel Goyena	Chargé d'affaires	Nicolás Avellaneda	Federico Errázuriz Zañartu	
1877	Agustín Arroyo	Chargé d'affaires	Nicolás Avellaneda	Aníbal Pinto Garmendia	
1877	Santiago Baibiene	Chargé d'affaires	Nicolás Avellaneda	Aníbal Pinto Garmendia	
1878	Mariano Sarratea	Sarratea Tezanos Pinto, Mariano	Nicolás Avellaneda	Aníbal Pinto Garmendia	
1883	José Evaristo Uriburu		Julio Argentino Roca	Domingo Santa María González	
1889	Mariano Sánchez Fontecilla	Chargé d'affaires	Miguel Juárez Celman	José Manuel Balmaceda	
1892	Norberto Quirno Costa		Luis Sáenz Peña	Jorge Montt Álvarez	
1894	Baldomero García Sagastume	Chargé d'affaires	Luis Sáenz Peña	Jorge Montt Álvarez	
1896	Daniel García-Mansilla	Chargé d'affaires	José Evaristo Uriburu	Federico Errázuriz Echaurren	
1897	Norberto Piñero		José Evaristo Uriburu	Federico Errázuriz Echaurren	
1898	Epifanio Portela		Julio Argentino Roca	Federico Errázuriz Echaurren	
1901	José A. Terry		Julio Argentino Roca	Aníbal Zañartu	
1902	Tiburcio Venegas		Julio Argentino Roca	Aníbal Zañartu	
1904	Lorenzo Anadón		Manuel Quintana	Aníbal Zañartu	
1904	Tiburcio Benegas		Manuel Quintana	Aníbal Zañartu	
1911	Lorenzo Anadón		Roque Sáenz Peña	Elías Fernández Albano	
1913	Juan Carlos Gómez		Roque Sáenz Peña	Elías Fernández Albano	
1919	Carlos Noel	Carlos M. Noel	Hipólito Yrigoyen	Juan Luis Sanfuentes Andonaegui	
1923	Manuel Malbrán		Marcelo Torcuato de Alvear	Arturo Alessandri Palma	
1928	Federico Quintana		Hipólito Yrigoyen	Carlos Ibáñez del Campo	
1939	Eduardo Labougle Carranza		Roberto María Ortiz	Pedro Aguirre Cerda	
1940	Rodolfo Freyre		Roberto María Ortiz	Pedro Aguirre Cerda	
1940	Carlos Güiraldes		Roberto María Ortiz	Pedro Aguirre Cerda	1948
1948	Julio Argentino López Muñiz	Cnel.	Juan Perón	Alfredo Duhalde	1950
1949	Carlos Gustavo Lerena		Juan Perón	Alfredo Duhalde	1952
1953	Ismael De la Cruz Guerrero	Ismael Juan de la Cruz Guerrero	Juan Perón	Carlos Ibáñez del Campo	1955
1955	Alfonso Gregorio De Laferrere	Alfonso G. de Laferrere	Eduardo Lonardi	Carlos Ibáñez del Campo	1957
1955	Ricardo Juan Siri		Eduardo Lonardi	Carlos Ibáñez del Campo	
1957	Alejandro Lastra		Eduardo Lonardi	Carlos Ibáñez del Campo	1958
1958	Enrique Nores Martínez		Arturo Frondizi	Jorge Alessandri Rodríguez	1960
1960	Luis María de Pablo Pardo	Chargé d'affaires	Arturo Frondizi	Jorge Alessandri Rodríguez	
1961	Luis María De Pablo Pardo	Luis María de Pablo Pardo	Arturo Frondizi	Jorge Alessandri Rodríguez	1961
1961	Carlos Herrera (juez)		Arturo Frondizi	Jorge Alessandri Rodríguez	1962
1962	Nicanor Costa Méndez		José María Guido	Jorge Alessandri Rodríguez	1964
1964	Alfredo Orgaz		Arturo Umberto Illia	Eduardo Frei Montalva	1966
1966	Aquiles Guaglianone	Aquiles Horacio Guaglianone	Juan Carlos Onganía	Eduardo Frei Montalva	
1966	Manuel Malbrán	Manuel Ernesto Malbrán	Juan Carlos Onganía	Eduardo Frei Montalva	1973
1969	Javier Teodoro Gallac		Juan Carlos Onganía	Eduardo Frei Montalva	
1974	Carlos Américo Amaya	Carlos Américo Amalla	Isabel Perón	Augusto Pinochet Ugarte	1976
1976	Hugo Mario Miatello	Gral. Hugo Mario Miatello	Jorge Rafael Videla	Augusto Pinochet Ugarte	1981
1981	José Montes (militar)	Gral. José Montes	Roberto Eduardo Viola	Augusto Pinochet Ugarte	1983
1983	Oscar F. Spinosa Melo		Raúl Alfonsín	Augusto Pinochet Ugarte	1991
1984	José María Álvarez de Toledo	José M. Alvarez de Toledo	Raúl Alfonsín	Augusto Pinochet Ugarte	1989
1989	Oscar Federico Spinosa Melo		Carlos Menem	Augusto Pinochet Ugarte	1991
1992	Antonio Cafiero	interim ambassador	Carlos Menem	Patricio Aylwin Azócar	1992
1992	Eduardo Héctor Iglesias		Carlos Menem	Patricio Aylwin Azócar	1997
1997	Jorge Alberto Vásquez		Carlos Menem	Eduardo Frei Ruiz-Tagle	1998
1998	Alejandro Mosquera		Carlos Menem	Eduardo Frei Ruiz-Tagle	1999
2000	Daniel Olmos		Fernando de la Rúa	Ricardo Lagos Escobar	2002
2002	Carlos de la Rosa		Eduardo Duhalde	Ricardo Lagos Escobar	2003
2003	Carlos Enrique Abihaggle		Néstor Kirchner	Ricardo Lagos Escobar	2007
December 24, 2007	Ginés González García		Cristina Fernández de Kirchner	Michelle Bachelet	2015
January 29, 2016	José Octavio Bordón		Mauricio Macri	Michelle Bachelet	2019
5 August 2020	Rafael Bielsa		Alberto Fernández	Sebastián Piñera	2023
22 January 2024	Jorge Faurie		Javier Milei	Gabriel Boric	2024

- Argentina–Chile relations
