= Inés Pertiné Urien =

Former First Lady of Argentina

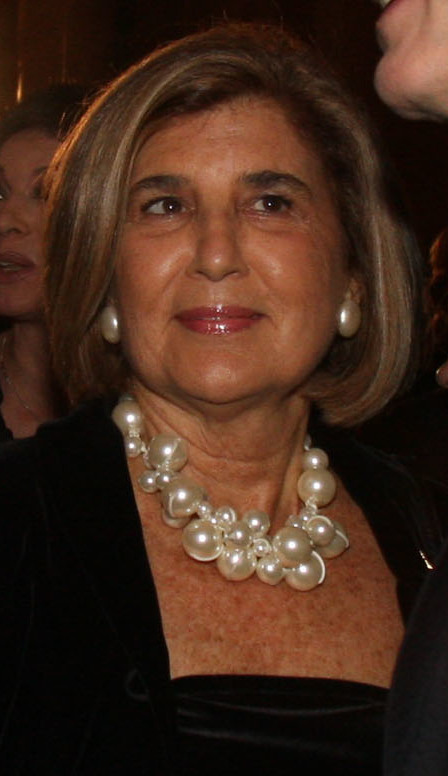
- Ines Pertine

First Lady of Argentina
- In role 10 December 1999 – 21 December 2001
- President: Fernando de la Rúa
- Preceded by: Zulema María Eva Menem
- Succeeded by: María Alicia Mazzarino

First Lady of Buenos Aires
- In role 7 August 1996 – 10 December 1999
- Governor: Fernando de la Rúa
- Preceded by: Position created
- Succeeded by: Vacant (1999–2000)

Personal details
- Born: 27 December 1942 (age 83) Buenos Aires, Argentina
- Spouse: Fernando de la Rúa (m. 1970; died 2019)
- Children: 3, including Antonio

Inés Pertiné Urien (born 27 December 1942) is an Argentine public figure and widow of former President Fernando de la Rúa. She served as First Lady of Argentina from 1999 until 2001. She also held the position of First Lady of Buenos Aires, the country's capital city, from 1996 to 1999.

Pertiné, the daughter of María Celia Urien Irigoyen and Julio Jorge Pertiné, was born on 27 December 1942. She attended colegio Asunción, which is now called San Martín de Tours. Pertiné married Fernando de la Rúa, a lawyer and politician, on 1 December 1970, after dating for three years. She was 27 years old at the time, while he was 33. The couple had three children, Antonio, Fernando and Agustina.

Honorary titles
Preceded by Zulema María Eva Menem	First Lady of Argentina; 1999–2001	Succeeded by María Alicia Mazzarino
