= Jorge Faurie =

Argentine diplomat

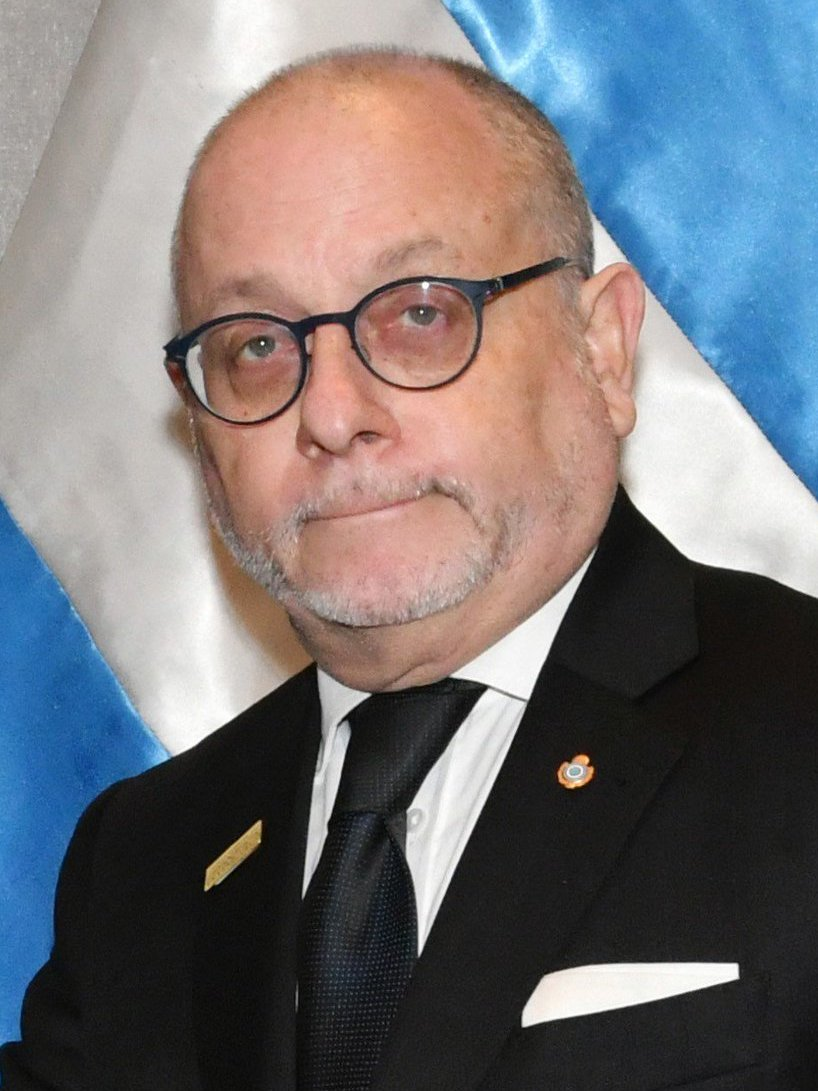

Ambassador of Argentina to Chile
- Incumbent
- Assumed office 22 January 2024
- President: Javier Milei
- Preceded by: Rafael Bielsa

Minister of Foreign Affairs and Worship
- In office 12 June 2017 – 10 December 2019
- President: Mauricio Macri
- Preceded by: Susana Malcorra
- Succeeded by: Felipe Solá

Personal details
- Born: Jorge Marcelo Faurie; 24 December 1951 (age 74) Santa Fe, Argentina
- Party: Republican Proposal
- Other political affiliations: Cambiemos (2015–present)
- Education: National University of the Littoral

Jorge Marcelo Faurie (born 24 December 1951) is an Argentine diplomat, and was Minister of Foreign Affairs and Worship of Argentina, serving in President Mauricio Macri's cabinet from 12 June 2017 to 10 December 2019. He is currently serving as the Argentine Ambassador to Chile since 22 January 2024.

He was born in Santa Fe, Santa Fe province. He graduated from National University of the Littoral at Law. He joined the foreign service in 1964. He was Argentine Ambassador to France from 2015, up to the moment of his designation as minister in 2017. He also served as an Ambassador in Portugal between 2002 and 2013.

== Minister of Foreign Relations ==
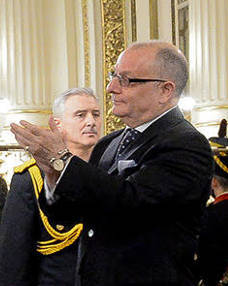
Faurie, in his first day in 2017.

During the Macri government, he strengthened diplomatic ties with Brazil and the Southern Cone, looked away from the Bolivarian axis and demanded the freedom of political prisoners in Venezuela.

He also promoted the repeal of the agreement with Iran and worked for a rapprochement with the United States, Israel and Europe.

He sought closer ties with the Pacific Alliance.

During his tenure there was a significant breakthrough in the European Union–Mercosur free trade agreement talks.

== Personal life ==
Faurie is openly gay.
