= Eduardo Vaca =

Argentine politician (1944–1998)

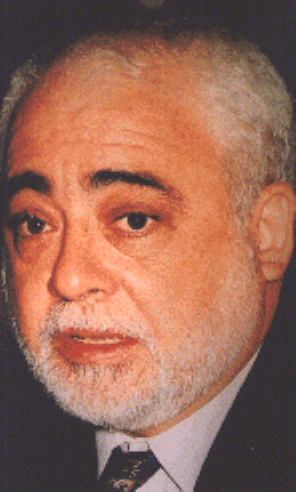

Eduardo Vaca (1944-1998) was an Argentine senator for the Justicialist Party.

Eduardo Vaca was elected deputy for the 1985-1989 period. He ran for senator and lost the 1989 elections in Buenos Aires to the radical Fernando de la Rúa. However, the PJ and the UCEDE voted for him in the electoral college, allowing him to become senator instead of De la Rúa. De la Rúa denounced him for political corruption. Vaca's political career got tied to that incident from then on. However, De la Rúa was elected senator again in 1993, and had coincidences with Vaca.

Vaca had a cerebrovascular accident in 1996, and died in 1998.
