= Labour flexibility law =

The Labour flexibility law is a former law in Argentina that was enacted in 2000 during the presidency of Fernando de la Rúa. Vice President Carlos Álvarez resigned the following year, denouncing the fact, that many legislators were bribed to support the bill in the Argentinian Congress. The law was abolished in 2004, during the presidency of Néstor Kirchner.
