= Santiago Llaver =

Argentine politician (1917–2002)

Santiago Felipe Llaver
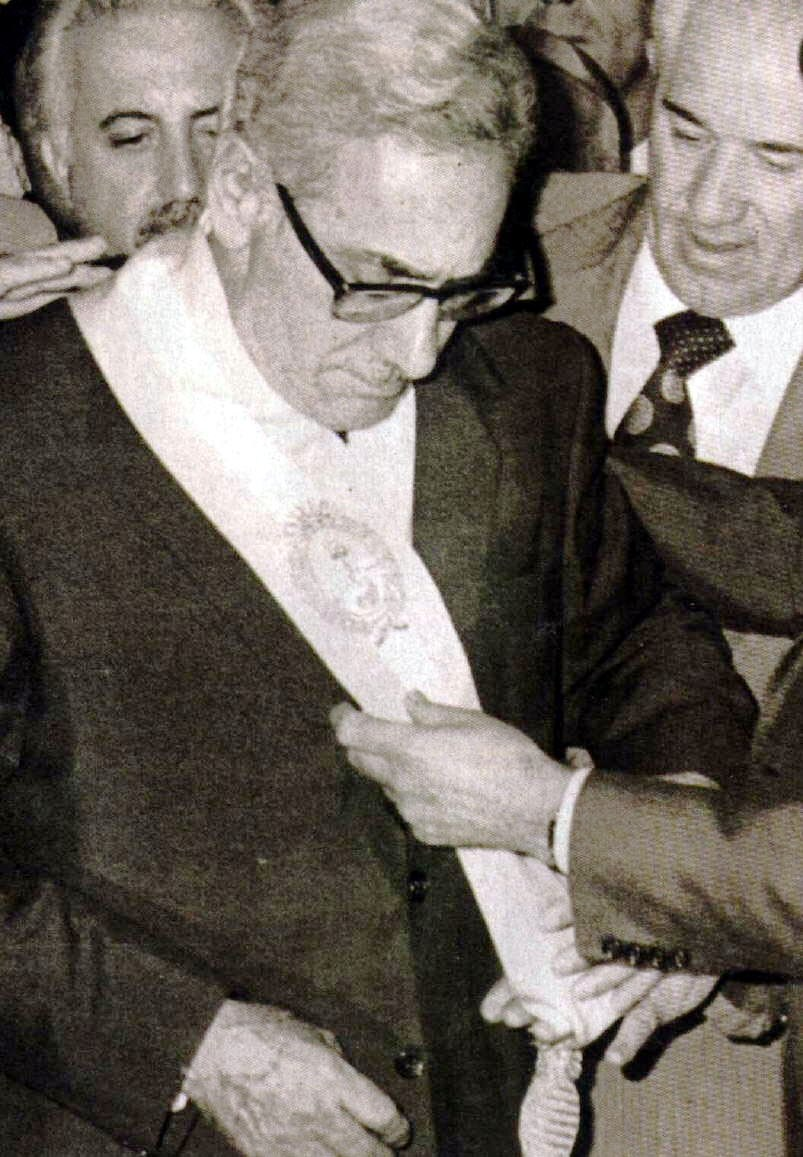
- Santaiago Felipe Llaver

Governor of Mendoza
- In office 1983–1987
- Preceded by: Eliseo Vidart Villanueva
- Succeeded by: José Bordón

Personal details
- Born: August 12, 1916 San Martín, Mendoza Province, Argentina
- Died: July 14, 2002 (aged 85) Mendoza, Argentina
- Party: Radical Civic Union
- Profession: Lawyer

Santiago Felipe Llaver (August 12, 1916 – July 14, 2002) was an Argentine lawyer and politician of the Radical Civic Union (UCR). Born in San Martín, Mendoza Province, he served as Governor of Mendoza from 1983 to 1987. He was the first democratically elected governor of the province after the end of the National Reorganization Process military dictatorship.

== Early life and education ==
Llaver was born on August 12, 1916, in the department of San Martín, Mendoza Province. His parents were of Syrian-Lebanese origin. He graduated from the National University of Córdoba in 1941, specializing in Civil, Commercial, and Constitutional Law. He went on to found and direct the Colegio Nacional General San Martín and to serve as president of the Bar Association (Colegio de Abogados) of his home department.

== Political career ==
In 1958, Llaver ran unsuccessfully for vice-governor of Mendoza alongside Leopoldo Suárez. He served as a provincial deputy between 1960 and 1962, and as a national deputy from 1963 until the military coup that ousted President Arturo Illia in 1966.

He was an early member of the Movimiento de Renovación y Cambio (Movement for Renewal and Change), the internal Radical Civic Union faction led by Raúl Alfonsín. On October 30, 1983, Llaver was elected governor of Mendoza.

On January 26, 1985, a magnitude 6.2 earthquake struck the Gran Mendoza area at 00:06, killing six people, injuring around 250, and destroying more than 12,000 homes—most of them adobe constructions. Llaver declared a state of emergency and established an emergency committee, coordinating reconstruction efforts with the national government and the Banco Hipotecario. The response resulted in the construction of several new neighborhoods, including the Barrio 26 de Enero in Las Heras, all under the so-called Plan Sismo.

Llaver is remembered for taking the "Nihuil" hydroelectric power stations on the Atuel River, in a breach of contract by the National Government to transfer money to complete the work.

Preceded by Eliseo Vidart Villanueva	Governor of Mendoza; 1983 – 1987	Succeeded by José Bordón
