= Daniela Ramos =

Colombian model and designer

- Born: Daniela Ramos Lalinde; February 8, 1988 (age 38); Cali, Colombia
- Partner: Antonio de la Rúa (2012–2019)
- Children: 2
- Beauty pageant titleholder
- Title: Miss Mundo Colombia 2009
- Major competitions: Miss Mundo Colombia 2009; (Winner); Miss World 2009; (Top 7)

Daniela Ramos Lalinde (born February 8, 1988) is a Colombian designer, model and beauty pageant titleholder who won Miss Mundo Colombia 2009 and represented Colombia at Miss World 2009 where she placed Top 7.

== Personal life ==
Lalinde has two children from her relationship with Antonio de la Rúa, a daughter named Zulú and a son named Mael.
