= Antonio de la Rúa =

Argentine lawyer

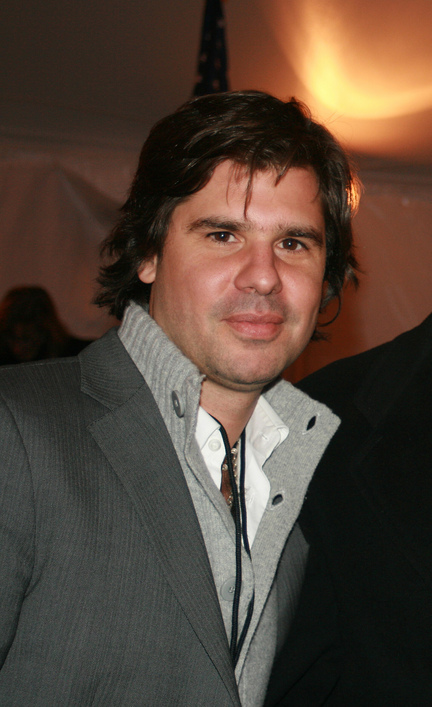
- de la Rúa in 2009
- Born: Antonio de la Rúa Pertiné; 7 March 1974 (age 52); Córdoba, Argentina
- Occupation: Lawyer
- Partners: Shakira (1999–2010); Daniela Ramos (2012–2019)
- Children: 2
- Parents: Fernando de la Rúa (father); Inés Pertiné Urien (mother)

Antonio de la Rúa Pertiné (born 7 March 1974) is an Argentine lawyer, and the son of former president Fernando de la Rúa (who governed Argentina from 1999 to 2001) and Inés Pertiné. He was an advisor to his father during his father's presidency and one of the heads of his father's presidential campaign. He is also Shakira's ex-boyfriend.

== Politics ==
Though de la Rúa held no formal position in his father's government, he was the chief architect of his father's election campaign; his success led his father to continue to turn to him for political advice after his assumption of the presidency. He was pointed to as the leader of the "Sushi set" (El grupo sushi), a group of young officials so-called due to their alleged preference for expensive Japanese cuisine; they were sometimes criticised for their influence on politics. After the collapse of the de la Rúa presidency, de la Rúa focused his energies on philanthropy and distanced himself from politics, thus marking the end of the influence of the "Sushi Group".

== Personal life ==
De la Rúa was a target of paparazzi coverage after his father became president. In 1999, he started dating the Colombian singer Shakira. On 10 January 2011, Shakira announced on her website that after 11 years together, she and de la Rúa had separated in August 2010 after making "a mutual decision to take time apart from [their] romantic relationship." She wrote that the couple "view this period of separation as temporary and as a time of individual growth as [they] continue to be partners in [their] business and professional lives", with de la Rúa overseeing Shakira's "business and career interests as he has always done." In September 2012, he filed a lawsuit for $250 million against Shakira. His lawsuit was dismissed by a Los Angeles County Superior Court judge in August 2013.

He has two children, a daughter named Zulú and a son named Mael, from his later relationship with DJ Daniela Ramos.

== ALAS ==
In December 2006, de la Rúa, together with a group of prominent Latin American businessmen and artists, founded ALAS Foundation. Foundation ALAS is a non-profit organization that promotes Early Childhood Development in Hispanic America.

Foundation ALAS had Nobel Prize winner Gabriel García Márquez as its Honorary President. Its founding members include de la Rúa, Carlos Slim, and Alejandro Bulgheroni among others.

On 22 February 2010, Antonio de la Rúa and Shakira were invited to the White House where they discussed with President Barack Obama the importance of investing in Early Childhood Development Policies.
