= José Octavio Bordón =

Argentine politician and diplomat

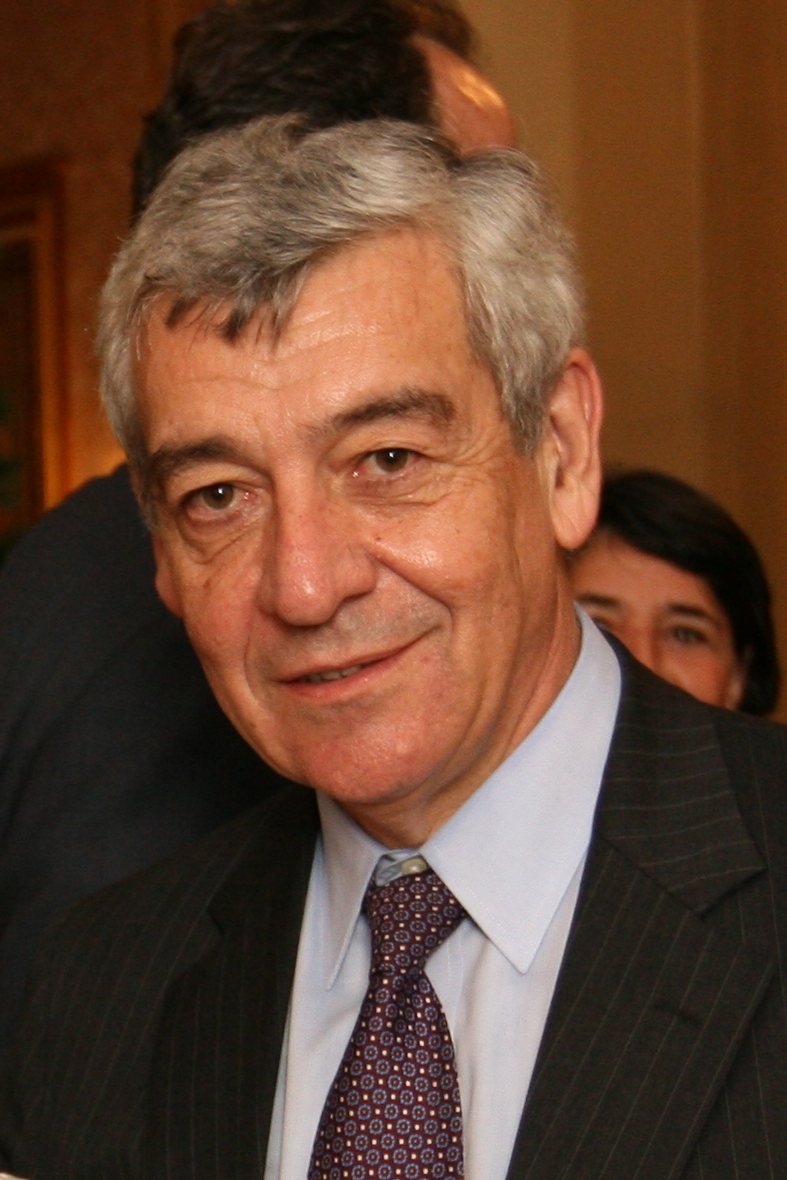
- Bordón in June 2010

Argentine Ambassador to Chile
- In office 29 January 2016 – 10 December 2019
- President: Mauricio Macri
- Preceded by: Ginés González García
- Succeeded by: Rafael Bielsa

Argentine Ambassador to the United States
- In office 25 May 2003 – 10 December 2007
- President: Néstor Kirchner
- Preceded by: Eduardo Amadeo
- Succeeded by: Héctor Timerman

National Senator
- In office 10 December 1992 – 10 December 1996
- Constituency: Mendoza

Governor of Mendoza
- In office 10 December 1987 – 10 December 1991
- Preceded by: Santiago Llaver
- Succeeded by: Rodolfo Gabrielli

National Deputy
- In office 10 December 1983 – 10 December 1987
- Constituency: Mendoza

Personal details
- Born: 22 December 1945 (age 80) Rosario, Santa Fe Province, Argentina
- Party: Justicialist Party (1983–95); Frepaso (1995–96)
- Spouse: Monica González Gaviola
- Profession: Academic

José Octavio Bordón (born 22 December 1945) is an Argentine politician and diplomat. He was governor of Mendoza Province from 1987 to 1991, and served in both houses of the National Congress as a National Deputy and a National Senator. Most recently, he was the Argentine ambassador to the United States from 2003 to 2007 and to Chile from 2016 to 2019.

Bordón ran in the 1995 presidential election, finishing second with 29.4% of the vote, behind Carlos Menem.

== Life and career ==
Born in Rosario in 1945, Bordón graduated in sociology from the Universidad del Salvador in Buenos Aires in 1970. He was Professor of Political Sociology at Universidad Nacional de Cuyo from 1972 to 1976, and again from 1983 to 1995. He became President of the Fundación Andina in 1982. In 1983 he was elected to the Argentine Chamber of Deputies as deputy for Mendoza Province for the Justicialist Party. He was deputy chairman of the foreign affairs committee.

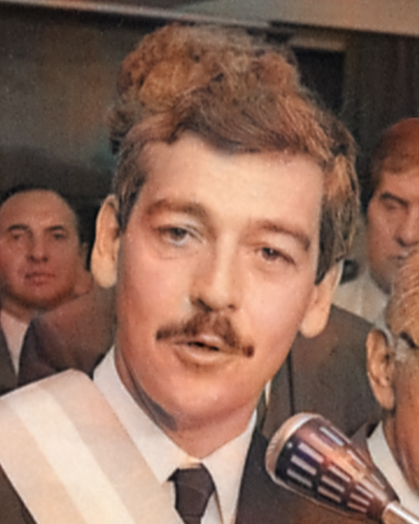
Bordón at his inauguration as Governor of Mendoza, 1987

In 1987 Bordón was elected governor of Mendoza Province, stepping down in 1991. The following year he was elected to the Argentine Senate. Over that period he had become distant from the Peronist leadership, which under President Carlos Menem had moved to the right with neoliberal economic policies. In 1994 he led his followers into a new leftwing alliance, FrePaSo, with other parties and dissident Peronists. FrePaSo's popularity grew quickly. At that time he was a visiting professor at Georgetown University.

Bordón became presidential candidate for FrePaSo for the 1995 general elections, with Carlos Chacho Álvarez as his running mate. Despite being such a new party, Frepaso came in second with 30% (and first in Buenos Aires), relegating the well-established UCR, Argentina's oldest political party still in existence, to third place. However, not long after the election, Bordón fell out with FrePaSo in a leadership dispute and returned to the Justicialist Party.

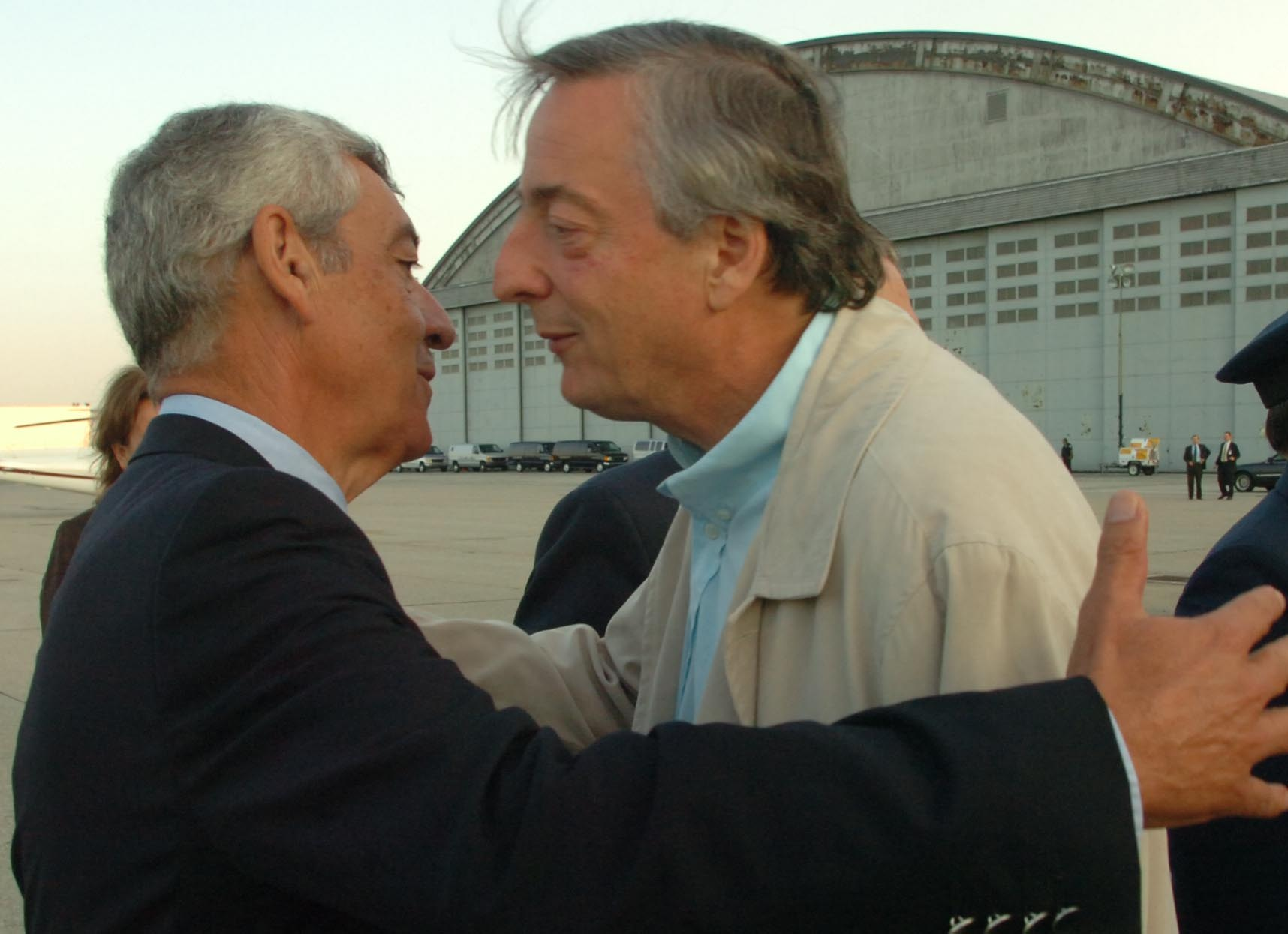
Ambassador Bordón (left) with President Néstor Kirchner in 2006

Bordón worked as a consultant at the Inter-American Development Bank from 1998 until 1999, and then again in 2003. He was Director of Diálogo y Perspectiva Internacional magazine 1989–94, and Director of Temas de MERCOSUR magazine 1996–2000.

Bordón served as General Director of Culture and Education for Buenos Aires Province from 1999 until 2001, and as Executive Director of the Social and Economic Development Program, from 2002 to 2003. President Néstor Kirchner appointed Bordón Ambassador to the United States in June 2003, and he remained in the post throughout Kirchner's term, until December 2007.

The prominent diplomat and politician is a member of the Inter-American Dialogue, is married to the former Mónica González Gaviola and has three children. Bordón suffered a fall while on vacation in Cariló. Hospitalized in nearby Pinamar, his condition was deemed stable.

Political offices
Preceded by Santiago Llaver	Governor of Mendoza; 1987–1991	Succeeded by Rodolfo Gabrielli
Diplomatic posts
Preceded by Eduardo Amadeo	Argentine Ambassador to the United States; 2003–2007	Succeeded by Héctor Timerman
Preceded by Ginés González García	Argentine Ambassador to Chile; 2016–2019	Succeeded by Rafael Bielsa
