= Carlos Álvarez (Argentine politician) =

Argentine politician (born 1948)

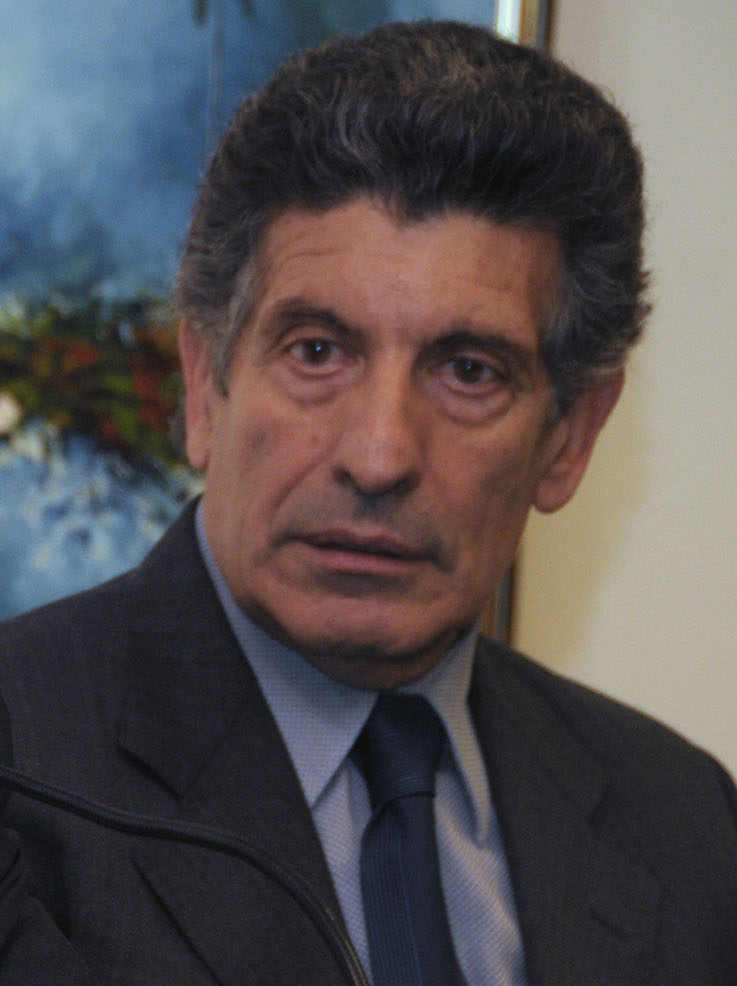
- Álvarez in 2010

General Secretary of ALADI
- In office 1 September 2011 – 1 September 2017
- Preceded by: José Félix Fernández Estigarribia
- Succeeded by: Alejandro de la Peña Navarrete

President of Mercosur CRPM
- In office 9 December 2005 – 9 December 2009
- Preceded by: Eduardo Duhalde
- Succeeded by: Gregorio García Biagosch

32nd Vice President of Argentina
- In office 10 December 1999 – 6 October 2000
- President: Fernando de la Rúa
- Preceded by: Carlos Ruckauf
- Succeeded by: Daniel Scioli

National Deputy
- In office 10 December 1989 – 10 December 1999
- Constituency: City of Buenos Aires

Personal details
- Born: 26 December 1948 (age 77) Buenos Aires, Argentina
- Party: Broad Front (since 1993); Independent (1989–1993); Justicialist Party (until 1989)
- Other political affiliations: Front for a Country in Solidarity (1994–1997); Alliance for Work, Justice and Education (1997–2001); Front for Victory (2003–2017); Frente de Todos (since 2019)
- Spouse(s): Marta Chojo; Gloria López Lecube; Liliana Chiernajowsky
- Education: University of Buenos Aires
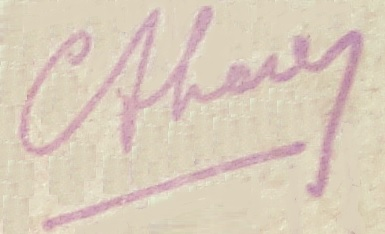
- Signature

Carlos Alberto Álvarez (Spanish pronunciation: [ˈkaɾlos ˈtʃatʃo ˈalβaɾes]; born 26 December 1948) is an Argentine politician. He was Vice President of Argentina during the first 10 months of President Fernando de la Rúa's term, and headed the ALADI Secretariat from 2011 to 2017.

== Biography ==
Álvarez was born in Buenos Aires. His father was a printing worker, and the younger Álvarez's first experience in politics would be in the splinter trade union CGT de los Argentinos, formed in 1968 by Raimundo Ongaro. He earned his degree in history at the University of Buenos Aires. Álvarez married three times in his youth: Marta Chojo, Gloria López Lecube, and Liliana Chiernajowsky. He had two daughters with his second wife, though his third marriage would be the most enduring. He met Liliana Chiernajowsky, who had spent 7 years as a political prisoner during the Dictadura Civico-Militar, shortly after her release in 1981. They had one daughter.

He served as an adviser at the Regional Economies Commission of the Argentine Senate from 1983 to 1989. Álvarez established Unidos in 1985, a periodical in support of the progressive wing of the Justicialist Party that would become influential in Argentine universities through the student organization APU. He was elected National Deputy for the Justicialist Party in 1989, but split from the party shortly afterward over disagreements with President Carlos Menem's turn to the right, creating an independent caucus known as The Group of Eight.

Álvarez joined a group of politicians of different progressive parties, as well as former Justicialists, in 1991 to create the Frente Grande coalition party. He was again elected congressman for the 1993–97 period, as well as a member of the Constitutional Convention that drafted the 1994 amendment of the Argentine Constitution. He took part in the creation of the FrePaSo coalition in 1994. Nominated candidate for vice-president on José Octavio Bordón's ticket, they obtained second place in the 1995 presidential elections.

FrePaSo joined the Radical Civic Union in 1997 to form the Alliance for Work, Justice and Education (usually known as the Alianza). Álvarez was reelected that year to the Chamber of Deputies, this time within the Alianza, in 1997. He ran again as a vice-presidential nominee in 1999, and was elected Vice President of Argentina with Alianza nominee Fernando de la Rúa in the 1999 presidential elections. Revelations of bribery on the part of President de la Rúa in the passage of a labour flexibility law bill in 2000 led Álvarez to resign his post on 6 October 2000, denouncing corruption in the administration and in the Senate. His resignation was followed a year later by de la Rúa's own resignation in the face of the December 2001 riots in Argentina.

He retired from public life for five years. His marriage to Liliana Chiernajowsky ended, and his notable later relationships included those with politician Vilma Ibarra and actress Soledad Silveyra. He was appointed as President of Mercosur's permanent representatives committee, CRPM (Comisión de Representantes Permanentes del Mercosur). He took office on 9 December 2005, was reelected in 2007, and served until December 2009. Álvarez underwent vascular bypass surgery in 2009, and recovered. He took office as General Secretary of the Latin American regional trade organization, ALADI (Asociación Latinoamericana de Integración), on 1 September 2011 and served in that capacity for six years.

Political offices
Preceded by Carlos Ruckauf	Vice President of Argentina; 1999–2000	Succeeded by Daniel Scioli
