= ALAS Foundation =

Non-profit organization for children in Latin America

ALAS (Fundación América Latina en Acción Solidaria) is a non-profit foundation with the intent to launch a new social movement for a collective commitment to comprehensive Early Childhood Development programs in Latin America.

ALAS was founded in 2006 by Colombian singer and UNICEF ambassador Shakira, and its Honorary President was Nobel laureate Gabriel García Márquez.

Notable members of ALAS include Latin artists Juanes, Alejandro Sanz, and Miguel Bosé.

== History ==
The ALAS Foundation, formally known as Fundación América Latina en Acción Solidaria, was founded in December 2006 by Shakira, a Colombian singer and UNICEF ambassador, with the intent to launch a social movement focused on comprehensive early childhood development programs in Latin America. Its administrative headquarters are based in Panama, emphasizing its regional focus. The foundation’s honorary president was Gabriel García Márquez, and its notable members include Latin artists Juanes, Alejandro Sanz, and Miguel Bosé. The initial purpose of the foundation was to combat hunger and marginalization, with specific programs like support for pregnant mothers, vaccinations, and birth registration.

In 2008, ALAS received $200 million from donations.

In 2010, ALAS expanded its impact through the $300 million Early Childhood Initiative: A Lifelong Investment, launched with the World Bank to expand early childhood development programs in Latin America and the Caribbean. By February 2011, the initiative had benefited over half a million children through nutrition and healthcare programs and donations of over $100 million.

In 2011 the ALAS – IDB Award was established jointly with the Inter-American Development Bank (IDB). This award recognizes high-quality programs combining early education, psychosocial stimulation, nutrition, health, and family support. The first awards were presented in 2012.

In mid-2016, ALAS, led by Shakira and businessman Alejandro Santo Domingo, worked to have a swift debate and pass of a bill authored by Representative Eduardo José Tous de la Ossa to establish the "De Cero a Siempre" early childhood strategy, integrating health, nutrition, and education, as a permanent state policy in Colombia. Shakira persuaded the senate to support the initiative so that “the rights of children under 6 are protected.” After clearing three legislative stages, the bill, which aimed to ensure sustained funding and access for vulnerable children despite over 2.4 million under five still lacking benefits per DANE statistics, received its final approval in the Senate plenary on May 24, 2016, following a 62-1 vote. Supported by figures like Senator Efraín Cepeda and First Lady María Clemencia Rodríguez de Santos, who celebrated it as a victory for Colombia’s children, the law’s passage marked a historic commitment to early childhood development, securing resources and bipartisan backing to reduce vulnerability and promote equity for the nation’s youngest citizens before the legislative session ended in mid-June. The passage was hailed by Fundación Alas Executive Director Juan Antonio Pungiluppi as a critical step after over a decade of advocacy.

== Concerts ==
On 17 May 2008, for the first time, two concerts were held simultaneously in Argentina and Mexico. Shakira, Alejandro Sanz, Calle 13, Paulina Rubio, Gustavo Cerati and other artists performed in Buenos Aires, where 150 thousand people gathered. In Mexico City, Miguel Bosé, Ricky Martin, Chayanne, Lucero and Diego Torres were some of the artists on the stage list. Juanes did not participate in either concert. The concert in Mexico was attended by approximately 200.000 people. Both concerts were free. The goal was to make the public aware of the problems around poverty of Latin-American children.

== Controversy ==
In response to allegations of mismanagement over the appointment of Lautaro García Batallán as executive director, who had a background linked to a corruption scandal, Antonio de la Rúa, one the organization's Vice Presidents, denied the claims, and explained that there was neither evidence of mismanagement, nor a reason for the recent exodus of many of the members.

== ALAS – IDB Award ==
The ALAS – IDB Award was created in 2011 jointly by the Inter-American Development Bank (IADB) and the ALAS Foundation to recognize "high quality, suitable intensity and length programs and interventions that combine early education, psychosocial stimulation, nutrition, health and works with the family".

=== Award Categories ===
- Best Center
- Best Educator
- Best Publication
- Best Innovation
