= 2000 congressional bribery scandal in Argentina =

Allegations of corruption in government

The 2000 congressional bribery scandal in Argentina was a scandal involving allegations of corruption that took place in Argentina in April 2000. The scandal traces its origins to Fernando de la Rúa, the president at that time, introducing a bill to the National Congress to reduce corporation costs, which was approved and officially became Law 25,250 (Labour flexibility law) on 11 May 2000. Following the passing of the law, however, it was investigated whether de la Rua's government, which belonged to the Radical Civic Union party, bribed senators of the Justicialist Party for their support in passing the law. As a result of the scandal, the law became known as the "Banelco Law", after an ATM network allegedly utilized in the bribery scheme.

The Argentine justice ultimately concluded that there was no evidence of the alleged bribery. Nonetheless, the scandal is considered one of the main reasons for the resignation of De la Rúa's vice president Carlos Álvarez, on 6 October 2000. This episode caused a break in the political coalition between the Radical Party and the FREPASO party, which altogether formed the Alliance for Work, Justice and Education, the political alliance under which de la Rúa was elected president. Furthermore, this rupture exacerbated the crisis that de la Rua's government was already facing.

== History ==
=== Bill ===
In January 2000, De la Rúa, following the advice of the International Monetary Fund (IMF), sent to Congress a labor reform bill that included among other items:

- An extension of the employment probation period
- A two-year suspension of collective agreements coverage established prior to 1975
- The possibility to allow independent corporative agreements instead of operating under agreements by different industries and their respective branches
- Creation of a Federal Service of Mediation and Arbitration

De la Rua's office gained the support of the Secretary of the General Confederation of Labor, Héctor Daer. This support raised opposition from a segment inside of this confederation that was led by Hugo Moyano, who confronted Daer and called for an assembly that culminated in declaring him as the new general secretary of the confederation. However, this was not recognized by Daer, which led to a breakup inside this organization.

At that time, the majority of the House of Representatives was from the Radical Party which favored the President's agenda. The senate, on the other hand, was mostly composed of the opposition (Justicialist Party) that allegedly was against this bill. Even though Moyano did not believe that the law was going to pass, he still called for a general strike against its passage. Nonetheless, on 11 May 2000 this bill finally passed the Senate, on the condition that the minimum wage could not decrease for the next two years.

=== Corruption allegations ===
Hugo Moyano addressed the press on 29 May 2000 declaring that Alberto Flamarique, who was the labor minister at that time, had said "we have Banelco (e-transfers) to convince senators", supposedly implying that the government can easily buy votes from senators. Purportedly, this took place in a meeting with the Sanitation Workers Syndicate while discussing the terms of the new law. Flamarique denied these accusations. On the other hand, Moyano reaffirmed what Flamarique allegedly said.

This scandal led to a political crisis that culminated with the resignation of the vice president Carlos Alvarez who was part of the Frepaso Party. This Party, in spite of being an ally of President de la Rua, voted mostly against this law.

In 2003 the parliamentary secretary Mario Pontaquarto declared in an interview, that he took part in an operation to bribe senators through the Secretariat of Intelligence (SIDE). The journalist, Maria Villosio, said that allegedly the negotiations to buy senators' votes took place in the president's office and the president himself had said "Deal with Santibañes." who at that time was the head of the SIDE.

== Trial ==
In December 2003, Mario Pontaquarto was subpoenaed by Judge Norberto Oyarbide, who was then replacing the assigned Judge Canicoba Corral. Pontaquarto stated that he transported 5 million dollars taken from the Secretariat of Intelligence's fund to Senator Emilio Cantarero's house. This amount of money was supposed to be divided among four senators in exchange for positive votes to pass the law. In addition, Pontaquarto declared that Senator Jose Genoud and Minister of Labor Alberto Flamarique, allegedly also received money.

In 2005, this case was declared a mistrial. Daniel Rafecas was assigned as the new judge for this case and a new investigation began. Rafecas indicted the former parliamentary secretary Pontaquarto, President de la Rua, former Secretary of Intelligence Santibañes, former Minister of Labor Flamarique, and the Senators Alberto Tell, Remo Costazo, Ricardo Branda, and Augusto Alasino.

In 2016, after an investigation of the movement of money from the Secretariat of Intelligence accounts, it was determined that there was no evidence that support Pontaquarto's version. All the people that were indicted were acquitted by Judges Miguel Pons, Guillermo Gordo, and Fernando Ramirez because they considered that it was not possible to prove that a felony had been committed.

== Repeal ==
The infamous Banelco Law was repealed in 2004 by the government of president Nestor Kirchner, who introduced another law to replace it. The new law received 215 votes in favor, 23 against, and 1 abstention. This time the law passage had the consent of the main unions of the country.
