= Rafael Bielsa =

Argentine politician

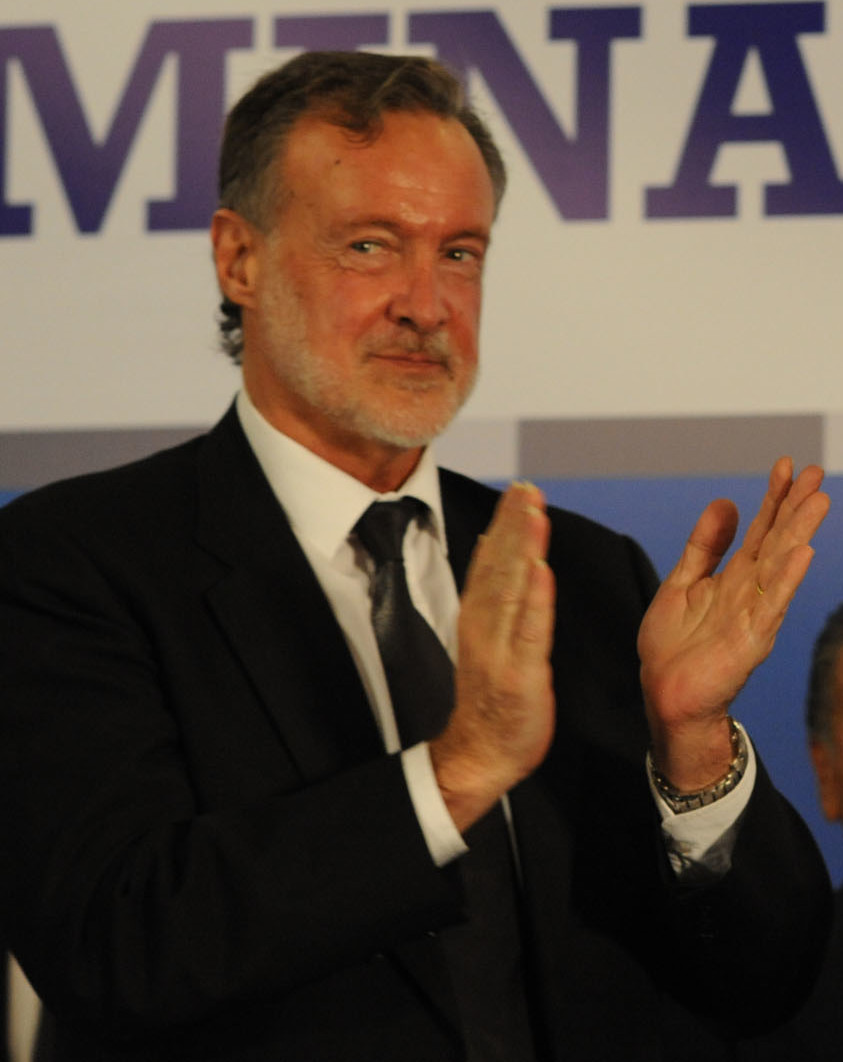

Ambassador of Argentina to Chile
- In office 5 August 2020 – 10 December 2023
- Preceded by: José Octavio Bordón
- Succeeded by: Jorge Faurie

National Deputy
- In office 10 December 2005 – 7 November 2007
- Constituency: Santa Fe

Minister of Foreign Affairs
- In office 25 May 2003 – 3 December 2005
- President: Néstor Kirchner
- Preceded by: Carlos Ruckauf
- Succeeded by: Jorge Taiana

Personal details
- Born: February 15, 1953 (age 73) Rosario, Argentina
- Party: Justicialist Party
- Other political affiliations: Front for Victory (2003–2007)

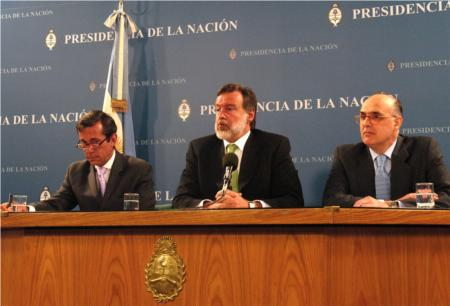
Rafael Bielsa (center), speaking in the press room of the Casa Rosada on 4 October 2005

Rafael Antonio Bielsa Caldera (born February 15, 1953) is an Argentine Justicialist Party politician from Rosario, province of Santa Fe. He was the Minister of Foreign Affairs from 2003 to 2005. From 2020 to 2023 he was also Argentina's ambassador to Chile.

== Early life and education ==
Bielsa spent his childhood in Morteros, Córdoba, the birthplace of his mother. He studied at the Faculty of Law of the National University of Rosario and became a lawyer. Bielsa is also a poet, writer and essayist. He is the brother of former Argentina national football team coach Marcelo Bielsa; both are well-known Newell's Old Boys supporters. He is also the brother of architect María Eugenia Bielsa, Vice-Governor of Santa Fe from 2003 to 2007 and Minister of Habitat from 2019 to 2020.

In 1974 Bielsa began at the Federal Court of Rosario. In 1977, during the Dirty War, suspected of being a member of the Montoneros radical guerrilla group, Bielsa was detained and taken to the "El Castillo" illegal detention centre (also known as "El Fortín"), where he spent two months of questioning and torture. After a period in Spain, he returned to Argentina in 1980, and started working in different positions of the military government, mainly in the Ministry of Justice.

== Political career ==
Upon the return to democracy in 1983, Bielsa worked in a Secretariat of the Ministry of Education in different functions. He served as adviser to the Office of the President of Argentina during the early years of the Carlos Menem administration, at the Ministry of Justice, as well as for specific international projects and other posts. He published several books of poetry during the 1980s and 1990s.

Bielsa was the foreign minister of Argentina from 25 May 2003, when President Néstor Kirchner took office, until 6 December 2005. At the 2005 legislative elections he won a seat in the Argentine Chamber of Deputies, representing the Autonomous City of Buenos Aires. At the last moment (just before the inauguration ceremony), after a request by the President, he chose not to take office, instead accepting an appointment to become Ambassador in France; however, the next day he retracted (citing moral qualms and the pressure from public opinion as the reason) and decided to occupy his legislative seat after all. Both decisions were heavily criticized by the opposition and political analysts in the media; the latter one was also qualified in harsh terms by government supporters themselves. Bielsa remained close to the President despite these problems.

He competed with fellow party member Agustín Rossi in the primary elections held on 1 July 2007, and was elected candidate of the Justicialist Party for the governorship of Santa Fe by a wide margin. He lost the main election, on 2 September, to the Socialist former mayor of Rosario Hermes Binner. Bielsa received 38.8% of the vote. After acknowledging the defeat, he announced he would also be resigning from his post as representative for Buenos Aires, which he did five days later.

From 2011 to 2013, Bielsa was the secretary in charge of the Secretariat of Programming for the Prevention of Drug Addiction and the Fight against Drug Trafficking (SEDRONAR).

== Honours and awards ==
=== National honours ===
- Illustrious Citizen of Buenos Aires (12 March 2019)

=== Foreign honours ===
- Peru: Grand Cross of the Order of the Sun of Peru (9 June 2004)
- Chile: Grand Cross of the Order of Bernardo O'Higgins (9 February 2005)
- Brazil: Grand Cross of the Order of the Southern Cross (19 May 2005)
