= Carlos de la Rosa =

Argentine lawyer and politician (1944–2022)

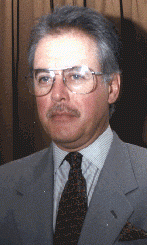
- De la Rosa in 1997

Argentina Ambassador to Chile
- In office 2002–2003
- President: Eduardo Duhalde
- Preceded by: Daniel Olmos
- Succeeded by: Carlos Enrique Abihaggle

Member of the Argentine Senate
- In office 10 December 1995 – 9 December 2001
- Constituency: Mendoza

Intendant of Godoy Cruz
- In office 10 December 1987 – 10 December 1991
- Preceded by: Roberto Tuninetti
- Succeeded by: Ruben Montemayor

Personal details
- Born: Carlos Leonardo de la Rosa; 2 March 1944
- Died: 27 October 2022 (aged 78)
- Party: PJ
- Education: National University of Cuyo; Universidad de Mendoza
- Occupation: Lawyer

Carlos Leonardo de la Rosa (2 March 1944 – 27 October 2022) was an Argentine lawyer, diplomat, and politician. A member of the Justicialist Party, he served in the Argentine Senate from 1995 to 2001. He was also ambassador to Chile from 2002 to 2003.

De la Rosa died on 27 October 2022, at the age of 78.
