= Fernando de la Rúa =

President of Argentina from 1999 to 2001

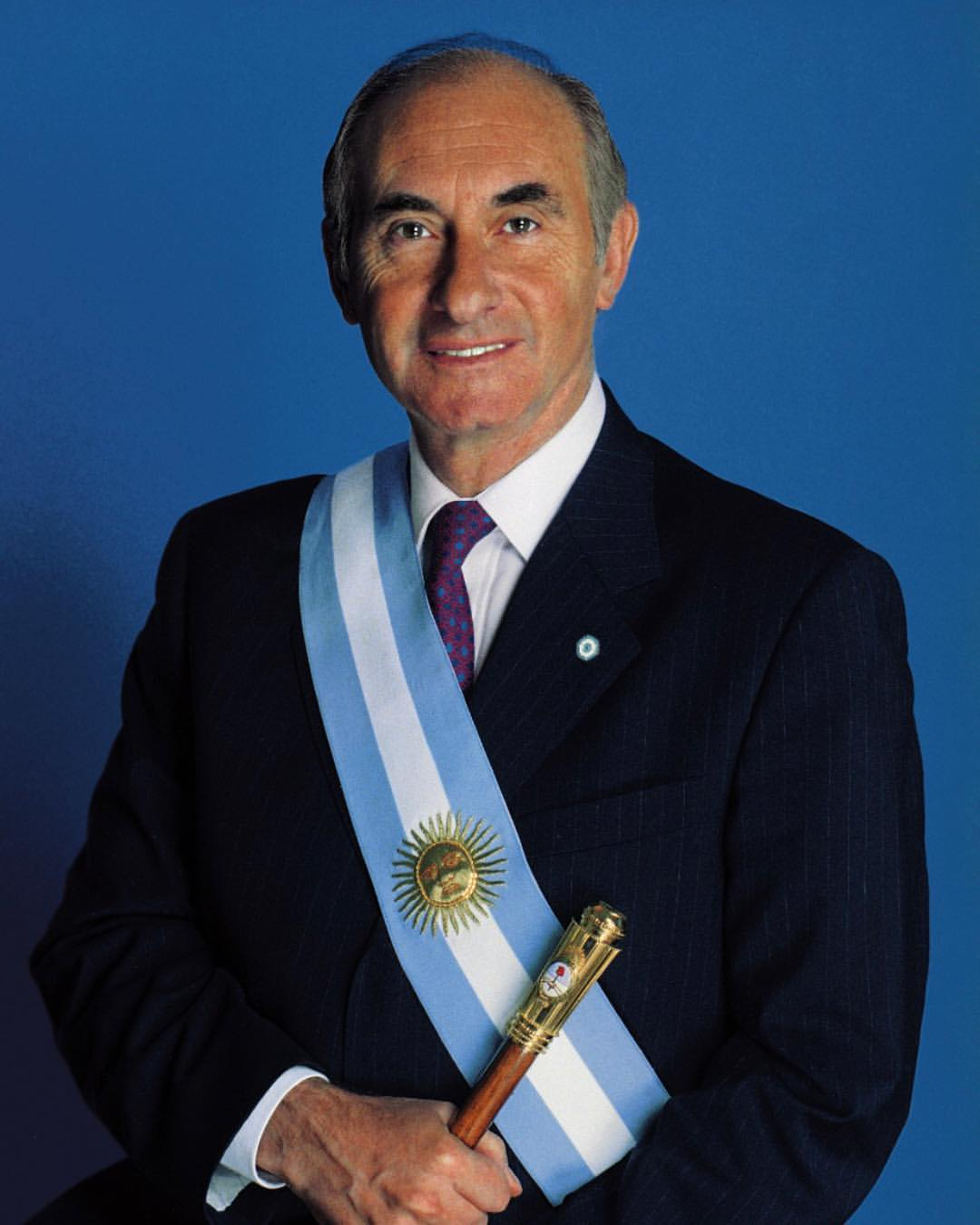
- Official portrait, 1999

51st President of Argentina
- In office 10 December 1999 – 21 December 2001
- Vice President: Carlos Álvarez (1999–2000); None (2000–2001)
- Preceded by: Carlos Menem
- Succeeded by: Ramón Puerta (acting)

President of the National Committee of the Radical Civic Union
- In office 10 December 1997 – 10 December 1999
- Preceded by: Rodolfo Terragno
- Succeeded by: Raúl Alfonsín

1st Chief of Government of Buenos Aires
- In office 7 August 1996 – 10 December 1999
- Deputy: Enrique Olivera
- Preceded by: Jorge Domínguez (appointed intendant)
- Succeeded by: Enrique Olivera

National Senator
- In office 10 December 1993 – 7 August 1996
- Constituency: City of Buenos Aires
- In office 10 December 1983 – 10 December 1987
- Constituency: City of Buenos Aires
- In office 25 May 1973 – 24 March 1976
- Constituency: City of Buenos Aires

National Deputy
- In office 10 December 1991 – 10 December 1993
- Constituency: City of Buenos Aires

Personal details
- Born: 15 September 1937 Córdoba, Argentina
- Died: 9 July 2019 (aged 81) Loma Verde, Buenos Aires, Argentina
- Party: Radical Civic Union / Alliance
- Spouse: Inés Pertiné Urien (m. 1970)
- Children: 3, including Antonio
- Education: National University of Córdoba
- Fernando de la Rúa's voice Recorded c. 1999-2001

Fernando de la Rúa (Spanish pronunciation: [feɾˈnando ðe la ˈrua]; 15 September 1937 – 9 July 2019) was an Argentine politician who served as the president of Argentina from 1999 until his resignation in 2001. A member of the Radical Civic Union, he previously served as national senator for Buenos Aires across non-consecutive terms from 1973 to 1996, national deputy for Buenos Aires from 1991 to 1992, the first Chief of Government of Buenos Aires between 1996 and 1999, and president of the National Committee of the Radical Civic Union from 1997 to 1999.

De la Rúa was born in Córdoba, and entered politics after graduating with a degree in law. He was elected senator in 1973 and unsuccessfully ran for the office of vice president as Ricardo Balbín's running mate the same year. He was re-elected senator in 1983 and 1993, and as deputy in 1991. He unsuccessfully opposed the pact of Olivos between President Carlos Menem and party leader Raúl Alfonsín, which enabled the 1994 amendment of the Argentine Constitution and the re-election of Menem in 1995. He later became the first chief of government of Buenos Aires to be elected by popular vote, a change introduced by the amendment of the constitution. He expanded the Buenos Aires Underground, adding new stations to Line D, starting the expansion of Line B, and establishing Line H. He established Roberto Goyeneche Avenue and the city's first bicycle path.

De la Rúa was elected president in the 1999 general election, after running on the Alliance ticket, a political coalition of the UCR and the Frepaso. He was opposed by the Peronist unions, and his vice president, Carlos Álvarez, resigned after denouncing bribes in the Senate. The economic crisis that began during Menem's administration worsened, and by the end of 2001, it had led to a banking panic. The government established the Corralito to limit bank withdrawals. De la Rúa called a state of emergency during the December 2001 riots. Following his resignation on 20 December, the Argentine Congress appointed a new president. After leaving office, de la Rúa retired from politics and faced legal proceedings for much of the remainder of his life until his death in 2019.

== Early life ==
Fernando de la Rúa was the son of Eleonora Bruno and Antonio de la Rúa; he was born in the city of Córdoba and attended the local Military Lyceum before entering the National University of Córdoba, from which he graduated with a law degree at the age of 21. He married a Buenos Aires socialite, Inés Pertiné, in 1970; they had three children, including Antonio de la Rúa. Fernando de la Rúa became involved in politics at a young age; he entered public service in 1963 as an advisor to President Arturo Illia's minister Juan Palmero.

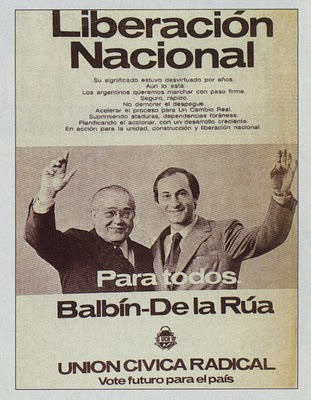
Advertisement for the September 1973 general elections, for the Ricardo Balbín-Fernando de la Rúa ticket

He was elected senator in the March 1973 general elections, defeating the Peronist Marcelo Sánchez Sorondo. He was the only politician from the Radical Civic Union (UCR) who could defeat the Peronist candidate in his administrative division. The elected president Héctor José Cámpora and his vice president resigned a few months later, leading to the call to new elections. Ricardo Balbín ran for president in the September general elections, with de la Rúa as his running mate for the post of vice president. The UCR was defeated by Juan Perón in a landslide. De la Rúa was removed from the Congress during the 1976 Argentine coup d'état. He left politics and worked as a lawyer for the firm Bunge y Born.

The National Reorganization Process ended in 1983. De la Rúa intended to run for president but lost in the primary elections of the UCR to Raúl Alfonsín, who was elected in the general election. De la Rúa ran for the post of senator instead, defeating the Peronist Carlos Ruckauf. He ran for re-election as senator in 1989 but, despite his electoral victory, the electoral college voted for the Peronist Eduardo Vaca. De la Rúa was elected deputy in 1991 and returned to the senate in 1993. President Carlos Menem, elected in 1989, wanted to amend the constitution to allow him to run for re-election in 1995, which was opposed by the UCR. Alfonsín signed the Pact of Olivos with Menem, negotiating terms to support the proposal. De la Rúa led the opposition to the pact within the UCR, but Alfonsín prevailed in the internal dispute. This damaged the relationship between the two leaders, but helped the party to retain a number of radicals who were against the pact. De la Rúa could not prevent the 1994 amendment of the Argentine Constitution. As a result, Menem was re-elected in 1995. The UCR finished third in the elections for the first time, being surpassed by the Frepaso, a new party composed by former Peronists.

== Mayor of Buenos Aires ==
The constitutional amendment gave autonomy to the city of Buenos Aires, allowing it to sanction local laws and elect its own mayor, who was previously appointed by the president of the nation. In 1996, de la Rúa was the first mayor elected in this manner, defeating the previous mayor Jorge Domínguez. During his term of office he created or reformulated several institutions to fit the new status of the city, as required by the national constitution and the recently approved Constitution of Buenos Aires.

De la Rúa worked on the expansion of the Buenos Aires Underground. The first stations of the extended Line D, Olleros and José Hernández, were opened in 1997, Juramento was opened in 1999, and Congreso de Tucumán in 2000. He also started the works to extend the Line B. Carlos Menem started to transfer the control and financing of the underground system to the city, but the 2001 economic crisis halted the process.

The former mayor Domínguez intended to expand the Pan-American Highway into Saavedra, but the project met widespread opposition. De la Rúa reformulated the project and built an avenue instead of a highway, which was accepted. The avenue was named Roberto Goyeneche. He also restarted a project to build the Cámpora Highway linking Dellepiane Avenue with the Riachuelo, and established the first non-recreational bikeway in Buenos Aires at Avenida del Libertador.

== Presidential elections ==
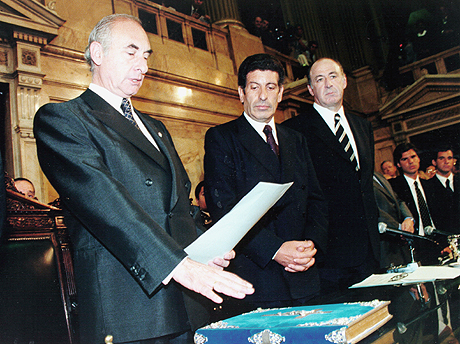
Fernando de la Rúa takes the oath of office next to his vice-president Carlos Álvarez.

The Pact of Olivos diminished the electoral strength of the UCR, leading to the rise of the Frepaso. Both parties united in a political coalition, the Alliance, which defeated the PJ in the 1997 midterm elections. It was the PJ's first national defeat since 1985. The parties held open primary elections for the 1999 presidential elections. De la Rúa stood for the UCR; the whole party, including Alfonsín, supported him. The Frepaso candidate was Graciela Fernández Meijide, who had defeated Peronism in the populous Buenos Aires province. De la Rúa won the primary elections by a wide margin. In the primaries, de la Rúa was voted for by more people than those who voted for the UCR in 1995. Despite his victory, Alfonsín was still the president of the UCR. They disagreed on the vice president for de la Rúa's ticket; he thought that it should be Meijide because she took part in the primary elections and came from a different district than him. Alfonsín preferred the popular Carlos Álvarez, leader of the Frepaso, saying he could attract more voters and had more political expertise. It was also a result of the internal politics of the Alliance: except for Meijide, the Frepaso did not have a political figure who could run with high prospects for winning the post of Governor of the Buenos Aires province. Had she run for vice president, Frepaso would have had to resign that candidacy to a radical candidate.

Carlos Menem dismissed de la Rúa as a "boring" candidate. De la Rúa exploited that description in television advertisements, embracing it and setting a comparison with the glitzy style of Menem and the perceived political corruption of his administration. He also compared himself with the Peronist candidate Eduardo Duhalde. He promised to solve the economic crisis with fiscal austerity and higher tax controls, hoping it would lower interest rates, bring more foreign investments, and reduce unemployment. He also promised to keep the convertibility plan established by Menem that pegged the Argentine peso one-to-one with the United States dollar.

The 1999 presidential election was held on 24 October. De la Rúa defeated Duhalde by 48.4% to 38.3%, well ahead of the threshold to avoid a second round run-off election. Domingo Cavallo, Menem's former minister of economy, finished the race in third place. De la Rúa was inaugurated President of Argentina on 10 December 1999. He took office with a favorability rating of 75%. Unlike Menem, whose initial cabinet was composed of trusted friends, de la Rúa's cabinet included five people with international degrees and four economists.

== Presidency ==
=== Domestic policy ===
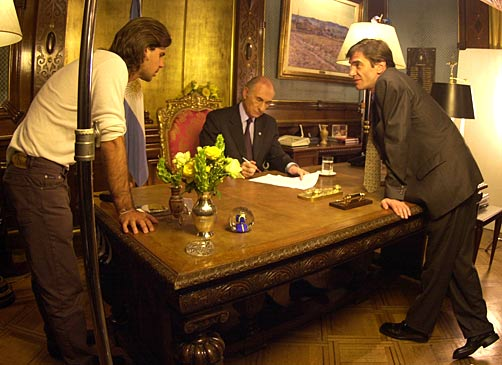
De la Rúa prepares a speech after the resignation of his vice president, Carlos Álvarez. He is with his son Antonio de la Rúa and the secretary Darío Lopérfido.

In the first days of his presidency, de la Rúa sent a bill to the Congress to request a federal intervention in the province of Corrientes. The province had a high level of debt, and organizations of piqueteros blocked roads to make demonstrations. There were two interim governors disputing power. The bill was immediately approved. The intervenor selected for the task was Ramón Mestre.

The Peronist unions opposed de la Rúa and held seven general strikes against him. He sent a bill known as the labour flexibility law to deregulate labor conditions, attempting to reduce the political influence of unions, to the Congress. This project was opposed by the PJ and was changed from the original draft. It was finally approved but Álvarez said several legislators were bribed to support the bill. Álvarez asked for the removal of the labor minister Alberto Flamarique, but de la Rúa instead promoted him to be his personal secretary. Álvarez resigned the following day and the political scandal divided the coalition. Several deputies who initially supported de la Rúa switched to the opposition. Alfonsín tried to prevent a breakup of the UCR. Some months later, it was proposed that Álvarez return to the de la Rúa government as the Chief of the Cabinet of Ministers. Álvarez initially supported the idea but de la Rúa opposed it. Cavallo was also proposed for the office before he was appointed Minister of Economy. De la Rúa intended to include the Frepaso in the new cabinet but to exclude Álvarez himself because he still resented the latter's resignation. The negotiations failed and the new cabinet included no Frepaso politicians, but the Alliance was still working as a coalition in the Congress. It also included several radical politicians from Alfonsín's internal faction. The new Chief of Cabinet was Chrystian Colombo, who mediated between Alfonsín and the president.

The PJ won the 2001 midterm election by 40% to 24%, giving it a majority in both chambers of the Congress. However, the abstention rate and several forms of protest votes combined reached 41%, the highest in Argentine history, as a consequence of the popular discontent with the two main parties. Even the few candidates of the Alliance who won at their districts, such as the radical Rodolfo Terragno in Buenos Aires, did so with political platforms against de la Rúa's administration.

=== Foreign policy ===
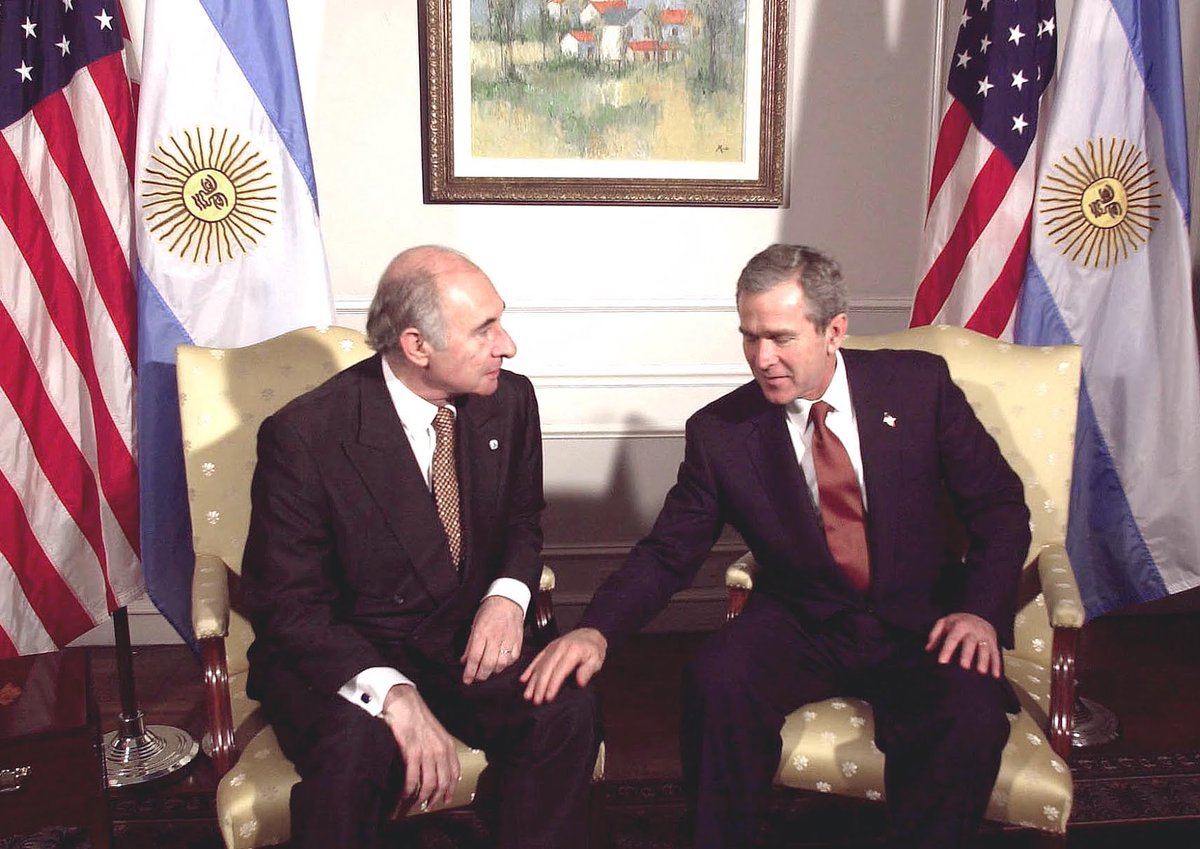
De la Rúa and US president George W. Bush in the White House in April 2001.

The first year of de la Rúa's presidency coincided with the last year of Bill Clinton's presidency of the United States. Ricardo López Murphy, Minister of Defense at the time, met William Cohen, U.S. Secretary of Defense, in a summit of ministers that took place in Brazil in 2000. Both countries agreed to share classified information and to hold joint operations against terrorism.

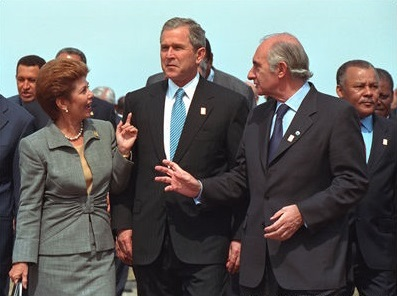
De la Rúa, Mireya Moscoso and US president George W. Bush during the 3rd Summit of the Americas.

George W. Bush took office as President of the United States in January 2001, and changed American policy towards countries in financial crises. His Treasury Secretary, Paul H. O'Neill, a critic of financial aid, said, "We're working to find a way to create a sustainable Argentina, not just one that continues to consume the money of the plumbers and carpenters in the United States who make $50,000 a year and wonder what in the world we're doing with their money". The September 11 attacks occurred a few months later, and the U.S. focused its foreign policy on the war on terror against countries suspected of harboring terrorist organizations. As a result, the U.S. gave no further financial aid to Argentina. This policy was confirmed after an interview of Bush with the Brazilian president, Fernando Henrique Cardoso, who confirmed Brazil would not be affected by the Argentine crisis.

Although Argentina maintained neutrality as for the conflict itself in Afghanistan to topple the Taliban rule, defense minister Horacio Jaunarena ordered the Argentine Air Force to prepare to deploy to Afghanistan under UN humanitarian mission "after the war was over" with military personnel returning from Kosovo. The mission never materialized as the war extended in time beyond de la Rúa's term.

=== Economic policy ===
The minister of economy Ricardo López Murphy announces a large fiscal austerity plan. He resigned a short time later, because of the protests caused by it.

De la Rúa's first Minister of Economy was the progressive José Luis Machinea, who was proposed by Alfonsín and Álvarez. Menem had left a deficit of 5 Gross Domestic Product (GDP) points that Machinea tried to compensate with higher taxes to people with the highest incomes, and a reduction of the highest retirement pensions. The deficit was reduced but the crisis continued. The scandal over the labor law and the resignation of Álvarez increased the country's risk, and made Argentina's access to international credit more difficult. The government negotiated a US$38 billion International Monetary Fund (IMF) line of credit to prevent a default and allow the economy to grow again. Machinea also proposed appointing former minister Domingo Cavallo as the new President of the Central Bank of Argentina. However, Machinea was unable to achieve the levels of austerity negotiated with the IMF and resigned a few days later. The Minister of Defense Ricardo López Murphy became the new Minister of Economy. During the election campaign, de la Rúa had promised not to appoint him to that ministry, but with the ongoing crisis he did not want to risk problems caused by a temporary lack of minister. López Murphy announced a stricter austerity plan, with reduction to the health and education budgets. His plan was rejected by street demonstrations and the Frepaso, so de la Rúa declined it. Murphy resigned after being minister for 16 days.

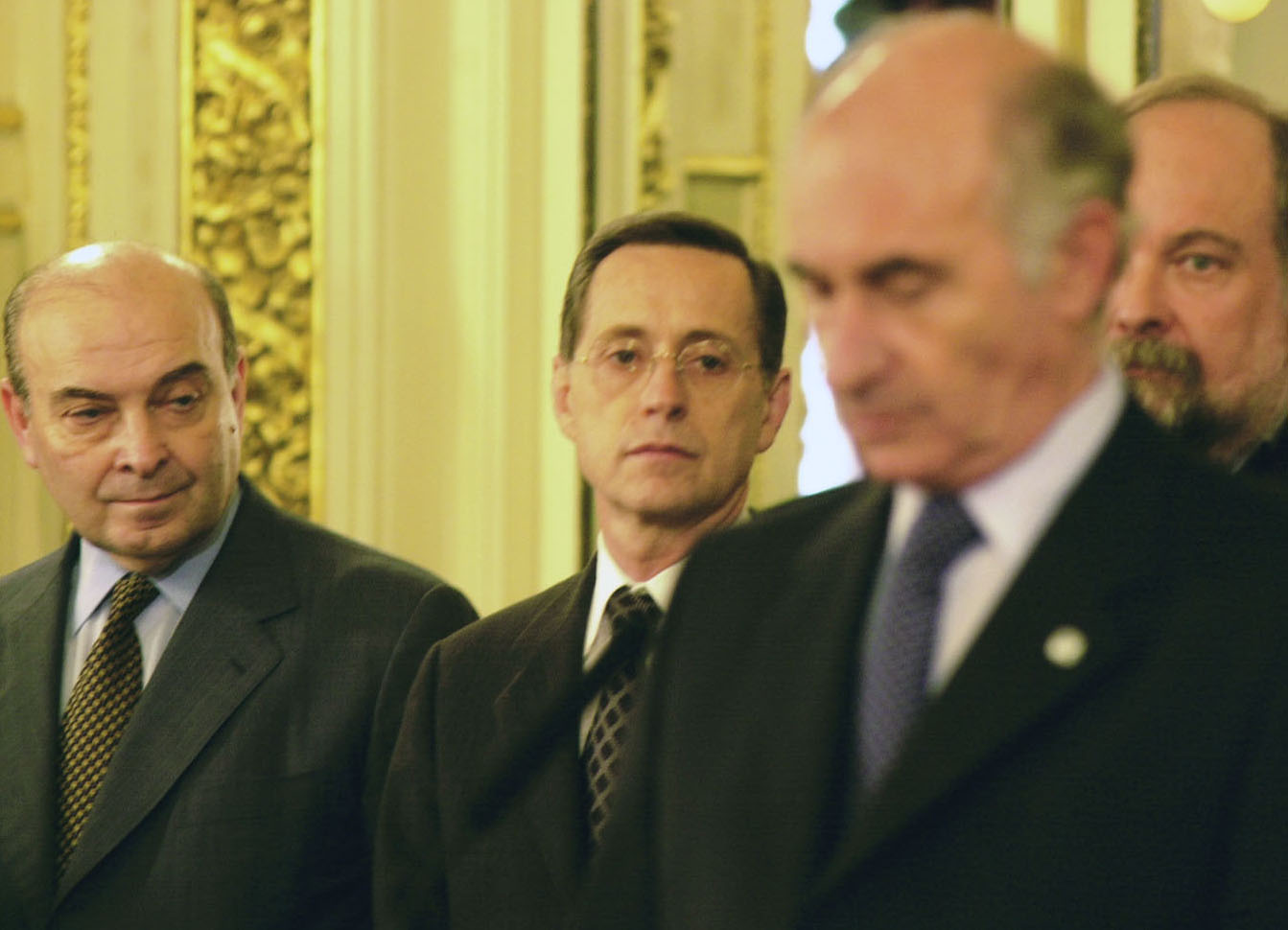
De la Rúa with Domingo Cavallo in March 2001.

De la Rúa appointed Cavallo, who had served under Menem and had established the convertibility plan. He was supported by the PJ, Carlos Álvarez, and the financial groups, but he was rejected by the rest of the UCR. The government announced it would retain the convertibility plan and that there would be no devaluation or sovereign default. Cavallo proposed several bills; de la Rúa sent them to the Congress and they were approved. The "superpowers law" authorized the chief of government to modify the national budget without the intervention of the Congress. There was a new tax on bank operations and more products attracted value-added tax. The wages of national customs workers were increased and some industries benefited from tax exemptions. The Megacanje was a negotiation to delay the payment of foreign debt in exchange for higher interest rates. However, internal debt was still a problem because the provinces, especially Buenos Aires, were nearing default. This led to conflicts between Cavallo and the provincial governors. Congress approved a bill for a "Zero deficit" policy to prevent further increases of debt and to work only with money from tax revenue. There was a banking panic in November; the government reacted by introducing the "corralito", which prevented people from withdrawing cash from banks. It was initially a temporary measure. The IMF refused to send the monthly payment for the line of credit approved at the beginning of the year because the government had not stuck to the "zero deficit" policy.

=== Riots and resignation ===
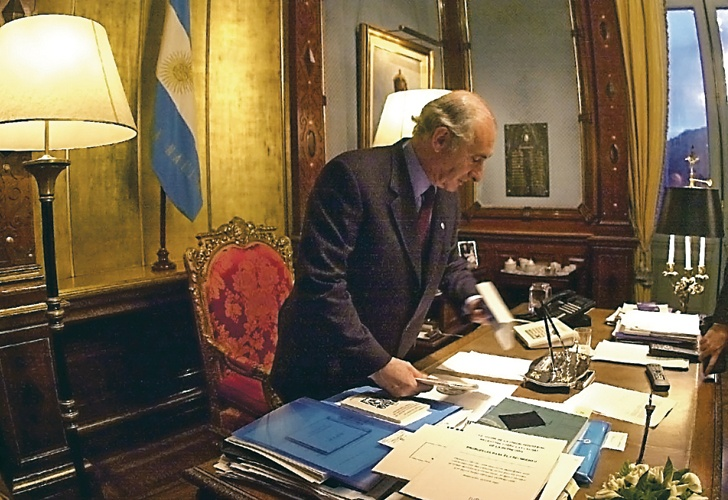
De la Rúa collects his personal belongings after his resignation, 21 December 2001

The crisis worsened and by 19 December 2001, riots and looting broke out at several points in the country. De la Rúa announced in a cadena nacional (national network broadcast) that he had established a state of emergency. The riots continued; his speech was followed by increased protests, the cacerolazos, which caused 27 deaths and thousands of injuries. Cavallo resigned at midnight the same day, and the rest of the cabinet followed suit.

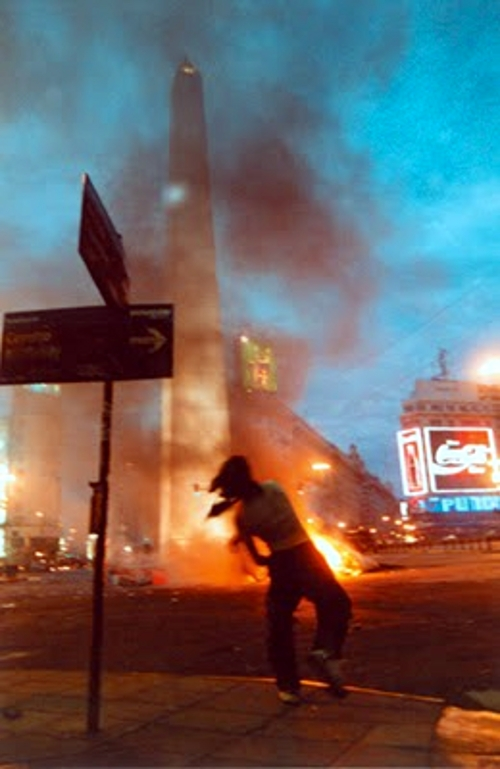
Obelisco protests, December 2001.

There was increased looting on 20 December, both in Buenos Aires and the Conurbano. The cacerolazos continued; large groups of people started demonstrations calling for the government's resignation. The unions—first the CTA and then the CGT—began general strikes against the state of emergency. Most of the UCR withdrew their support for de la Rúa, so he asked the PJ to create a government coalition. The PJ refused, and de la Rúa resigned from government. His last administrative action was to lift the state of emergency. He gave his resignation to Congress on 20 December 2001 and left the Casa Rosada by helicopter as protesters blocked streets. He had presided for two years, half of his allotted term of office.

Because Vice President Carlos Álvarez had already resigned, the Congress convened to appoint a new president. Adolfo Rodríguez Saá, governor of San Luis Province, was in office for two months while calling for new presidential elections. Renewed demonstrations forced him to resign as well, and Eduardo Duhalde was appointed as the new president. He was able to complete de la Rúa's term of office.

== Later life and death ==
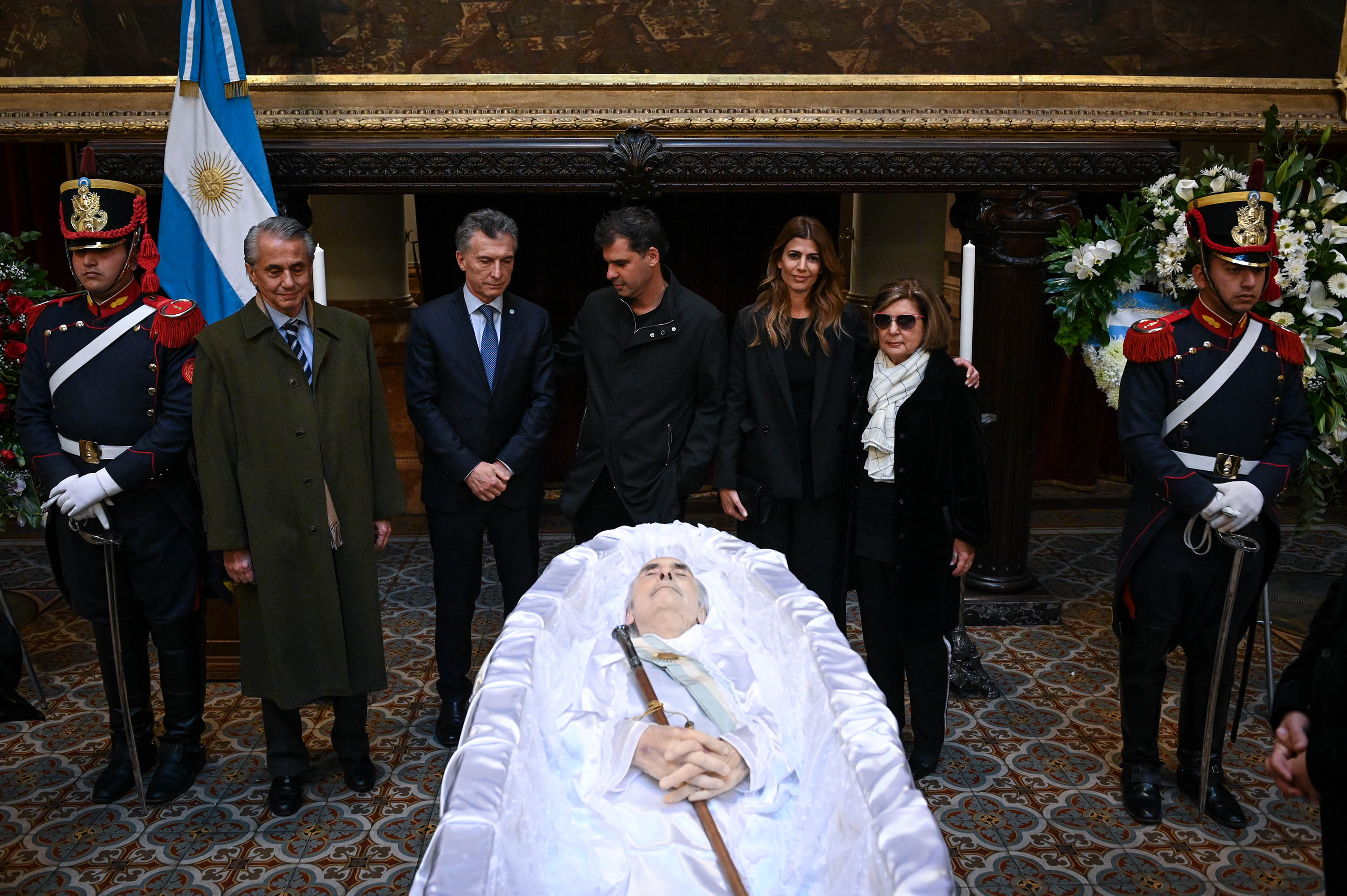
President Mauricio Macri at the state funeral of Fernando de la Rúa.

De la Rúa retired from political life after his resignation. The scandal over the labor flexibility law was renewed in 2003 when a former Senate worker, Mario Pontaquarto, claimed to be a witness of the case who delivered $5,000,000 to the legislators. De la Rúa was indicted alongside seven politicians from both the UCR and the PJ. In 2013, they were all cleared of charges by a unanimous resolution, and Pontaquarto was removed from the witness protection program.

De la Rúa was also indicted for the police repression which took place during the crisis; he was tried by judge Claudio Bonadio, who in 2009 declared him innocent. The Supreme Court overturned Bonadio's ruling and ordered him to further investigate the matter. De la Rúa and Cavallo were indicted for illegally benefiting the banks that took part in the Megacanje. They were declared innocent on 6 October 2014.

He died of heart failure on 9 July 2019 at age 81. He received a state funeral in Congress before a private burial the following day.

== Public image ==
De la Rúa started to work in politics from a very young age. He was nicknamed "Chupete" (Spanish: "Pacifier") because of this; the nickname was still employed when he grew up. During Carlos Menem's administration he was perceived as a serious and formal politician, in stark contrast with Menem's style. De la Rúa took advantage of this perception during the electoral campaign of 1999. When he became president and the economic crisis worsened, he was perceived as a weak and tired man who was unable to react to the crisis. He was perceived as a man without leadership skills who could not make use of his presidential authority. De la Rúa thought that the parody of him by the television comedian Freddy Villarreal helped to establish that image. He sought to change his image by appearing on the television comedy show El show de Videomatch, but his appearance on the program backfired. He confused the names of the show and that of the host Marcelo Tinelli's wife. After de la Rúa's participation ended, Tinelli began to close the program; de la Rúa could be seen seeking an exit from the set in the background. The aforementioned popular image of De la Rúa was further magnified when he was hospitalized for peripheral artery disease caused by high blood cholesterol. Although it is a standard, simple medical intervention, the medic told the press de la Rúa suffered from arteriosclerosis, which is usually linked with a lack of speed and reflexes.

== Honours ==
=== National honours ===
- Collar of the Order of the Liberator General San Martín
- Collar of the Order of May

=== International honours ===
Ribbon	Distinction	Country	Date	Reference
	Grand Cross of the Order of the Sun of Peru	Peru	31 May 1984	
	Grand Cross of the National Order of Merit	Paraguay	14 May 2000	
	Collar of the Order of Merit	Chile	18 May 2000	
	Grand Collar of the Order of Boyacá	Colombia	12 October 2000	
	Knight of the Collar of the Order of Isabella the Catholic	Spain	20 October 2000	
	Knight Grand Cross with Collar of the Order of Merit of the Italian Republic	Italy	7 March 2001	
	Grand Cross of the Order of the White Double Cross	Slovakia	29 June 2001	
	Grand Collar of the Order of Prince Henry	Portugal	14 November 2001	
	Key of Honor of the City of Lisbon	Portugal	15 November 2001	

== Bibliography ==
- Reato, Ceferino (2015). Doce noches [Twelve nights] (in Spanish). Argentina: Sudamericana. ISBN 978-950-07-5203-9.
- Romero, Luis Alberto (2001). Breve historia contemporánea de la Argentina. Argentina: Fondo de cultura económica. ISBN 978-950-557-393-6.
- Smith, Wayne (1983). Juan Peron and the Reshaping of Argentina. United States: University of Pittsburgh Press. ISBN 0-8229-3464-7.

Political offices
Preceded by Jorge Domínguez as Mayor	Chief of Government of Buenos Aires; 1996–1999	Succeeded by Enrique Olivera
Preceded by Carlos Menem	President of Argentina; 1999–2001	Succeeded by Adolfo Rodríguez Saá
