= Carlos Ruckauf =

Argentine politician

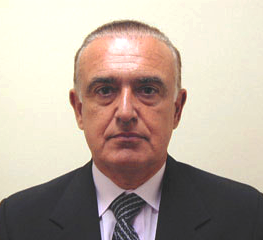

National Deputy
- In office 10 December 2003 – 9 December 2007
- Constituency: Buenos Aires
- In office 10 December 1991 – 24 August 1993
- In office 10 December 1987 – 16 August 1989
- Succeeded by: Jorge Domínguez

Minister of Foreign Affairs of Argentina
- In office January 2, 2002 – May 25, 2003
- President: Eduardo Duhalde
- Preceded by: José María Vernet
- Succeeded by: Rafael Bielsa

Governor of Buenos Aires Province
- In office December 10, 1999 – January 2, 2002
- Vice Governor: Felipe Solá
- Preceded by: Eduardo Duhalde
- Succeeded by: Felipe Solá

31st Vice President of Argentina
- In office July 8, 1995 – December 10, 1999
- President: Carlos Saúl Menem
- Preceded by: Eduardo Duhalde
- Succeeded by: Carlos Álvarez

Minister of the Interior
- In office 1 March 1993 – 15 January 1995
- President: Carlos Saúl Menem
- Preceded by: Gustavo Béliz
- Succeeded by: Carlos Corach

Ambassador of Argentina to Italy
- In office 1989–1991
- President: Carlos Saúl Menem
- Preceded by: Alfredo Allende
- Succeeded by: Carlos Keller Sarmiento

Minister of Labor
- In office 11 August 1975 – 3 February 1976
- President: Isabel Perón
- Preceded by: Cecilio Conditi
- Succeeded by: Miguel Unamuno

Personal details
- Born: July 10, 1944 (age 81) Ramos Mejía
- Party: Justicialist Party

Carlos Federico Ruckauf (Spanish pronunciation: [ˈkaɾlos ruˈkawf]; born July 10, 1944) is an Argentine Peronist politician and a member of the Justicialist Party. He served as minister of foreign affairs from January 2002 to March 2003. Earlier, he was vice president of Argentina from 1995 to 1999 under President Carlos Menem, and also served as minister of the interior during Menem’s first term. After the return of democratic rule in Argentina, Ruckauf was elected twice to the National Assembly. In his early career, he was appointed a labor court judge, and later became minister of labor in July 1974.

== Early life and education ==
Ruckauf was born in the western Buenos Aires suburb of Ramos Mejía. His parents separated when he was seven, and he lived in Mar del Plata, Salta, and Buenos Aires during the remainder of his childhood.

Ruckauf enrolled at the University of Buenos Aires, and earned a juris doctor in 1967. He was hired as a fingerprint analyst by an insurance company, and was elected adjunct secretary of the Insurance Employees' Union, a member union of the CGT, in 1969. He married María Isabel Zapatero, and they had three children.

== Political career ==
Through associations at CGT, Ruckauf became a close ally of Lorenzo Miguel, leader of the Steelworkers' Union. With the return of Peronists to power in 1973, he was appointed to the bench as a labor court judge.

Following a cabinet reshuffle after the Rodrigazo crisis, Miguel recommended Ruckauf to President Isabel Perón for the post of minister of labor in July 1974, after she assumed office following the death of Juan Perón. During his tenure, Ruckauf signed decree 261/75 on October 6, 1974, which granted amnesty to the armed forces for actions taken to “annihilate subversives.” The decree is seen as an early step in the state’s Dirty War against political dissidents. In 1975, Ruckauf was later accused of involvement in the disappearance of 14 Mercedes-Benz workers.[1] He remained in office until the military coup in March 1976.

Unlike many others in Peron's government, he escaped arrest, allegedly with the support of Admiral Eduardo Massera, through a Federal Police official, Ramón Ramírez.

== Post-1983 political career ==
Following the restoration of democratic rule in 1983, Carlos Ruckauf was elected as president of the Buenos Aires City chapter of the Justicialist Party.

Elected to the Argentine Chamber of Deputies in 1987, he was designated Ambassador plenipotentiary of Argentina in Italy, Malta and the Food and Agriculture Organization by the newly-elected president Carlos Saúl Menem in 1989, serving as ambassador until 1991.

He was elected to Congress again in 1991 and was appointed minister of the interior by President Menem on March 1, 1993. Relatives of the victims of the 1994 AMIA bombing later questioned his role during the crisis. He was nominated as Menem's running-mate for the 1995 reelection campaign, and served as vice-president of Argentina from 1995 to 1999.

After being elected governor of Buenos Aires Province in 1999, he issued provincial Patacón bonds in August 2001 to address the shortage of Argentine pesos during the peak of the 2001 economic crisis. The new president appointed by a crisis meeting of Congress, Eduardo Duhalde, named Ruckauf as Foreign Minister on January 2, 2002. He served in that position until May 25, 2003, when the Duhalde government left office.

Later in 2003, Ruckauf was elected to the Argentine Chamber of Deputies representing Buenos Aires Province. He joined the center-right Federal Peronism caucus, which opposed the government of Néstor Kirchner, and remained in Congress until 2007.

Political offices
Preceded by Eduardo Duhalde	Vice President of Argentina; 1995 - 1999	Succeeded by Carlos Álvarez
Preceded by Eduardo Duhalde	Governor of Buenos Aires Province; 1999–2002	Succeeded by Felipe Solá
