= List of ambassadors of Argentina to China =

Coordinates: 39.944°N 116.455898°E

Ambassador of Argentina to China Embassy of Argentina, Beijing
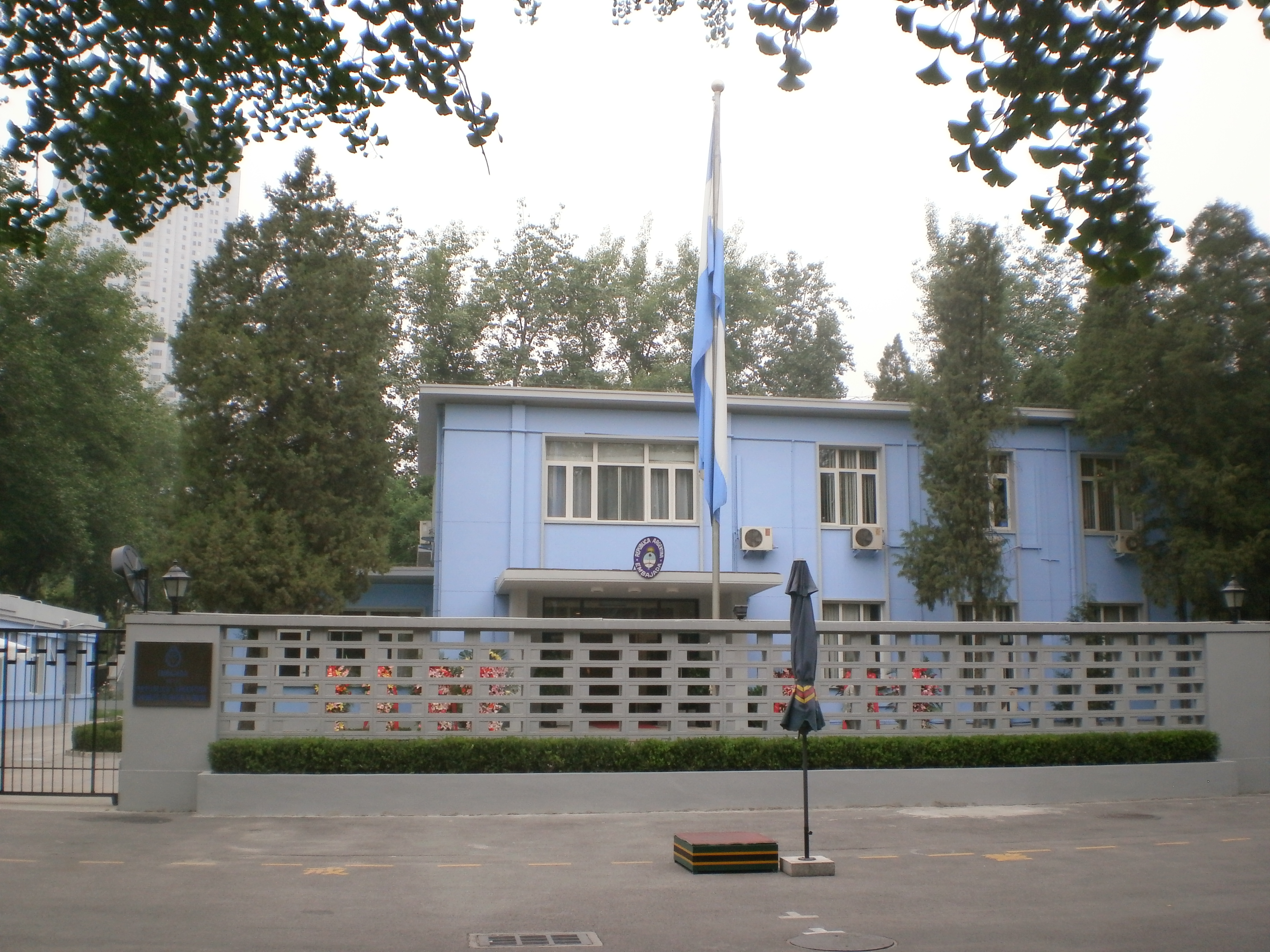
- Inaugural holder: José Arce
- Formation: December 4, 1945

The Argentine ambassador in Beijing is the official representative of the Government in Buenos Aires to the Government of the People's Republic of China and to the government in Ulaanbaatar (Mongolia).

== List of representatives ==
Diplomatic agrément/Diplomatic accreditation	Ambassador	Observations	President of Argentina	Premier of the Republic of China	Term end
January 1, 1945		The Governments in Chongqing and Buenos Aires established diplomatic relations.	Edelmiro Julián Farrell	Chiang Kai-shek	
December 4, 1945	José Arce	Ambassador in Chongqing Chiang Kai-shek met him at Chungking on November 7, 1945, the day when I presented the credentials of the Argentine Ambassador to China.	Edelmiro Julián Farrell	Chiang Kai-shek	
August 1, 1962	Adolfo Alfredo Bolini	Argentine Ambassador to Japan with residence in Tokyo.	José María Guido	Chen Cheng	
May 3, 1963	Carlos Echagüe	Carlos Mugica's homonym was the first permanent Argentine ambassador to the Republic of China.	Arturo Umberto Illia	Chen Cheng	

Diplomatic agrément/Diplomatic accreditation	Ambassador	Observations	President of Argentina	Premier of the People's Republic of China	Term end
February 19, 1972		The governments in Beijing and Buenos Aires established diplomatic relations.	Alejandro Agustín Lanusse	Zhou Enlai	
January 8, 1973	Eduardo Bradley	son of Eduardo Bradley the first Argentine ambassador to the People's Republic of China, handed the credentials to Zhu De, chairman of the Standing Committee of the National People's Congress of China,	Héctor José Cámpora	Zhou Enlai	
December 6, 1975	Juan Carlos Katzenstein	(* August 9, 1925 in Buenos Aires) Lawyer. He entered the Foreign Service of the Nation in December 1955, as Secretary and Second Class Consul at the Embassy to the Holy See.	Isabel Perón	Zhou Enlai	February 21, 1978
February 21, 1978	Federico del Solar Dorrego		Jorge Rafael Videla	Hua Guofeng	July 23, 1979
July 23, 1979	Paulino Daniel Armando Musacchio		Jorge Rafael Videla	Hua Guofeng	February 1, 1981
February 1, 1981	Hector Alberto Subiza		Roberto Eduardo Viola	Zhao Ziyang	
September 17, 1986	Arturo Enrique Ossorio Arana		Raúl Alfonsín	Zhao Ziyang	
May 9, 1991	Carlos Lucas Blanco		Carlos Menem	Li Peng	
September 23, 1997	Raúl Estrada Oyuela		Carlos Menem	Li Peng	
February 11, 1998	Carlos Federico Barttfeld	(* 1955)	Carlos Menem	Zhu Rongji	
November 23, 2001	Juan Carlos Morelli	(* October 19, 1955)	Ramón Puerta	Zhu Rongji	
August 19, 2008	César Mayoral		Cristina Fernández de Kirchner	Wen Jiabao	
April 29, 2011	Gustavo Martino	Was consul general in Chicago	Cristina Fernández de Kirchner	Wen Jiabao	May 17, 2016
May 17, 2016	Diego Ramiro Guelar		Mauricio Macri	Li Keqiang	2020
July 17, 2020	Luis María Kreckler	Removed from position before presentation of letter of credence	Alberto Fernández	Li Keqiang	2021
April 14, 2021	Sabino Vaca Narvaja		Alberto Fernández	Li Keqiang	2023
December 23, 2023	Marcelo Suárez Salvia		Javier Milei	Li Qiang	

- Argentina–China relations
