= Donald Pearlman =

American lawyer and oil industry lobbyist (1935–2005)

- Pearlman in Berlin, 1995
- Born: December 8, 1935; Portland, Oregon, U.S.
- Died: August 13, 2005 (aged 69); Washington, D.C., U.S.
- Education: Harvard University (BA); Yale Law School (JD)
- Known for: Lobbying career that was later portrayed in the 2024 play Kyoto
- Political party: Republican
- Spouse: Shirley Block Pearlman
- Children: 2

Donald H. Pearlman (December 8, 1935 – August 13, 2005) was an American lawyer and oil industry lobbyist. He is primarily known for his opposition to the scientific consensus on climate change and his efforts to stall or prevent the adoption of the Kyoto Protocol. His lobbying efforts were dramatized in the 2024 play Kyoto.

== Biography ==
Donald H. Pearlman was born in Portland, Oregon, on December 8, 1935. He attended Grant High School in Portland, and in 1957 he graduated cum laude from Harvard University with a degree in economics. In 1960 he received a Juris Doctor degree from Yale Law School and joined the Oregon State Bar. He worked as a clerk for Chief Judge John R. Ross in Nevada from 1960 to 1962, before becoming a senior partner at Portland-based law firm Keane, Harper, Pearlman & Copeland, where he worked from 1962 until 1982.

He was active in the Republican Party during college and worked on the unsuccessful congressional campaign of former partner Diarmuid F. O'Scannlain in 1976. In 1982, Pearlman moved to Washington, D.C. to become an executive assistant to the secretary of energy (1982–85) and the secretary of the interior (1985–89) while these posts were held by Donald P. Hodel, who was his classmate in high school and his roommate at college. During this time he was a member of the Energy, Environment and Natural Resources Working Group of the Domestic Policy Council. In 1988, he received an Honor Award for Outstanding Service from the Department of the Interior. After the presidency of Ronald Reagan was over, Pearlman began working for the Washington, D.C.-based law firm Patton Boggs in 1990, where he established himself as an expert in matters concerning global climate change. In 1991 he spoke before the Royal Society of London as part of a debate on global warming.

=== Climate lobbying ===
In April 1995, during the COP 1 summit in Berlin, the German magazine Der Spiegel published an exposé on Pearlman which detailed his activity as a lobbyist for the fossil fuel industry during climate negotiations. In order to gain access to UN negotiations, Pearlman had created a non-governmental organization called "The Climate Council", with himself as its nominal "expert". Pearlman's tactics were intended to prolong and frustrate negotiations as much as possible, which included calling into question the rules of procedure, and finding formal errors which caused lengthy delays. He was described by Greenpeace director Jeremy Leggett as being extremely successful at blockading progress. After Pearlman was dubbed a "high priest of the carbon club" in Der Spiegel, young Greenpeace volunteers began following him from meeting to meeting dressed as monks.

Climate scientist Joseph Alcamo said that while climate researchers only wrote down undisputed statements in their report prior to COP1, Pearlman's team questioned every line and engaged in "endless hair-splitting". Due to Pearlman's influence, Alcamo consequently said that the final report no longer reflected the majority scientific opinion. Pearlman insisted that there was no scientific consensus and that the United Nations Intergovernmental Panel on Climate Change (IPCC) was divided on the issue. At a conference in New York in February 1995, Pearlman's intrusions were such that UN official Jacob Swager ordered all lobbyists to leave the room, but Pearlman resisted and only left after being warned by Swager several times. Pearlman later denied that such a scene had ever occurred. Pearlman's blatant interference, including the presence of runners who would take his hand-written notes directly to delegates, resulted in all NGOs being banned from the floor of UN negotiations.

In November 1995, at a plenary meeting in Madrid ahead of the IPCC Second Assessment Report, delegates agreed to the conclusion that there is a "discernable human impact on the global climate". After this point, Pearlman's strategy changed in favor of attacking both the science and the scientists themselves. Climate scientist Ben Santer later recalled that Pearlman had confronted him in Washington, D.C. on May 21, 1996, where Pearlman "screamed" at him for what he claimed were unauthorized changes to the chapter of the report that Santer had been responsible for. In reality, the IPCC had authorized these changes, and Santer said that Pearlman was well aware of this because he was present in Madrid when these changes were discussed. Pearlman also worked with John Shlaes, the executive director of the lobbyist group known as the Global Climate Coalition, and the two submitted a letter co-signed by 6 industrialists which claimed that a mistake in a press release proved that some scientists were "trying to use the IPCC to persuade policymakers and the public of their personal views concerning climate change science and policy issues". Pearlman and Shlaes also attacked the IPCC for what they claimed was ill-defined terminology and for supposed violations of procedural rules.

Pearlman recognised from the beginning that the Kuwaiti and Saudi delegations would more reliably take the side of the oil industry than would the United States, and these countries served as proxies for the fossil fuel industry to exert its influence over climate negotiations. Founder and director of the Climate Investigations Center, Kert Davies, said "He was using the Saudis as the doer on the floor of the plenary" because "They were kind of willing puppets for a guy who knew how to screw things up at the COPs". Pearlman was observed handing precise tactical instructions to the delegations of Arab states, directing them to have certain paragraphs deleted or to suggest alternative wording if they were unable to have it removed, and Kuwaiti delegates submitted suggestions for changes which were written in Pearlman's handwriting. Pearlman was on first name terms with the Kuwaiti delegate, Atif Al-Juwaili, and he was retained by OPEC as an advisor.

In a 2001 memo by the Bureau of Oceans and International Environmental and Scientific Affairs of the U.S. State Department, Pearlman's Climate Council was described as "one of the most ardent opponents of the Protocol, and on behalf of its coal and other industry members, has actively worked against most U.S. government efforts to address climate change." The memo also said that the Climate Council "prefers to keep a low profile", and that it "is dedicated to informing policy on domestic and international climate change". The 1995 article in Der Spiegel said that Pearlman perceived himself as a defender of the American way of life, and that since America's wealth was built on the oil industry, it was ultimately against the interests of the United States to set limits on fossil fuel usage. Pearlman was present at almost every IPCC meeting until his death in 2005.

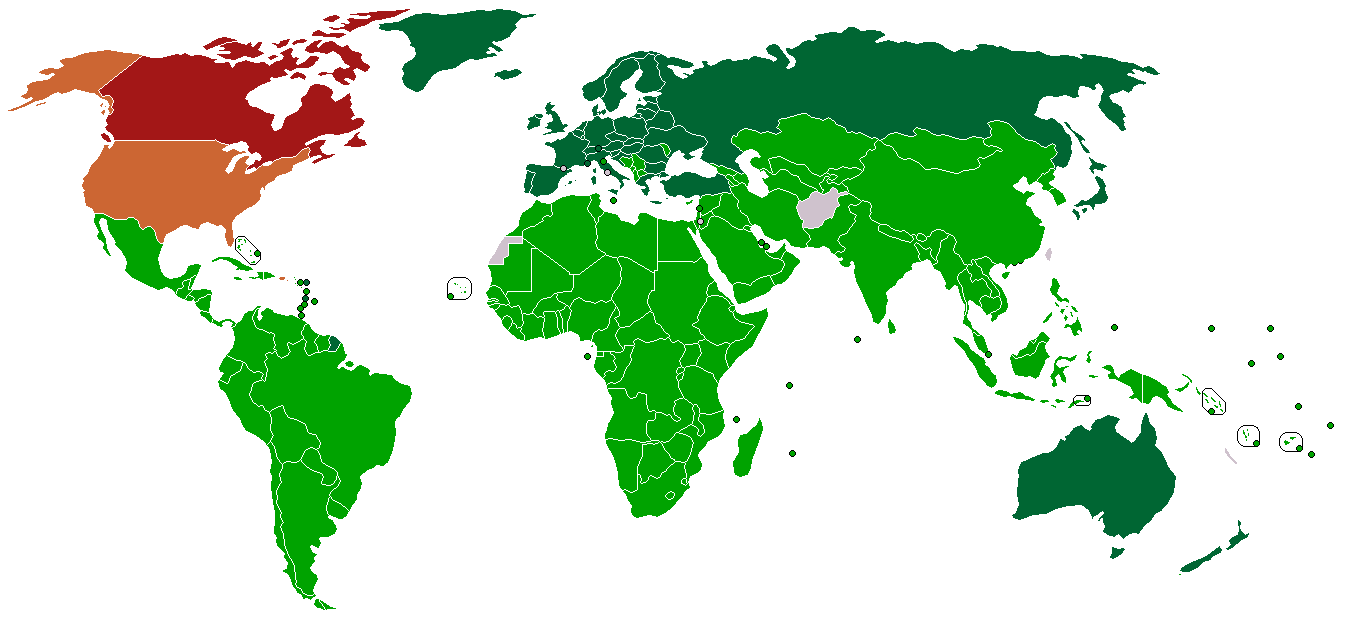
Kyoto Protocol participation by country in 2012 (Participating parties in dark and light green, parties that withdrew in red, and parties that never ratified in orange)

=== Death and legacy ===
Donald Pearlman died from complications arising out of lung cancer at Washington Hospital Center on August 13, 2005, aged 69. He was survived by his wife of 45 years, Shirley Block Pearlman, his son Bradley Pearlman, his daughter Stephanie Mennitt, 6 grandchildren, and his brother Gary.

In 2024, the events leading up to the adoption of the Kyoto Protocol were dramatized in the play Kyoto written by Joe Murphy and Joe Robertson, in which Pearlman (played by Stephen Kunken) serves as both narrator and a central character.
