= Alcamo (disambiguation) =

Alcamo is a city in Italy.

Alcamo may also refer to:

- Alcamo Marina
- Alcamo wine
- Joseph Alcamo
