= Raúl Estrada-Oyuela =

Argentinian diplomat

- Born: 1938 (age 87–88); Buenos Aires, Argentina
- Education: National University of Buenos Aires
- Known for: Presiding over negotiations for the Kyoto Protocol
- Spouse: Leticia Vigil Zavala
- Children: 8

Argentinian Ambassador to China
- In office October 1994 – December 1997

Raúl A. Estrada-Oyuela (Note: Also commonly known as Raul Estrada) is an Argentinian lawyer and diplomat. He was the Argentinian ambassador to China from 1994 to 1997, and has also served in the embassies of Argentina to the United States, Austria, Brazil and Chile. He is mostly known for chairing United Nations negotiations for the Kyoto Protocol.

== Early life and education ==
Raúl A. Estrada-Oyuela was born in Buenos Aires in 1938. He graduated from the National University of Buenos Aires with a degree in law.

== Career ==
He was a political journalist and parliamentarian from 1957 until 1966, when he entered the Argentine foreign service. He served as Argentine delegate to several United Nations General Assemblies beginning in 1968. He has served in Washington, D.C., Vienna, Brasília, and Santiago, and as Argentina's Ambassador to China and Mongolia from October 1994 to December 1997. He served as special representative for environmental affairs in the Argentine Foreign Ministry from 2000 until he was removed in September 2007 after he criticised environment secretary Romina Picolotti by declaring that "Argentina has no environmental policy". He retired from active service in November 2008.

He has been a member of the Argentine Academy of Environmental Sciences since 2005, serving as president from 2007 to 2011, and again from 2015. He has also been a member of the Board of Governors of the International Atomic Energy Agency and the Industrial Development Board.

He has worked as a professor at the Faculty of International Relations at Universidad del Salvador, and taught classes at the Latin American Faculty of Social Sciences. He has also taught at the Catholic University of Argentina. In 1998, Estrada-Oyuela was appointed Distinguished Lecturer on the Global Community and its Challenges at the Institute for International Studies at Stanford University, and as visiting professor of the Program on Information and Resources at Columbia University (1999–2000).

=== Kyoto Protocol ===
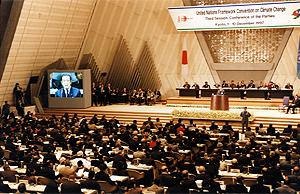
Climate Change Conference at the Kyoto International Conference Center in Japan, December 1997

He was elected Chairman of the Negotiating Committee for the United Nations Framework Convention on Climate Change (UNFCCC) in March 1993. Estrada-Oyuela chaired the negotiations for the Kyoto Protocol from 1995 to 1997, and successive meetings of the UNFCCC from 1991 to 2001.

In 1997 he presided over the two week conference in Kyoto, Japan, which resulted in the unanimous agreement on the Kyoto Protocol which was signed in the Kyoto International Conference Center. Estrada-Oyuela has been hailed as a "hero" of the Kyoto talks for his ability to achieve unanimous agreement despite years of disagreement over carbon emissions targets. He intentionally shortened the length of the conference, as he believed that the more time delegates had to discuss, the less likely they were to reach a decision. He also allowed himself to rest on the final night while representatives continued to negotiate throughout the night. In an interview with Daniel Hurst of the Lowy Institute, Estrada-Oyuela said that "To negotiate - and much more - to conduct the negotiation, you have to be very relaxed and awake", and that on the final night of the conference "I went to my hotel, just in front of the conference building, and I had dinner with my wife, and I slept for three hours while the delegates were fighting about the points. Then I returned fresh, and they were tired". Another official later described the conference as "negotiation by exhaustion". On 11 December, Estrada-Oyuela announced that the protocol would pass by unanimous agreement. David Sandalow, an assistant U.S. Secretary of State who helped negotiate the Kyoto agreement, described Estrada-Oyuela as "a grandmaster of diplomacy and the godfather of Kyoto" which he said could not have happened without Estrada-Oyuela's leadership. In 2004, Estrada-Oyuela headed the Argentine delegation to COP-10. Between 2005 and 2013, he was a member of the Kyoto Protocol Compliance Committee.

Estrada-Oyuela's role in the negotiations which led to the adoption of the Kyoto Protocol was later dramatized in the 2024 play Kyoto, which depicts Estrada-Oyuela (played by Jorge Bosch) as an adversary of American oil industry lobbyist Don Pearlman.

== Personal life ==
He is the widower of Leticia Vigil Zavala. He has 8 children, 17 grandchildren and 6 great-grandchildren.
