= Grant High School (Portland, Oregon) =

Ulysses S. Grant High School
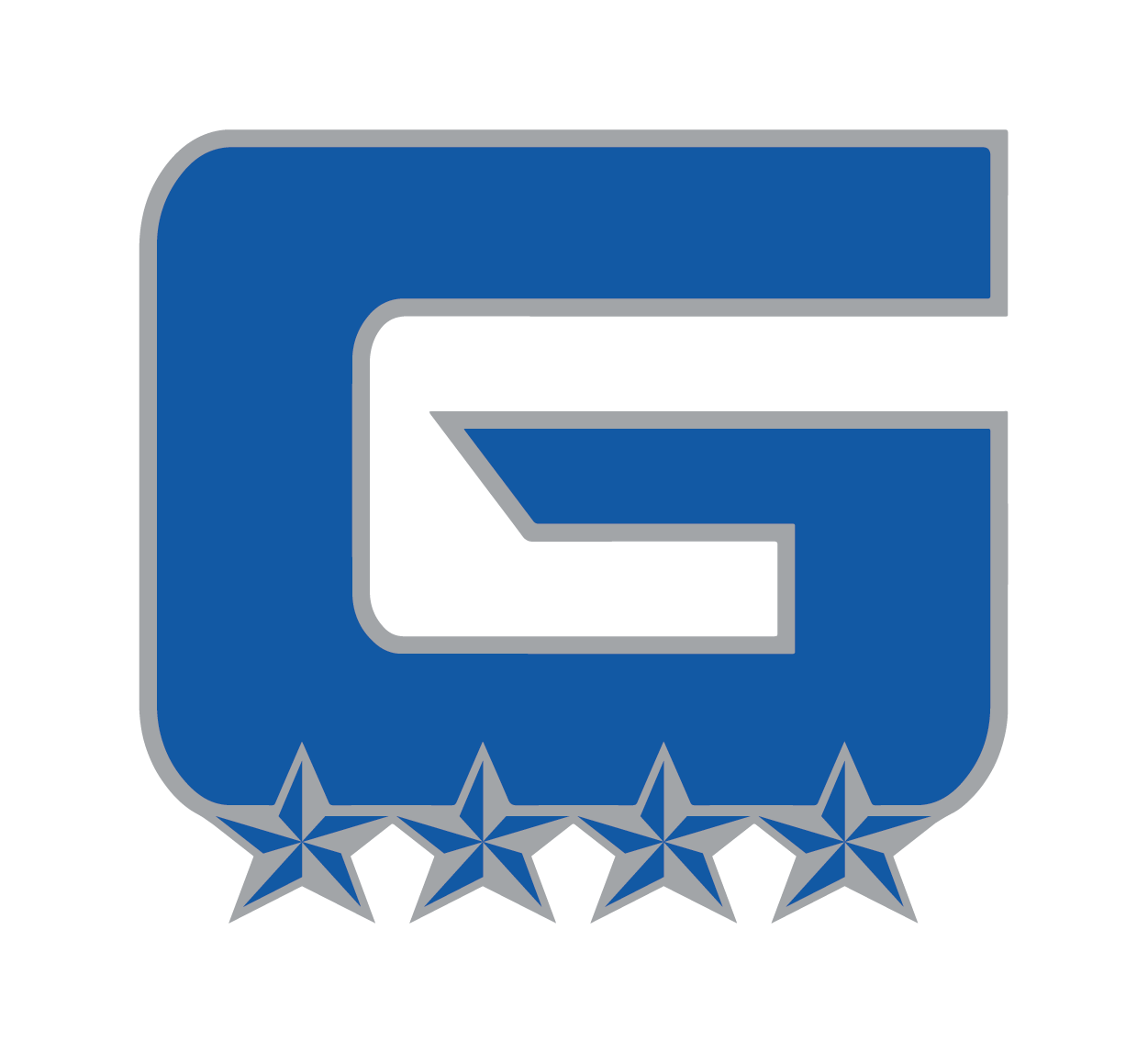

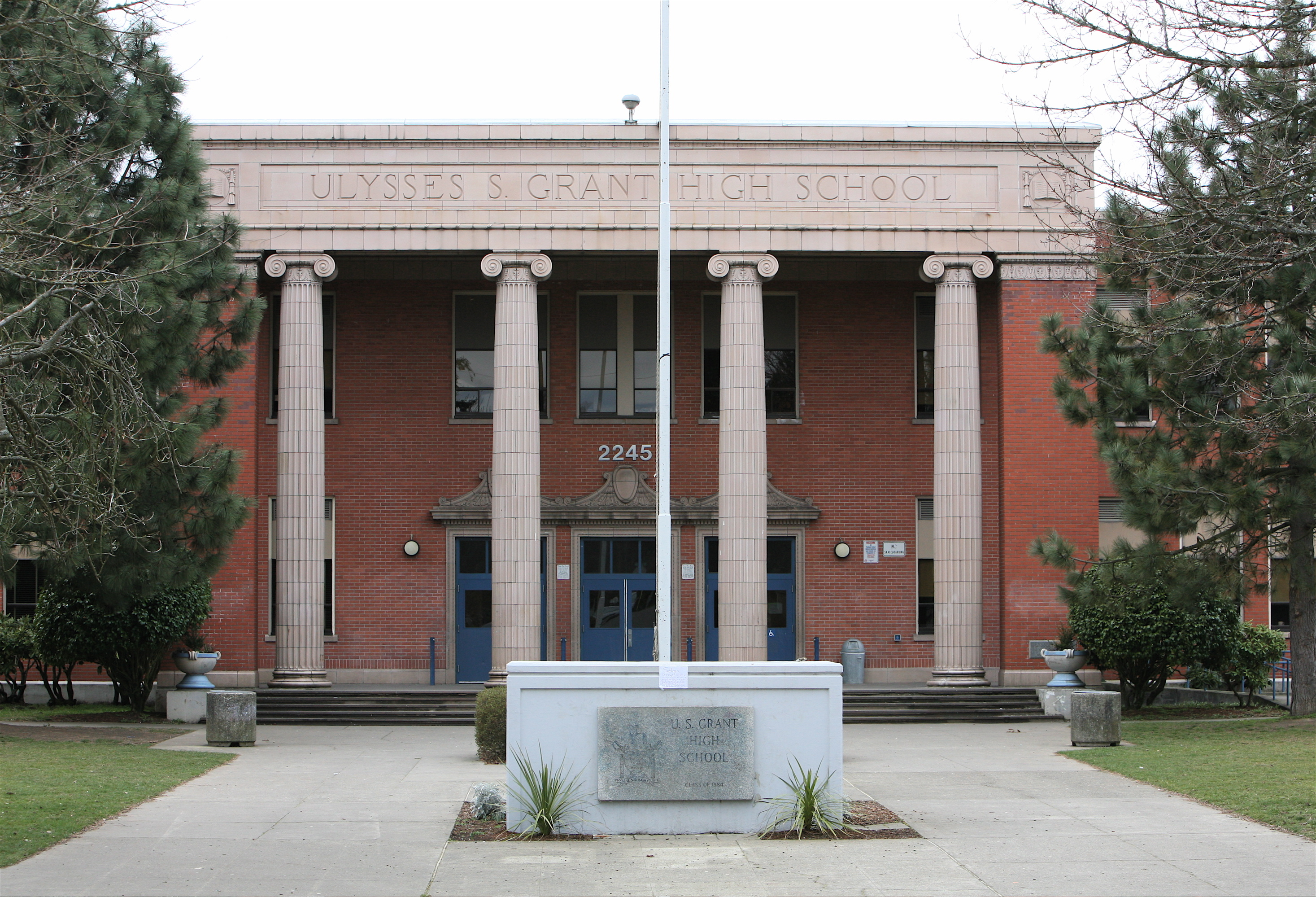
- The facade of Grant High School in 2008

Location
- 2245 Northeast 36th Avenue; Portland, (Multnomah County), Oregon 97212; United States; 45.5390°N 122.6265°W

Information
- Type: Public
- Opened: 1924
- School district: Portland Public Schools
- Principal: James McGee
- Teaching staff: 102.28 (on an FTE basis)
- Grades: 9–12
- Enrollment: 2,179 (2023–2024)
- Student to teacher ratio: 21.30
- Colors: Blue and grey
- Athletics conference: OSAA Portland Interscholastic League 6A-1
- Mascot: Generals
- Rival: Roosevelt High School
- Newspaper: Grant Magazine
- Feeder schools: Beaumont Middle School; Beverly Cleary School; Harriet Tubman Middle School; Laurelhurst School
- Website: grant.pps.net

Grant High School (GHS; formally Ulysses S. Grant High School) is a public high school in the Grant Park neighborhood of Portland, Oregon, United States. Grant serves inner and central Northeast Portland and southeastern North Portland. It is the largest high school in the Portland Public School District.

== History ==
Ulysses S. Grant High School opened in September 1924, with 1,191 students. Many of the schools in the Portland Public School district that were built between 1908 and 1932 were designed by architects Floyd Naramore and George Jones. During the early 1920s, so many schools were being built simultaneously in Portland, the district had to hire another architectural firm to design Grant High School, which is in the Classical Revival style by architects Knighton and Howell. In November 1923, the bricklayers working on Grant went on strike after the district tried to cut costs by using a maintenance worker to lay bricks.

After the Vanport flood in May 1948, Grant was home to the Vanport Extension Center (now Portland State University) through the summer of that year. Three motion pictures have been filmed at Grant High School: The made-for-TV movie Reunion (1980), Mr. Holland's Opus (1995), and Nearing Grace (2005).

Funded by a $482 million bond measure approved in 2012, a two-year modernization and expansion project of Grant High School began in June 2017 and was completed in the summer of 2019. The entire interior of the building was gutted and has been completely rebuilt. The project includes a new two-story common area, a new gymnasium, seismic retrofitting, and additional classroom space.

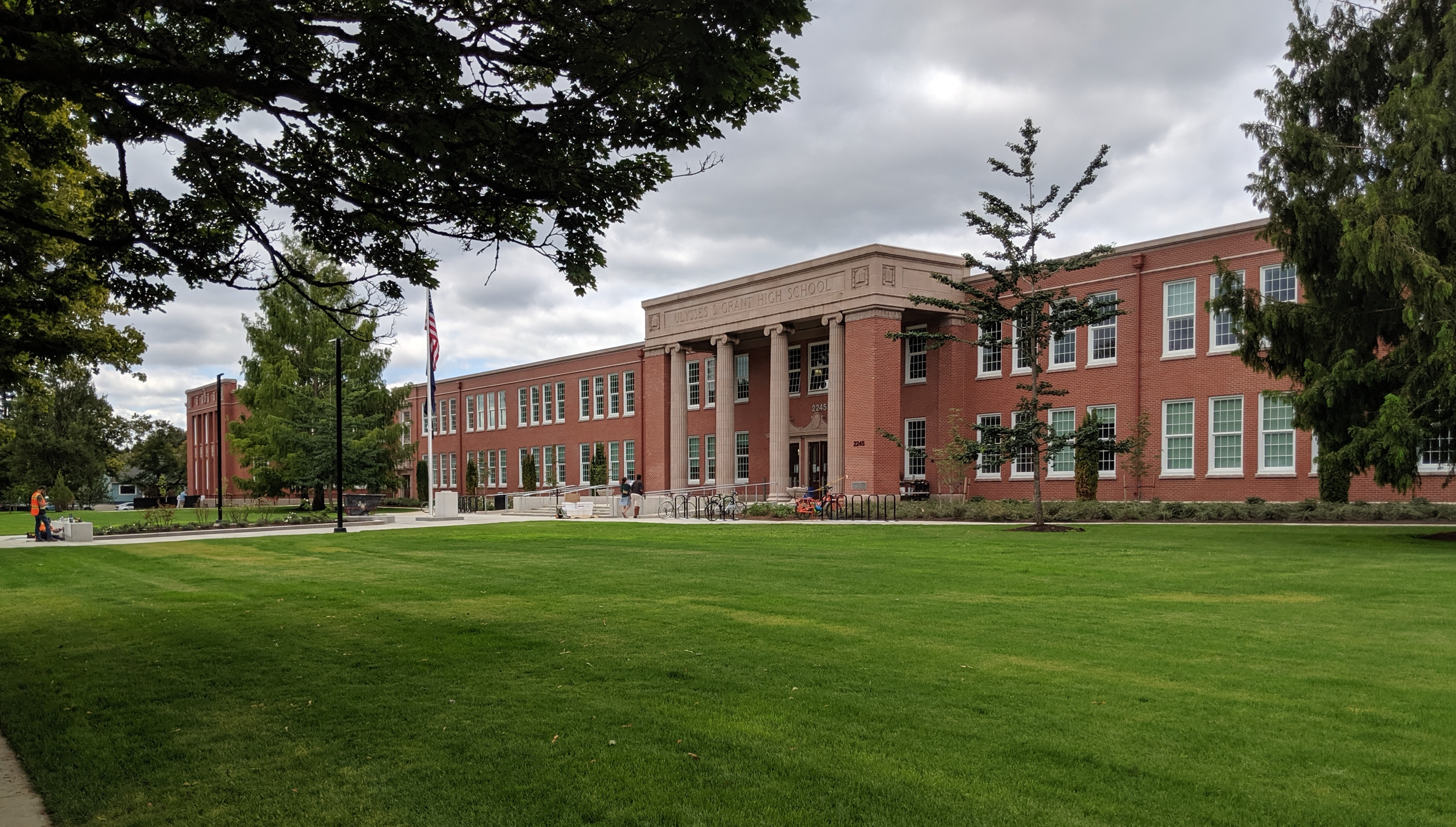
Exterior of U.S. Grant High School in Portland, Oregon (2019)

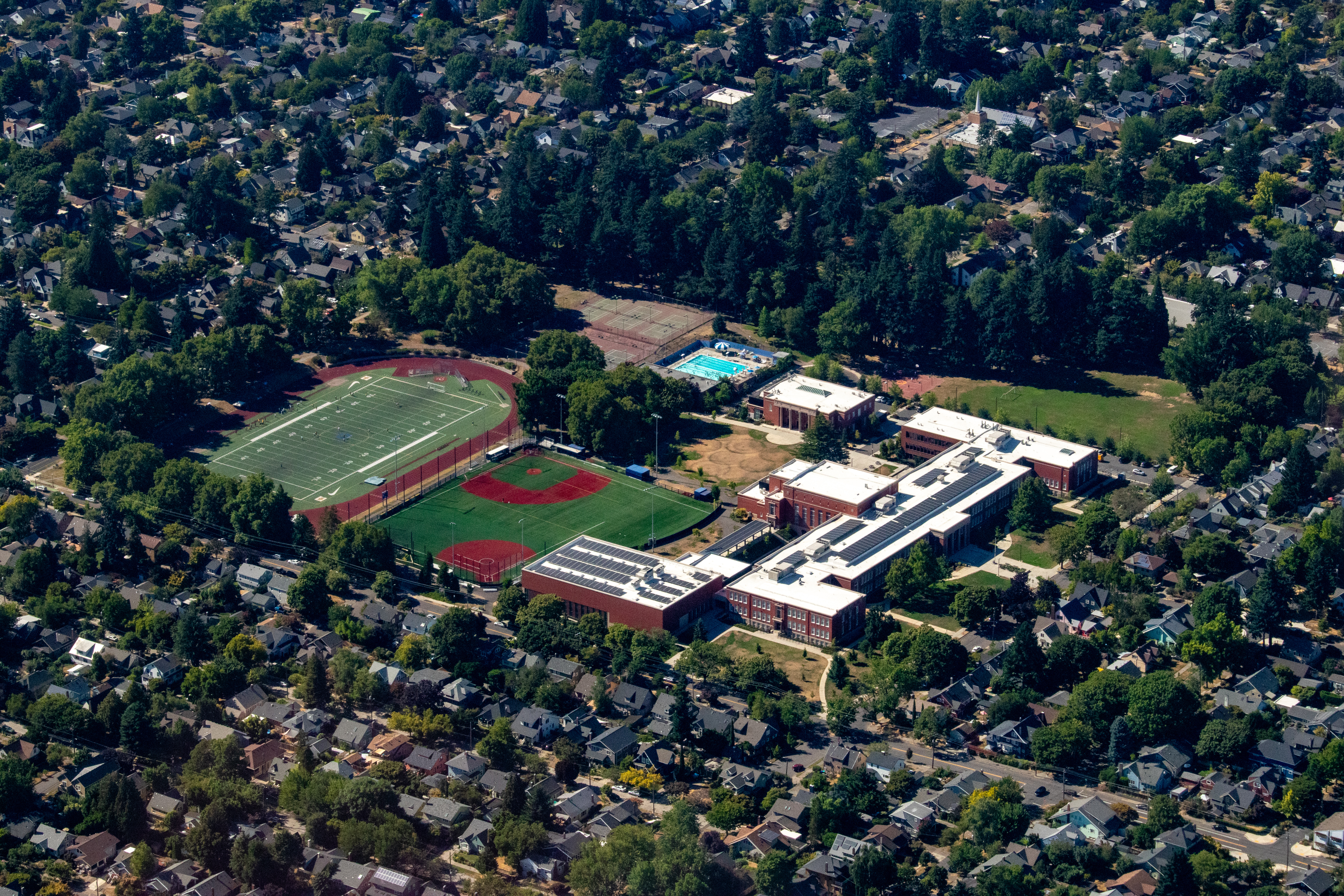
Aerial view of Grant High School (2023)

== Student profile ==
In the 2022–2023 school year, Grant's student population was 67.9% White, 7.2% Hispanic, 5.5% Black, 3.2% Asian, 0.2% Native American or Alaskan Native, 0.1% Native Hawaiian or Pacific Islander, and 14.2% mixed race.

== Extracurricular activities ==
Grant's Constitution Team has been the state champion sixteen times (2002, 2004–2009, 2011, 2013, 2015, 2017, 2018, 2021-2023 and 2026), and has won the national competition four times (2013, 2015, 2018, 2024). The 2026 team placed third at the national We the People: The Citizen and the Constitution competition in Washington, D.C.

In 2011, Grant's student newspaper, The Grantonian, was replaced by the 36-page full-color monthly Grant Magazine. In its first year, the magazine won Best In Show at the Oregon Fall Press day. It has also won the Columbia University Scholastic Press Association's Gold Crown award three years in a row, from 2014 through 2016.

== Athletics ==
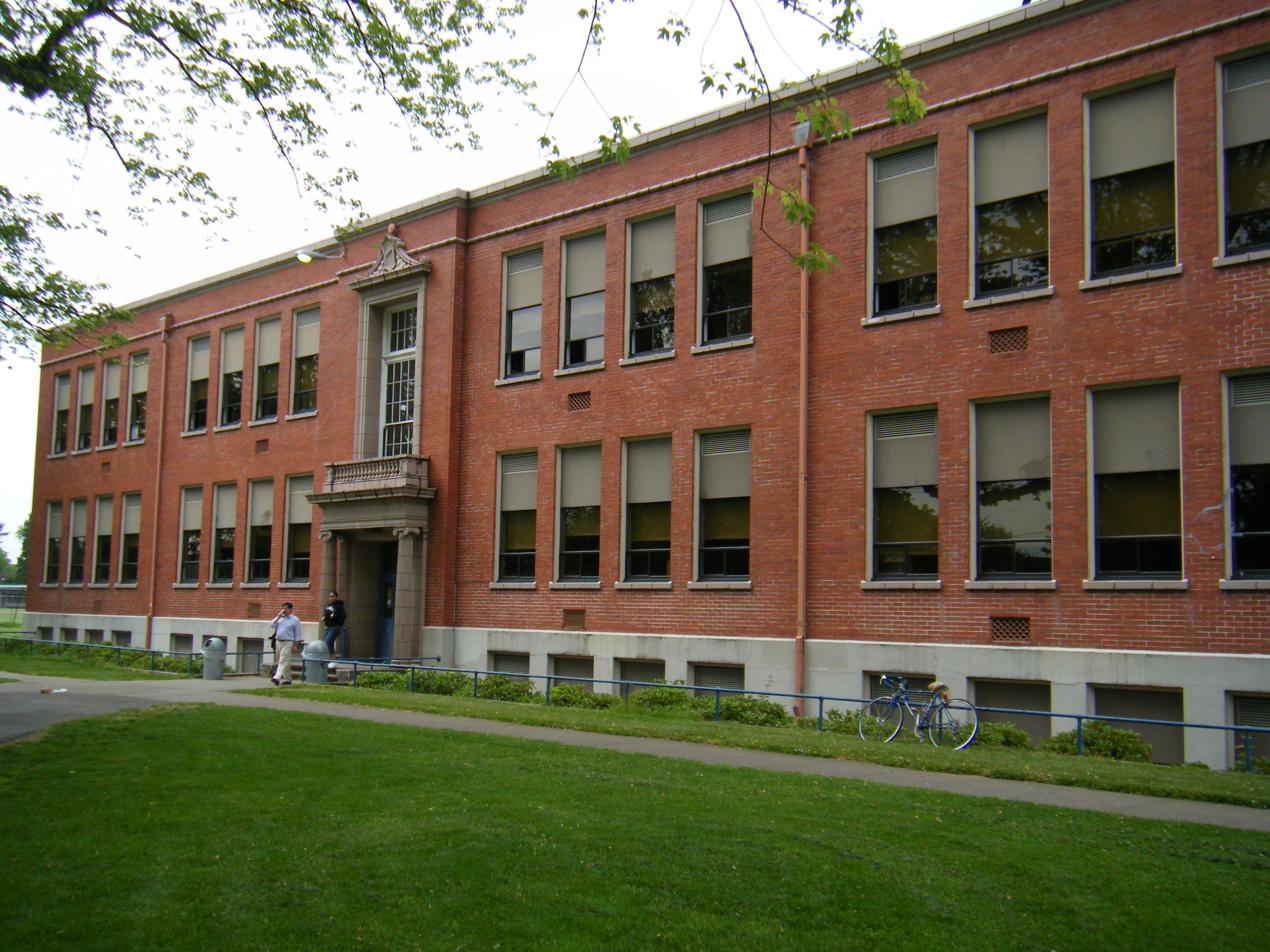
South end of Grant High School

GHS's mascot is the Grant General, in honor of its namesake General and 18th US President, Ulysses S. Grant.

=== State championships ===
- Men's football: 1943, 1945, 1946, 1949, 1950, 1963 (tie with North Salem)
- Men's gymnastics: 1982
- Men's baseball: 1951, 1958
- Men's basketball: 1969, 1986, 1988, 2008, 2018
- Men's golf: 1945, 1946, 1947, 1949
- Men's soccer team: 2008
- Men's tennis: 1949, 2005
- Men's swimming: 2010
- Men's cross country: 1957, 1958, 1963, 1964
- Women’s soccer: 2021, 2023
- Women's swimming: 1949
- Women's tennis: 1949
- Men's track and field: 1930, 1931, 1939, 1961, 1965, 1966, 1968, 1970, 1988
- Women's cross country: 1974, 2012
- Jazz band: 2022, 2024, 2025, 2026

== Notable alumni ==
- Kenneth Acker, pro football player
- Gert Boyle, president and CEO of Columbia Sportswear
- Terrell Brandon, former NBA player
- Matt Braunger, comedian, MADtv, IKEA Heights
- Beverly Cleary, children's author, National Book Award and Newbery Medal recipient
- Charles Crookham, former Oregon Attorney General
- Ian Doescher, author of the William Shakespeare's Star Wars series
- Sarah Donaldson, pediatric radiation oncologist
- Linda Douglas, actress and model
- C. Gordon Fullerton, astronaut
- Tom Grant, musician
- Marcus Harris, NFL cornerback for the Tennessee Titans
- Donald P. Hodel, former United States Secretary of the Interior and United States Secretary of Energy, former president of Focus on the Family
- Mike James, professional basketball player
- June Jones, NFL player, college and pro football head coach
- Thomas Lauderdale, pianist of band Pink Martini
- Lorry I. Lokey, founder of Business Wire, philanthropist
- Riley Mattson, former NFL offensive tackle
- Connie McCready, former mayor of Portland
- Jinkx Monsoon, actor and drag queen
- Mike Moser, basketball player
- Darryl Motley, MLB Kansas City Royals outfielder
- Janee Munroe, violist
- Bob Packwood, lawyer, former U.S. Senator
- Donald Pearlman, lawyer and oil industry lobbyist
- Philip Quinton, MLS defender
- Pieter Quinton, Olympic Bronze Medalist in rowing
- Mark Radford, former NBA player
- Harry Wayland Randall, former member of International Brigades that fought in Spanish Civil War
- George Shaw, NFL quarterback
- Jefferson Smith, founder of Bus Project, former member of Oregon House of Representatives
- Sally Struthers, film and Emmy Award-winning actress of All in the Family
- Ndamukong Suh, NFL player, Miami Dolphins, Detroit Lions, Los Angeles Rams
- Robina Suwol, children's health advocate
- Caroline Walker, set world record in marathon while attending GHS
- Dominic Waters (born 1986), basketball player in the Israel Basketball Premier League
- Edward Curtis Wells, businessman
- Dan Wieden, CEO of Wieden+Kennedy
