= Sabino Vaca Narvaja =

Argentine political scientist

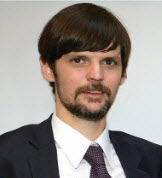

Ambassador of Argentina to China
- In office 14 April 2021 – 10 December 2023
- President: Alberto Fernández
- Preceded by: Luis María Kreckler
- Succeeded by: Marcelo Suárez Salvia

Personal details
- Born: 8 April 1975 (age 51) Córdoba, Argentina
- Parent(s): Fernando Vaca Narvaja; María Josefina Flemming
- Education: National University of Lanús
- Profession: Political scientist, professor, diplomat

Gustavo Sabino Vaca Narvaja (born 8 April 1975) is an Argentine political scientist and diplomat, and the former ambassador of Argentina to the People's Republic of China from 2021 to 2023.

== Early life and education ==
Vaca Narvaja was born on 4 April 1975 in Córdoba, son of Fernando Vaca Narvaja and María Josefa Fleming. His father is a politician who was active in Montoneros, a leftist armed group, in the 1970s. Shortly after Sabino's birth, the family went into exile and settled in Cuba, where he was brought up.

Vaca Narvaja has a licenciatura degree in political science from the National University of Lanús (UNLa) and a postgraduate degree on national defense from the Universidad de la Defensa Nacional. He has taught courses at university level and conducted research in his field.

== Career ==
An expert on China affairs, he led the Sino-Argentine co-operation programme (ProSA) of the UNLa Department of Planning and Public Policy. He was also Director General of International Affairs of the Argentine Senate from 2012 to 2015, and served as a legislative aide for the Front for Victory parliamentary bloc in the Senate as well.

In 2020, Vaca Narvaja was appointed to the Argentine Embassy in Beijing as special envoy for Commercial Promotion and Investments in China. In March 2021, the Argentine government appointed Vaca Narvaja as Argentine Ambassador in China, as a replacement for Luis María Kreckler, who never presented his credentials before the Chinese government. Vaca Narvaja presented his credentials on 15 April 2021.

In February 2022, Vaca Narvaja accompanied Argentine president Alberto Fernández on his first state visit to China, and oversaw the officialisation of Argentina's entry into the Belt and Road Initiative.

== Publications ==
- ¿Por qué China? Miradas sobre la Asociación Estratégica Integral (in Spanish). Universidad Nacional de Lanús. 2017. ISBN 9789871987634. (Editor)
- China, América Latina y la geopolitica de la nueva ruta de la seda (in Spanish). Universidad Nacional de Lanús. 2018. ISBN 9789874937100. (Editor)
