= Kyoto (play) =

2024 play

- West End Promotional Poster
- Written by: Joe Robertson; Joe Murphy
- Based on: Kyoto Protocol
- Genre: Political Drama

Premiere
- Date: 18 June 2024
- Place: Swan Theatre, Stratford-upon-Avon

Kyoto is a play by Joe Murphy and Joe Robertson, produced and acted by Royal Shakespeare Company (RSC) and Good Chance originally in Swan Theatre in 2024, then @sohoplace in 2025.

The play dramatizes how Big Oil, having learned about the risk of climate change, use legal tricks and misinformation through their representative Don Pearlman in an attempt to protect their profits. Through the determination of key representatives, an agreement is reached – the Kyoto Protocol.

== Production history ==
=== Stratford-upon-Avon (2024) ===
The play was presented by the Royal Shakespeare Company and Good Chance. The world premiere was at the Swan Theatre, Stratford-upon-Avon running from 18 June until 13 July 2024 (with a press night on 25 June). The play was directed by Stephen Daldry and Justin Martin.

=== West End (2025) ===
Following the success of the Stratford-upon Avon run, the production transferred to London's West End at @sohoplace running from 9 January to 3 May 2025 (with a press night on 16 January).

=== Off-Broadway (2025) ===
The play made its North American debut Off-Broadway at Lincoln Center's Mitzi E. Newhouse Theatre running from 8 October 2025 until 30 November (with an opening night on 3 November). Casting included Stephen Kunken (reprising his role from London) as Don Pearlman. Also joining him from the London cast were Jorge Bosch as Raul Estrada and Ferdy Roberts as John Prescott. Joining the company were Natalie Gold as Shirley Pearlman, Peter Bradbury as Fred Singer, Kate Burton as USA, and Daniel Jenkins as Bert Bolin and others.

== Cast and characters ==
Character	Stratford-upon-Avon	West End	Off-Broadway
Character	2024	2025	
Don Pearlman	Stephen Kunken	Stephen Kunken	Stephen Kunken
Shirley Pearlman	Jenna Augen	Jenna Augen	Natalie Gold
Raul Estrada	Jorge Bosch	Jorge Bosch	Jorge Bosch
Fred Singer	Vincent Franklin	Duncan Wisbey	Peter Bradbury
Bert Bolin	Dale Rapley	Dale Rapley	Daniel Jenkins
Secretariat	Olivia Barrowclough	Olivia Barrowclough	Imani Jade Powers
Kiribati	Andrea Gatchalian	Andrea Gatchalian	Taiana Tully
Germany - Angela Merkel	Ingrid Oliver	Kristin Atherton	Erin Darke
Saudi Arabia	Raad Rawi	Raad Rawi	Dariush Kashani
China	Kwong Loke	Kwong Loke	Feodor Chin
Tanzania	Jude Akuwudike	Aïcha Kossoko	Roslyn Ruff
USA	Nancy Crane	Nancy Crane	Kate Burton
UK - John Prescott	Ferdy Roberts	Ferdy Roberts	Ferdy Roberts
Japan	Togo Igawa	Togo Igawa	Rob Narita

There were many delegates at COP3, two are specifically identified in the play.

== Awards and nominations ==
=== 2025 Off-Broadway production ===
Year	Award	Category	Work	Result	Ref.
2026	Drama League Awards	Outstanding Production of a Play		Nominated	
2026	Drama League Awards	Outstanding Direction of a Play	Stephen Daldry and Justin Martin	Nominated	
2026	Drama League Awards	Distinguished Performance	Stephen Kunken	Nominated	
2026	Outer Critics Circle Award	Outstanding Projection Design	Akhila Krishnan	Nominated	
2026	Lucille Lortel Award	Outstanding Play		Nominated	
2026	Lucille Lortel Award	Outstanding Director	Stephen Daldry and Justin Martin	Nominated	
2026	Lucille Lortel Award	Outstanding Featured Performer in a Play	Jorge Bosch	Nominated	
2026	Lucille Lortel Award	Outstanding Projection Design	Akhila Krishnan	Nominated	
