= Argentina–China relations =

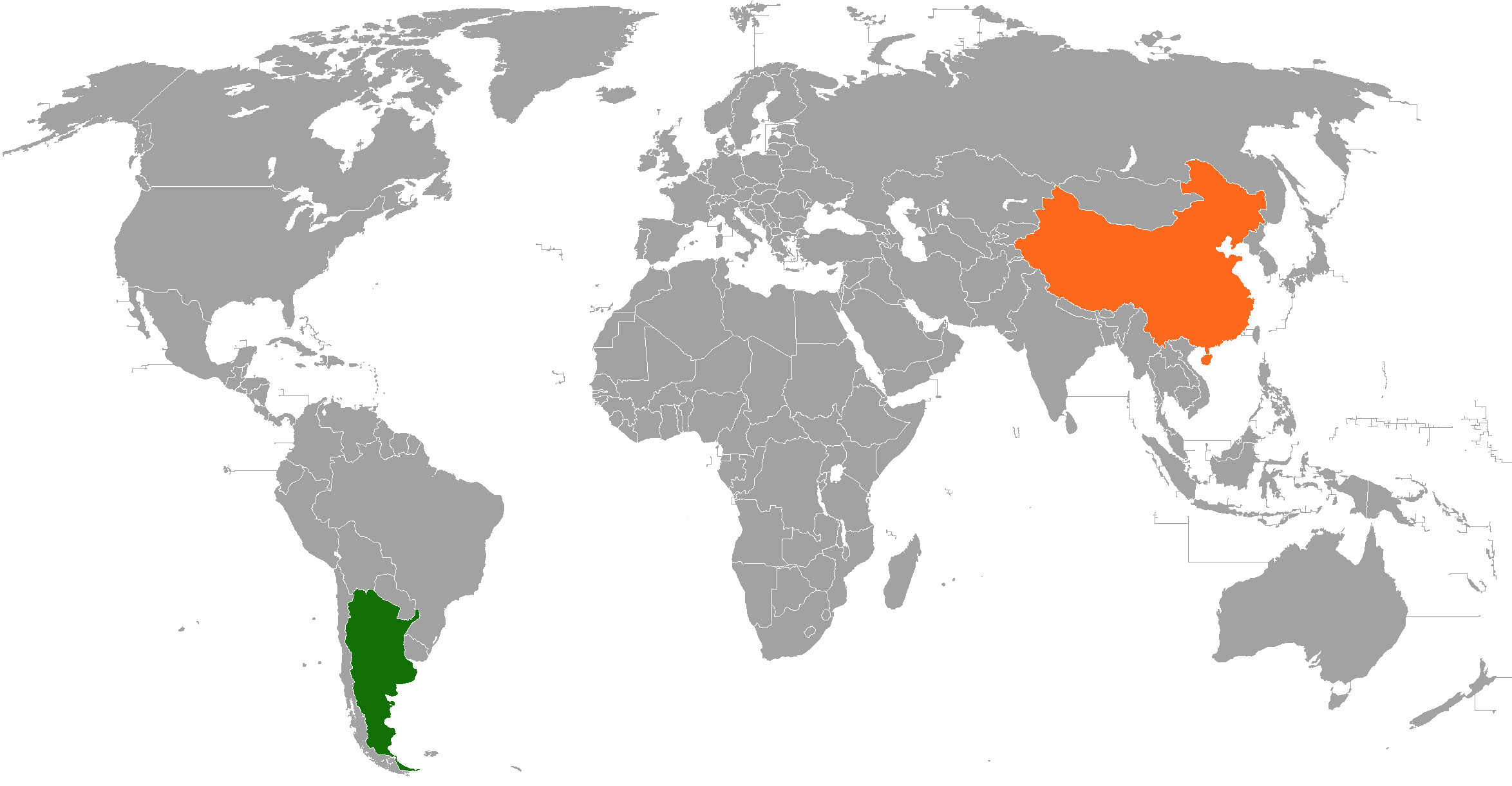
- Argentina: China

Foreign relations between the Argentine Republic and People's Republic of China have existed for decades. Both countries established diplomatic relations in 1945 as the Republic of China and again on March 19, 1972, with the PRC.

Both nations are members of the G20 and the United Nations.

== Background ==
China's Premier Zhou Enlai, during CCP Chairman Mao Zedong's leadership, steered the initial China–Latin America relations by encouraging friendly connections that eventually led to diplomatic relations. The development of diplomatic relations of China and Latin America was in the interest of developing cultural and economic ties. Organizations without ties to the governments of Latin American countries were created to help strengthen these ties between China and Latin America. Starting from 1970, until 1974, China successfully developed diplomatic relations with 12 of Latin America's countries. Five of them in the early part of the four-year span being Argentina, Brazil, Chile, Mexico, and Venezuela. Diplomatic relations were normalized in 1972, under the presidency of Alejandro Lanusse. In 1973, Isabel Perón led a mission in China as the official envoy of Justicialist Party. In 1980, General Jorge Rafael Videla, as de facto president of the country, was the first Argentine leader to visit China. For China and Latin America to expand on their diplomatic relations, China generated four interrelated concepts – “peace, mutual support, mutual benefit, and collaborative development." One of Argentina's main export is soybeans and soybean related products. The Argentine government in 2002 led by Eduardo Duhalde enforced high taxes of soybean exports, and Néstor Kirchner's following administration doubled that amount.

In November 2004, Kirchner went to Beijing to address China and Argentina's cooperation in future investments and exchanges.

In April 2020, China has become Argentina's biggest trading partner. In Feb 2022, Argentine president's Alberto Fernandez attended the Beijing Winter 2022 Olympics and met with China's Xi Jinping. Within the same month, Argentina officially joined China's Belt and Road Initiative via a memorandum of understanding (MoU) and China also issued an official statement that it backs Argentina's territorial claims over the British-run Falkland Islands.

== High-level visits ==
High-level visits from Argentina to China

- President Jorge Rafael Videla (1980)
- President Raúl Alfonsín (1988)
- President Carlos Menem (1990, 1995)
- President Fernando de la Rúa (2000)
- President Néstor Kirchner (2004)
- President Cristina Fernández de Kirchner (2010, 2015)
- President Mauricio Macri (2016, 2017)
- President Alberto Fernández (2022, 2023)

High-level visits from China to Argentina

- President & CCP General Secretary Jiang Zemin (2001)
- President & CCP General Secretary Hu Jintao (2004)
- President & CCP General Secretary Xi Jinping (2014, 2018)

== Trade ==
Two factors of economic influence within Argentina are China's emigration and exports and imports. Approximately 64% of the farmable land in Argentina is reserved for soybean production. Since 2010, Argentina has become a main exporter of soybean meal and soybean oil. The soybean meal and soybean oil percentages of Argentina range from over 40% (soybean meal) and 60% (soybean oil) of global production. In order to grow Argentina's collective income, soybeans (and soybean-related items) are charged 35% of their worth; the greater part of these profits is 5% of Argentina's collective income in soybean exportation. Argentina's financial sector has experienced changes within their soybean exports since the early 2000s.

With China's influence in Latin America during this early period, countries a part of the Mercosur organization also experienced changes within their trade evaluations. The rate of soybean production of five South American countries a part of Mercosur witnessed a 221.4% growth from 1995 to 2010. Argentina is one of China's main trading partners in South America, the trade between both countries amounting to nearly $13 billion in US currency. Before 2008, the amount of exports Argentina sent to China accounted for US$5.796 billion, and the imports from China to Argentina totaled US$7.649 billion. The trade exchange between Argentina and China showed an 80% export of soybean products to China from Argentina and Chinese industrial exports totaling 98.9% of Argentina's imports.

During the economic crisis of 2008, with the minor loss in profits in imports and exports worldwide and China managing to maintain consistency economically, China was recognized as a world power, which directly affected the relationship with Argentina. In 2008, when Argentine trades to China reached US$6,379 million, the exports of soybean products to China from Argentina stopped. Already processed soybean products were prohibited in the Chinese market due to China's own competitive soybean crushing industry.

Argentina's total investment in soybean exports was US$143 million in the past two decades and increased to US$5.55 billion. This event led to Argentina's bilateral trade deficit from 2007 to 2014 amounting to US$24,164 million. During these two decades, Argentina's economic strategies have been ideal for soybean production, which expanded from 1995's 12 million tons to 2010's 52.6 million tons. During Argentina's trade deficit, not all of Argentina's soybean products were exported to China, leading to a growth in Argentina's trading partners. In 2012, India was an important importer of Argentine soy oil, followed by China, some European countries, Iran, and Peru. In 2013, Argentina was ranked third in global soybean production, after Brazil and the United States. The amount of soybean production within Argentina totaled 18% worldwide.

When trade between China and Argentina increased after the initial deficit, China started to direct their attention towards Argentina's local markets and infrastructures. China invested in large projects in Argentina, such as roads, railroads, and shipping ports, to increase export profitability to China. Chinese interest in Argentina has been focused on areas of manufacturing connected to exports to China, such as oil, railroads to transport products across different areas of the country, and the soybean industry. In 2010, Chinese investments influenced the Economic Commission for Latin America, which largely influenced the economy in Argentina. One of China's influences has been through supplying industrial items to Argentina's growing economy, such as cellular, radio, and television equipment and computer mainframes.

In April 2023, Argentina announced it would pay for Chinese imports in yuan rather than dollars. This decision aims to relieve the country's dwindling dollar reserves. In December 2023, following the election of Javier Milei, who campaigned on breaking ties with China, China suspended a currency swap agreement with Argentina. In June 2024, the currency swap agreement was renewed.

== Chinese investment in Argentina ==
During the Presidency of Alberto Fernández, several Chinese investments were announced, although some of the projects were abandoned. In 2020, Chaco Province Governor, Jorge Capitanich signed an agreement with Chinese-Argentine company Feng Tian Food to build (initially) 3 pork production facilities, and later up to 25 facilities as of 2026, which would have an annual production of 900.000 tons of pork. The project was strongly criticized for its potential environmental effects and was later abandoned.

In February 2022, Argentina officially joined the New Silk Roads Initiative In the same month, Nucleoeléctrica Argentina S.A., the electricity generating company that operates the Embalse and Atucha I and II nuclear power plants, signed an agreement to develop a project with the China National Nuclear Corporation (CNNC), which would have included the construction of the fourth nuclear power plant in Argentina. However, due to pressure from the United States, President Javier Milei decided to cancel the project.

In 2022 Shaanxi Chemical Group planned to invest over US$1 billion in Tierra del Fuego Province to build a production facility of synthetic ammonia,urea and glyphosate along with a port. This project was abandoned.

In February 2023, Chery announced an investment of US$400 million to build an electric cars factory in Argentina, heavily considering the Santa Fe Province for the project. While it has not been cancelled, the construction has not started as of 2025.

In April 2023, representatives of the China Gezhouba Group Corporation announced that they would invest US$500 million to finance the construction of two hydroelectric dams in Santa Cruz Province, in 2024, the projects were paralyzed due to the inactivity from Argentine President Javier Milei regarding the renewal of contracts with the Chinese company, Gezhouba opted to cut its losses and leave the country.

In November 2024, Santa Cruz Province Governor, Claudio Vidal signed a Letter of Intent with Hongdong Fisheries to improve the ports in the province and build shipyards to assist Chinese fishing companies that operate in the Argentine Sea.

In February 2025 a lithium chloride production facility owned by Ganfeng Lithium was inaugurated in General Güemes, Salta Province. With a US$980 million investment (US$790 million for the project and US$190 million for a solar park), the facility has a production capacity of 20,000 tons per year. Construction took nearly three years, beginning in May 2022. The Chinese company continues its expansion in Argentina, benefiting from the Regime of Incentives for Large Investments (RIGI) which enhances conditions for foreign investment in strategic sectors. The company already operates in Jujuy Province, as a partner of Lithium Americas in the Cauchari-Olaroz mine, and has projects in Pozuelos-Pastos Grandes (under construction in 2025) and Incahuasi-Arizaro (in advanced exploration in 2025). According to Wang Xiaoshen, president of Ganfeng Lithium Group, the company has invested US$3 billion in Argentina.

== Violation of Argentina's EEZ ==
There have been a number of reported violations of Argentina's Exclusive Economic Zone by Chinese trawlers which extract approximately 950,000 tonnes per year of fish worth around US$2.47 billion from the Argentine Sea. These have resulted in clashes with the Argentine Coast Guard.

- On 17 June 2013, Argentine Coast Guard apprehended a Chinese fishing vessel off its coast.
- On 15 March 2016, Chinese fishing trawler Lu Yan Yuan Yu 010 violated the EEZ, and was sunk by Argentine Coast Guard. There were no fatalities.
- On 9 March 2018, Argentina issued an International capture order for five Chinese boats illegally fishing in its EEZ.
- On 4 March 2019, a Chinese fishing trawler Hua Xiang 801 which was fishing illegally within the country's exclusive economic zone was fired upon by an Argentine Coast guard vessel.

== Chinese involvement in migration and land investments ==
=== Residency ===
In 2010 Argentina's National Census listed 11,804 Chinese immigrants living within its borders - 75.6% of this number were immigrants from the People's Republic of China. Foreign immigrants are allowed to stay in the country as either "permanent residents", refugees, or "temporary" residents due to the 2004 Argentine Migration Act. The National Directorate of Migration (NDM) confirmed that 17,505 Chinese citizens had their permanent residency requests approved between 2004 and 2013. After this period, the NDM published their completed analysis/study in 2014 concerning the 2003–2013 census of Chinese residents to show that 48.8% of Chinese immigrants had violated Argentine laws at one point during this time period. This statistic represents a relatively small number of Chinese immigrants actually within the prison system - specifically the 19 Chinese immigrants out of 2,259 foreigners inside the Argentine prison system.Crimes committed against the Chinese citizens of Argentina remained unresolved. The Argentine government submitted requests during this time to China's Ministry of Public Security for help with solving and reducing the number of repeat cases. After the first initial visit from the Chinese police delegation of December 2011, homicides continued, and Argentina and China together decided to resume the cooperation agreement of 1997 in order to solve homicide cases and crimes related to human and drug trafficking.

Both the Chinese government and the Argentine government regulate the migration communication and flow through administrative decisions. Illegal immigration in 2004 was addressed by the Argentine government's Decree No. 1169 that insisted on regulating the migration of people from countries not a part of Mercosur.

An impact of the Chinese community within Argentina's society and government has spread through the creation of organizations assembled by citizens, and establishment of offices representing Chinese companies within the last ten years. Chinese community organizations and groups within Argentina aim to improve education and advancement of media, as well as provide space for incoming offices of Chinese corporations.

=== Land investment ===
Chinese ventures have focused on governing parcels of open land in Argentina for resources and food production wholly aimed towards Chinese purchase. Neoliberal reforms endorsed by Latin American countries recognize foreign investments as being equal to domestic investment. After the Chinese globalization program of 1999, "Going Global", aimed at expanding capital for the Chinese government on a global scale, Chinese corporations such as China International Water and Electric Corporation started to focus on garnering land in Latin America in 2000. During discussion of global expanse within Argentina, it was determined that Argentine land being invested in by Chinese companies would not officially be considered Chinese land, however China would have control over the production of resources within the area. As of 2015, Chinese land investment discussions have stopped due to differences in views.

== Military relations ==
In February 2015, CCP general secretary Xi Jinping and his Argentine counterpart, Cristina Fernandez de Kirchner, announced prospective ambitious arms sales and defense cooperation agreements extending beyond the scope of any made. These plans include Argentina's purchase or coproduction of 110 8×8 VN-1 APCs, 14 JF-17/FC-1 multirole fighters, and five P18 Malvinas class patrol ships. While the government of President Mauricio Macri, elected in December 2015, soon dropped the arms purchases from China. that also authorizes construction of satellite tracking facility near Las Lajas, Neuquén; base is managed by People's Liberation Army Strategic Support Force. Per Argentine ambassador to China, Diego Guelar, China has agreed to use the base only for civilian purposes. In 2025, Argentina suspended construction of the China Argentina Radio Telescope at the Félix Aguilar Observatory due to U.S. concerns about dual-use.

== Resident diplomatic missions ==
of Argentina in China

- Beijing (Embassy)
- Guangzhou (Consulate-General)
- Hong Kong (Consulate-General)
- Shanghai (Consulate-General)

of China in Argentina

- Buenos Aires (Embassy)

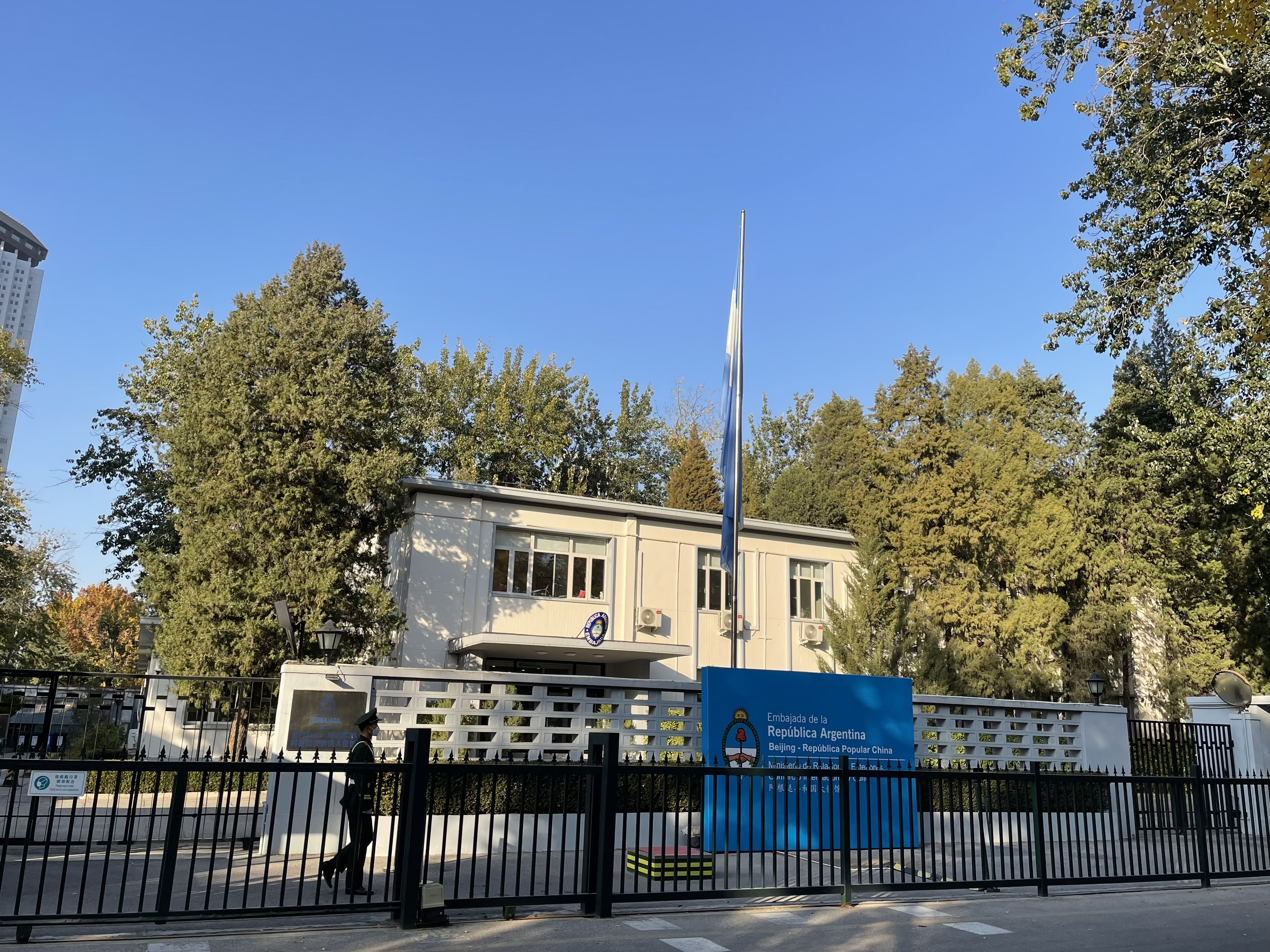
Embassy of Argentina in Beijing

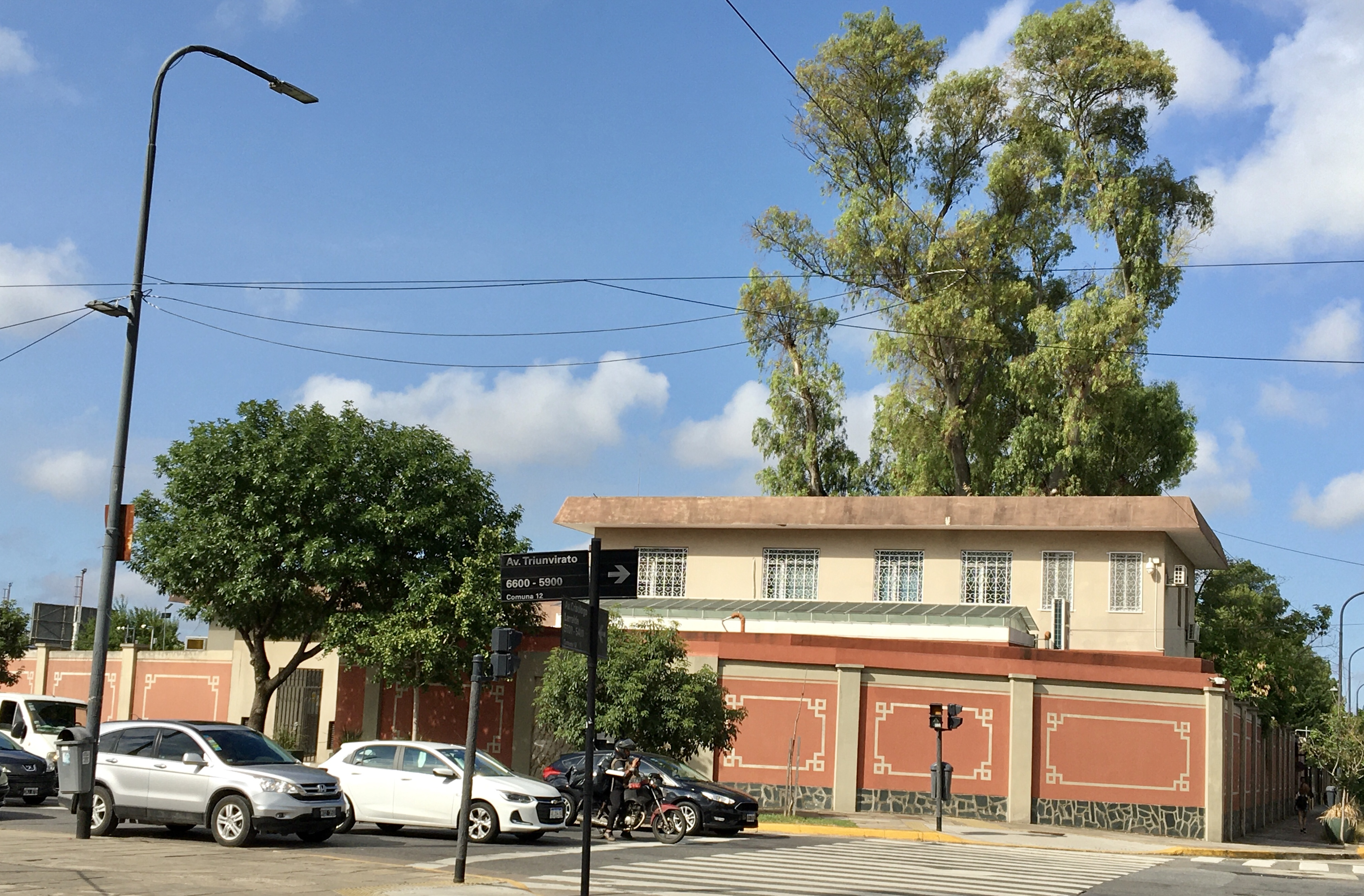
Embassy of China in Buenos Aires

== Public opinion ==
A survey published in 2026 by the Pew Research Center found that 50% of Argentinians had a favorable view of China, while 32% had an unfavorable view.

== See also ==
- Chinese Argentines
- Embassy of Argentina, Beijing
- Foreign relations of Argentina
- Foreign relations of China
