= Harry Wayland Randall =

American soldier and photographer (1915–2021)

Harry Wayland Randall, Junior.
- Randall in 1938 while in Spain
- Born: December 20, 1915; Spokane, Washington, United States of America
- Died: November 11, 2012 (aged 96); Snowflake, Arizona, United States of America
- Military Career
- Allegiance: Spanish Republic; Canada
- Branch: International Brigades; Canadian Army
- Unit: MacKenzie-Papineau Battalion of the "Abraham Lincoln" XV International Brigade
- Conflicts: Spanish Civil War; Second World War

Harry W. Randall Jr. (December 20, 1915 – November 11, 2012) served in the Abraham Lincoln Brigade and was the Chief Photographer of the Photographic Unit of the XV International Brigade.

== Early life ==
Randall was born in December 1915 in Spokane, Washington, and raised in Portland, Oregon. He was the oldest of three children born to Harry W. Randall Sr., an insurance adjuster, and Frances E. Randall, a schoolteacher. As a young man he developed an interest in motion pictures and, after graduating from Grant High School in 1934, enrolled in Reed College in Portland. While there he was drawn into a world of political action, joining with other progressive students on campus to support labor causes and to protest the rise of fascism in Europe. He collected food for striking maritime workers in 1934 and distributed leaflets at a lumber-workers strike in 1935. He left Reed after a year, found work as a projectionist for an advertising agency and, with a friend, began distributing foreign films in Washington State and Oregon.

== Civil War ==
When the Civil War erupted in Spain, Randall enlisted in the International Brigades—battalions of foreign volunteers that supported the Republican Army—to fight against Franco's fascist forces. Randall sailed from New York on the S.S. Georgic on June 12, 1937, arriving in Spain on July 1, 1937. Following training with the MacKenzie-Papineau Battalion in Tarazona he was promoted to the rank of Sergeant and became the Chief Photographer of the Photographic Unit of the 15th International Brigade. He served in Spain until the withdrawal of the volunteer forces and returned to the United States on the S.S. Ausonia on December 20, 1938.

Randall relocated to Canada and found work with the National Film Board of Canada as the head of the Science Film unit. In 1944 he enlisted in the Canadian Army and served in England during the war making newsreels with the Film and Photo Unit. After the war, Randall resumed work with the National Film Board. He returned to New York City in 1952 and for the next 30 years produced, edited, and directed medical films. Randall married Doreen Cavalier, a registered nurse, in 1956 and the couple had two children and settled in Northern New Jersey. In 1983 Randall retired from the American Cancer Society after 18 years as the director of the organization's film unit.

== 15th International Brigade Photographic Unit ==
The Photographic Unit of the XV International Brigade was charged with creating a photographic record of the 15th Brigade for publication in the Brigade's newsletter Volunteer for Liberty, and for distribution to news outlets in the United States, England, and Canada. The photos were intended to boost the morale of the volunteers in Spain and foster sympathy and support for the Republican Army abroad. In addition to Randall, the unit was staffed by photographers Benjamin Katine and Anthony B. Drossel, as well as lab technician William H. Oderaka. The team was given full access to move about the camps, chronicling the troops at rest, and venturing to the front to capture scenes of the battalions in the trenches and under fire.

As part of their routine, each photographer logged and processed the film he shot. Every photograph was assigned a unique number, which was etched into the negative, and given a caption, which was recorded in one of five logs. Photographs were placed in albums, and copies were distributed to the press. Extra prints were sold to the troops for a nominal fee. Although initially successful in procuring the necessary photographic equipment to carry out their work, as the war progressed lack of film and printing paper hampered the unit's operation. Film development under battle conditions also proved challenging. Like the rest of the Brigade the development lab was a mobile unit, and was required to retreat or advance on short notice. On more than one occasion film and equipment were sacrificed or lost.

Following the war, Randall returned to the United States and brought with him the Brigade's photographic archives - negatives, albums of prints, and logs. In January 1939 Randall spent several weeks in the New York Film and Photo League darkroom developing a complete set of fresh prints and making enlargements of all of the photographs taken by the unit in Spain. At the request of the British veterans, Randall also made 8x10 inch prints of images of the British Battalion and sent them along with copy negatives to the veterans' organization in England. In the intervening years the prints, negatives, and logs passed through many hands (most often fellow veterans). In the course of changing stewardship, many prints were dispersed, the original logs separated, and the albums disassembled. This collection represents the most complete record of the Photographic Unit's work in Spain.

Randall resided in Snowflake, Arizona with his daughter, son in law and granddaughter until his death. He was predeceased by his wife, Doreen.

The Spanish province of Aragon (August 2008 through March 2009) presented an exhibition of the work of the Photographic Unit consecutively in Zaragoza, Teruel and Huesca. The Goberno De Aragon ( Departmento de Education, Cultura y Deporte) also published an accompanying book called "La Brigada Lincoln en Aragon - 1937 - 1938".
