= Grant Magazine =

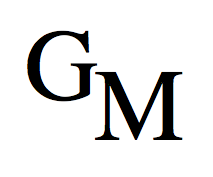
- Frequency: Monthly
- Format: Multimedia news magazine
- Publisher: Premier Press
- Founded: 2011
- Based in: Grant High School, Portland, Oregon

The Grant Magazine is a monthly magazine published by students of Grant High School, in Portland, Oregon, United States. It has won the Columbia University Scholastic Press Association's Gold Crown award six years in a row, from 2014 through 2019.

== History ==
The Grant Magazine was launched in 2011, replacing the Grantonian, which had previously been Grant High School's newspaper. It was founded by the principal at the time, Vivian Orlen. The Grant Magazine's previous adviser was Dave Austin, who had worked for The Oregonian for 22 years and is now the Communications Director of Multnomah County. The current adviser of Grant Magazine is Matt Daniels. Stories in the Grant Magazine have brought up issues including hazing, sexist and racist posts on social media by students at Grant High School, teen suicide, controversial curriculum changes, homelessness, Title IX, the Portland Public Schools lead crisis, eating disorders, drug and alcohol use, sexual assault, and the use of the N-Word. As of April 2015, the Grant Magazine had over 400 subscribers, and is distributed for free at Grant High School.

== Awards ==
For six years in a row, from 2014 through 2019, the Grant Magazine has won the Columbia University Scholastic Press Association's Gold Crown award, one of the highest awards for scholastic journalism.

Grant Magazine's March 2018 issue was named "Best Single Issue in the Northwest" by the Northwest Scholastic Press (NWSP). In 2019, Grant Magazine received "International First Place" by Quill & Scroll.

== Let's Talk About the N-Word ==
The Grant Magazine issue for March 2016 was titled Let's Talk About the N-Word, and dealt with race and the N-Word in Grant High School. The issue was inspired by the increasing use of racial slurs by students at Grant High School. It describes the history of the N-Word, and its culture today. The issue features interviews with Andrew Young; Paul Coakley, who was a principal of Roosevelt High School, and a number of African Americans in the Grant community.

The N-Word issue inspired a school-wide discussion about race at Grant High School.

== The Sexual Assault Issue ==
The December 2018 issue of Grant Magazine was a themed issue dedicated to the topic of sexual assault in the Grant High School community and the world. The issue was inspired by the posting of a list in the women's restroom at Grant High School in which an anonymous student named several students as alleged sexual predators.

The Sexual Assault Issue sparked conversation in the Grant community and encouraged discussion within the Grant High School administration to better address the issue of sexual assault
