= Stephen Kunken =

American actor

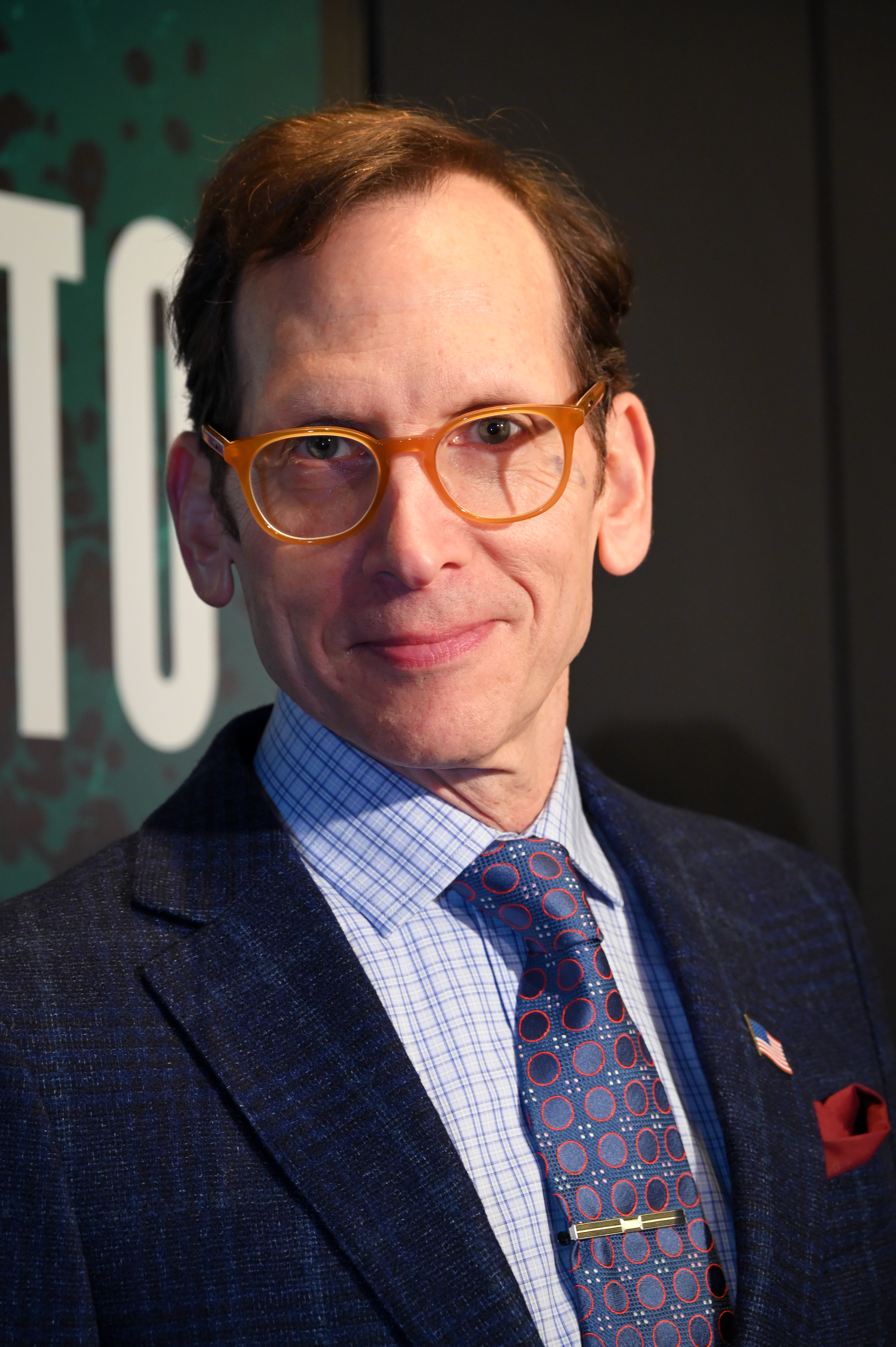
- Kunken in 2025
- Education: Tufts University (BA); Juilliard School (GrDip)
- Occupation: Actor
- Years active: 1998–present
- Spouse: Jenn Thompson (m. 2005)
- Children: 1
- Website: Official website

Stephen Michael Kunken is an American actor. He is known for the roles of Ari Spyros on Showtime's Billions and Commander Putnam on Hulu's The Handmaid's Tale. Graduating with top honors from The Juilliard School, Kunken has an extensive theater career, appearing on Broadway in seven different productions and countless off-Broadway and regional productions. He is most readily known for playing Andy Fastow in the Broadway play Enron, for which he received a Tony Award nomination for Featured Actor in a Play. Other Broadway credits include Frost/Nixon and Rock 'n' Roll.

== Early life and education ==
Stephen Michael Kunken was raised on Long Island in Upper Brookville, New York. His father is a dentist and his mother is a former grade school teacher. He is Jewish.

Kunken received a B.A. degree from Tufts University in 1993. He is a graduate of the Juilliard School's Graduate Acting program, where as a member of the Drama Division's Group 26 (1993–1997) he was awarded both The John Houseman Prize and the Pearl and Rolands Grant. His classmates included David Denman and Alan Tudyk.

== Career ==
Kunken has appeared on Broadway as David Halberstam in David Auburn's The Columnist (2012); opposite Kathleen Turner in High (2011); Tom Stoppard’s Rock 'n' Roll (2007); Frost/Nixon (2007) (for which he received Outer Critics Circle Award (Outstanding Featured Actor in a Play) and Drama League Award nominations),; Festen (2006); and Proof (replacement, 2002). For his role as CFO Andrew Fastow in Lucy Prebble's Enron, he received a 2010 Tony Award nomination for Featured Actor in a Play.

Off-Broadway, he played Tim Andrews in the award-winning Richard Nelson cycle of Apple Plays, which includes That Hopey Changey Thing, Sweet and Sad, and Regular Singing in 2013 at The Public.

He played the title role of Nikolai Nabakov in Lincoln Center Theater's production of Richard Nelson's Nikolai and the Others in 2013. He has appeared as Dr. Phil in the critically acclaimed production of Kate Fodor's romantic comedy RX (2012, Primary Stages production); and as the Stage Manager in the 2009 David Cromer-directed revival of Thornton Wilder's Our Town (replacement as of January 5, 2010, Barrow Street Theatre); Theresa Rebeck's Our House (2009, Playwrights Horizons); Fabulation at Playwrights Horizons (2004); A Very Common Procedure by Courtney Baron at Manhattan Class Company (2007) (for which he received a Drama League Award nomination); Journals of Mihail Sebastian by David Auburn with the Keen Company in 2004 and Misalliance at the Roundabout Theatre Company (1997).

He performed in The Story (2003), Henry VIII (1997) and A Dybbuk (1997) at the Public Theater.

Regionally, Kunken has appeared in Quartermaine’s Terms (2009), True West (2009), Three Sisters as Solyony (2008) all at the Williamstown Theatre Festival; and Mister Roberts as Doc at the Kennedy Center in 2005, among many other credits.

He played the lead role of lawyer Don Pearlman in Kyoto (2025) at the @sohoplace theatre.

His television credits include: Unforgettable, Blue Bloods, The Good Wife, Gossip Girl, The Unusuals, New Amsterdam, Law & Order, Law & Order: Criminal Intent, Law & Order: SVU, The Sopranos, Spin City, Far East (2001, TV movie), Mary and Rhoda (2000, TV movie) and The Affair.

In film, Kunken's work includes The Wolf of Wall Street (2013), Still Alice (2014), Café Society (2016), A Birder's Guide to Everything (2013), The Bay (2012), Price Check (2012), Extremely Loud and Incredibly Close (2011), All Good Things (2010), Taking Woodstock (2009), The Girl in the Park (2008), Wait 'til This Year, Light and the Sufferer (2014), and Bamboozled (2000).

== Personal life ==
Kunken and stage director Jenn Thompson were married in 2005. The couple have a daughter.

== Filmography ==
Film
Year	Title	Role	Notes
2000	Bamboozled	David	
2007	The Girl in the Park	Leo	
2007	Light and the Sufferer	Douglas	
2009	Taking Woodstock	Mel	
2010	All Good Things	Todd Fleck	
2011	Extremely Loud and Incredibly Close	Teacher	
2012	Price Check	Cartwright	
2012	The Bay	Dr. Abrams	
2013	A Birder's Guide to Everything	Ted	
2013	Blumenthal	Barry	
2013	The Wolf of Wall Street	Jerry Fogel	
2014	Still Alice	Dr. Benjamin	
2015	Bridge of Spies	William Tompkins	
2016	Custody	Mark Dooley	
2016	Café Society	Leonard	
2016	Jason Bourne	Baumen	
2019	Otherhood	Joel Lieberman	
2020	Hillbilly Elegy	Phillip Roseman	

Television
Year	Title	Role	Notes
2014-2019	The Affair	Harry	8 episodes
2016-2023	Billions	Ari Spyros	41 episodes
2017-2022	The Handmaid's Tale	Warren Putnam	19 episodes
2022	A Spy Among Friends	James Jesus Angleton	6 episodes
