= Robina Suwol =

American businessman

Robina Suwol is an American business executive, the founder and executive director of California Safe Schools a children's environmental health and justice coalition founded in 1998.

== Awards and recognition ==
Suwol is a two-time Volvo Hero Award recipient (third and fifth), Environmental Protection Agency Region IX - 2007 Environmental Award, Women of Spirit Award, and Los Angeles Children's Council Leading Boldly Award, South Coast Air Quality Management District Environmental Stewardship Award, 2007 U.S. Western Pollution Prevention Hero, Prevention Magazine Hero, 1st Amendment Coalition's 2009 Beacon Award, Charles Gibbs 2009 Environmental Award, City of Los Angeles Mayor's Angel Award, WebMD 2012 Health Hero, and 2013 Francis Eleanor Smith, "Helping the Helpless Children" Award.

UTNE Reader named Suwol "One of Fifty Visionaries Who are Changing the World". Articles about her have appeared in Ladies Home Journal, Child Magazine, Parent, Prevention Magazine, National Safety Council magazine, Children's Advocate, as well as the Los Angeles Times, and the Los Angeles Daily News. Suwol is the mother of designer Brandon Stirling Baker

California Safe Schools Executive Director Named One of Nation's Top Hometown Heroes.

EPA honors Pacific Southwest environmental heroes.

South Coast Air Quality Management Interview-Robina Suwol.

Mothers, teachers concerned about leukemia deaths at California elementary school.

LA environmental school site in toxic soil cleanup.

A crusader for California's kids.

Los Angeles County Want Bigger Role As Toxic Watchdogs.

Local Pesticide Concerns Lead To Positive Changes In Public Schools.

California Safe Schools Honors Environmental and Educational Leaders

2015 Carl Gibbs Environmental Award

2017 Dangerman Hero Awards.

2019 AQMD Clean Air Award Honorees.
