= Embassy of Argentina, Beijing =

Embassy of Argentina in the People's Republic of China
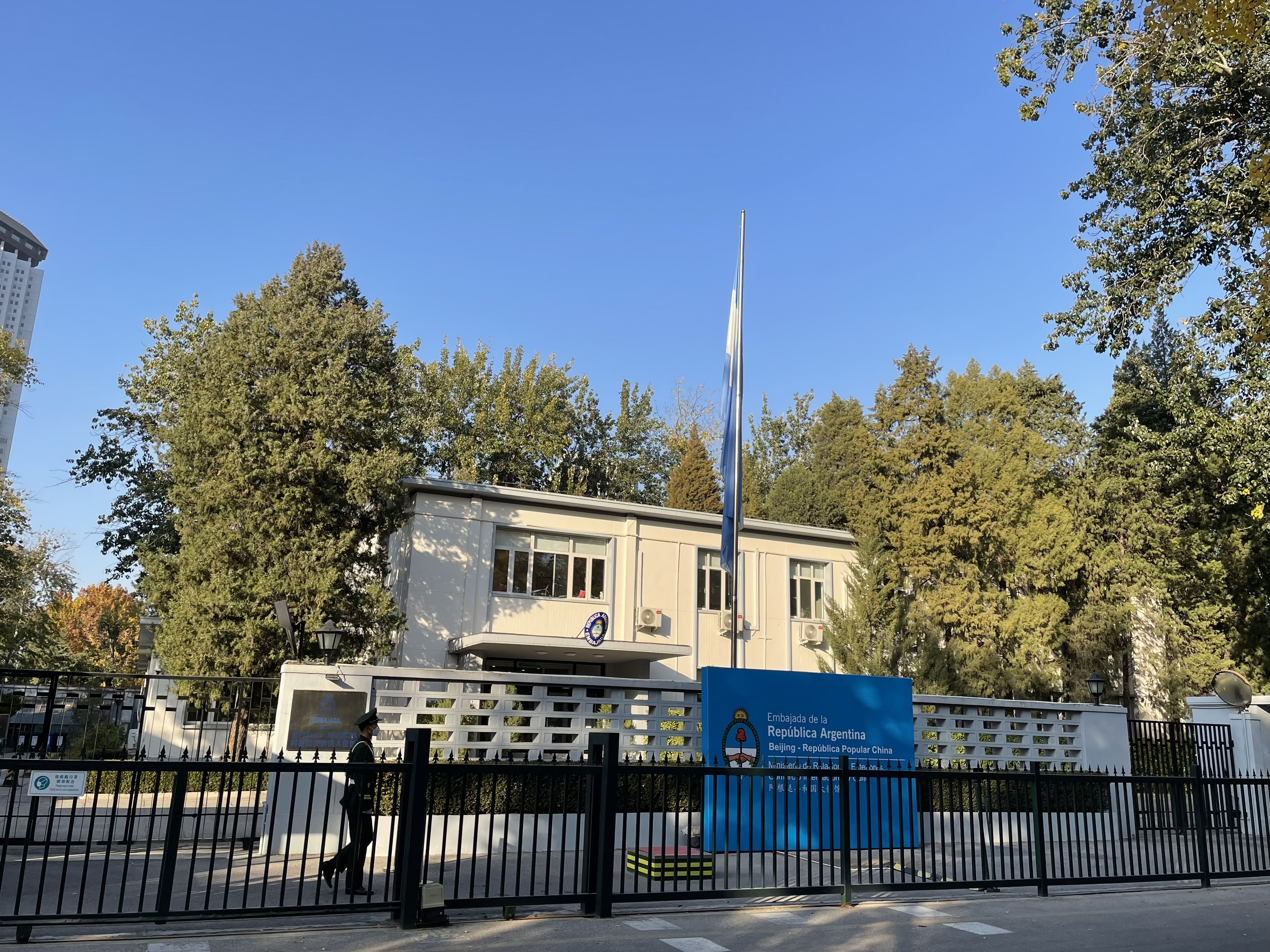
- Embassy of Argentina in Beijing, People's Republic of China
- Location: Beijing
- Address: 11 Dongwu St, Sanlitun, Chaoyang District, Beijing 北京三里屯东五街11号
- Coordinates: 39.944°N 116.455898°E
- Ambassador: Marcelo Suárez Salvia

The Embassy of Argentina in Beijing (Spanish: Embajada de la República Argentina en Pekín; Chinese: 阿根廷驻华大使馆; pinyin: āgēntíng zhùhuá dàshǐguǎn) is Argentina's main foreign mission in the People's Republic of China. It is located at Sanlitun, Chaoyang District in Beijing, the capital of the PRC. Since June 21, 2021, Sabino Vaca Narvaja as has served as Argentinian Ambassador to China.

Besides the PRC, the jurisdiction of the embassy covers also Mongolia.
