= Joseph Alcamo =

US environmental scientist (born 1951)

Joseph Alcamo (born 1951) is a U.S. environmental scientist who served as Chief Scientist of the United Nations Environment Programme (UNEP) from 2009 to 2013.

== Career ==
Alcamo received a bachelor's degree in civil engineering in 1973 and a master's degree in environmental engineering from Manhattan College, and earned his PhD for civil-environmental engineering at the University of California. From 1973 to 1980, he worked as an environmental engineer in the private sector, before changing to the Lawrence Berkeley National Laboratory in 1981 and from there to the International Institute for Applied Systems Analysis in Austria in 1982. From 1992 to 1996, Alcamo worked at the Netherlands National Institute for Public Health and the Environment.

Starting in 1996, Alcamo was a professor at University of Kassel in Germany, working as the head of the university's Center for Environmental Systems Research. In 1998, Alcamo was awarded the Max Planck Research Prize for physics and geoscience, in honor of his contributions to global modeling, and the use of global models in international policy.

Alcamo took a temporary leave of absence from the institute, in order to work as the Chief Scientist for UNEP until 2013.

In 2014, he was named as a Special Advisor to the UNFCCC Executive Secretary. He has led the Sussex Sustainability Research Programme since early 2017.

== Research ==
Alcamo published numerous articles and books about environmental subjects, many of them focussing on the modeling of environmental changes and the effects of global warming.
