= Luis María Kreckler =

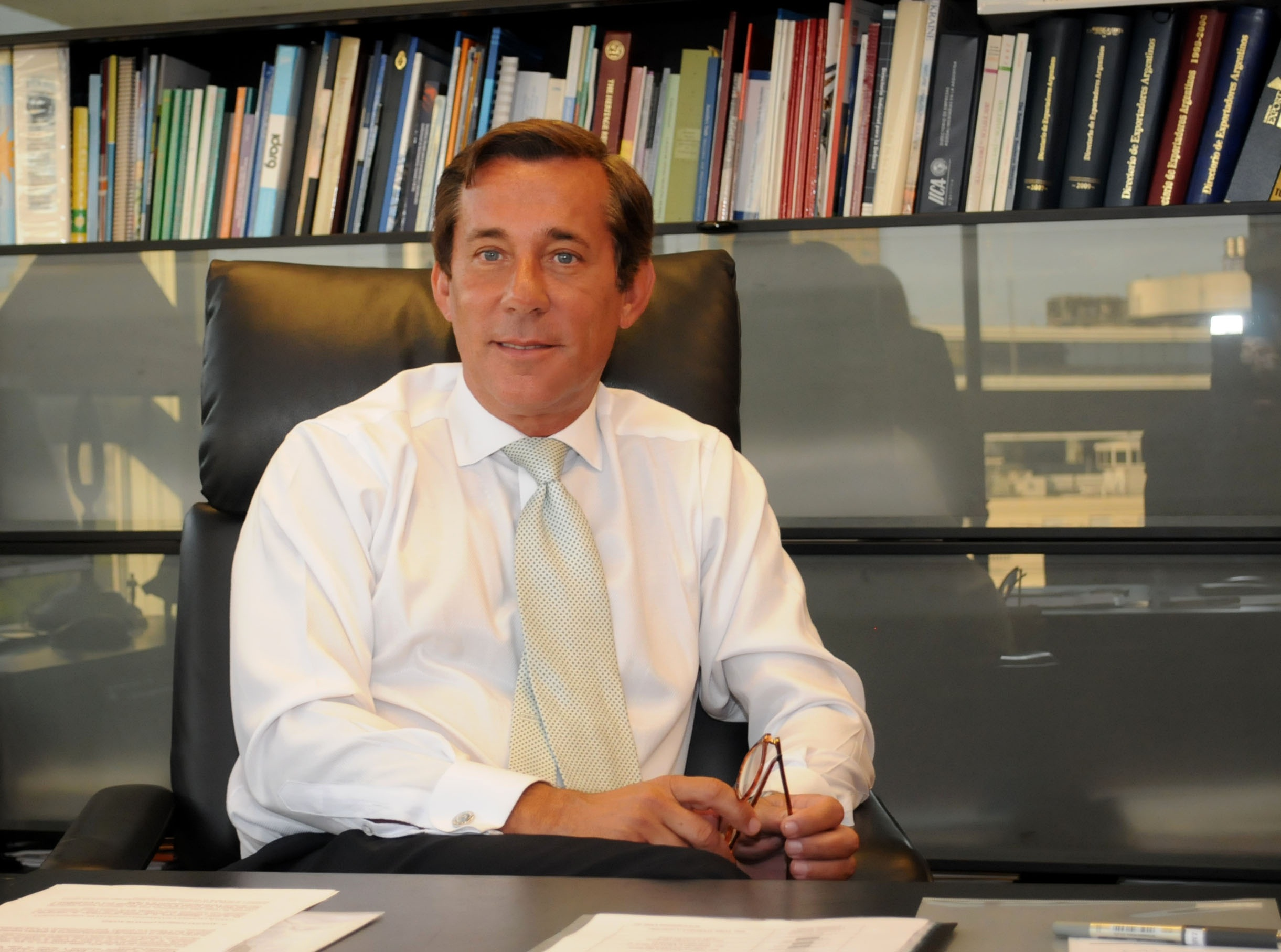
Luis María Kreckler

Luis María Kreckler (born August 16, 1954) is an Argentine diplomat who served as ambassador of his country to the Federative Republic of Brazil between 2012 and 2015. A career diplomat, he previously served as Secretary of Trade and International Economic Relations (2010-2011) and Undersecretary for International Trade (2005-2010) at the Ministry of Foreign Affairs and Worship of Argentina. In 2016 he was appointed ambassador to Germany.

== Career ==
Between 1986 and 1990, Kreckler was Alternate Representative to the Organization of American States. In 1990 he was appointed Argentine consul to Panama. Between 1996 and 1998 he was Chief of Staff of the Secretary of Foreign and Latin American Affairs, before being appointed Consul General and Director of Trade Promotion Center of Argentina in Los Angeles, United States of America.

In 2005 he returned to Argentina as Undersecretary for International Trade of Argentina Chancellery. In 2006 he was promoted to the rank of Ambassador Extraordinary and Plenipotentiary with the agreement of the Senate of the Nation Argentina.

In August 2010 he was appointed Secretary of Trade and International Economic Relations, also taking over as National Coordinator of the Common Market Group (GMC) and Mercosur as Chief Negotiator by Argentina in the Mercosur negotiations - European Union.

On November 7, 2011, President Cristina Fernandez de Kirchner appointed him Ambassador of the Argentina Republic to the Federative Republic of Brazil. That same day, the Brazilian government recognized his appointment.

On February 23, 2012, Kreckler presented his credentials to Brazilian President Dilma Rousseff, in a ceremony held at the Itamaraty Palace in Brasilia.

== Personal life ==
Kreckler is married and has four children. He received a degree in sociology from the University of Buenos Aires, and entered the Foreign Service in 1983.

== Gallery ==
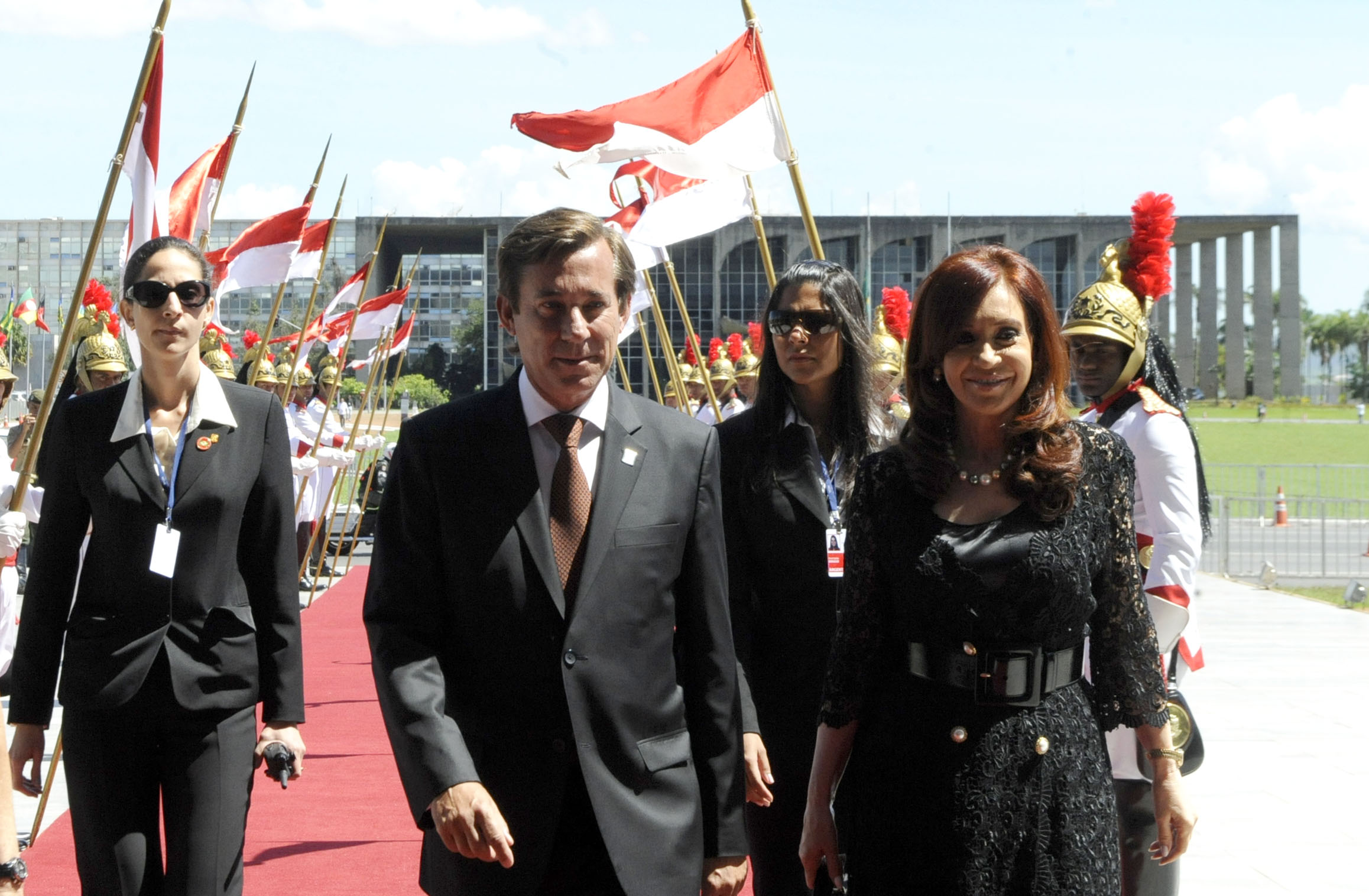
Presidenta Cristina Fernández de Kirchner and Ambassador Kreckler - Palacio Itamaraty

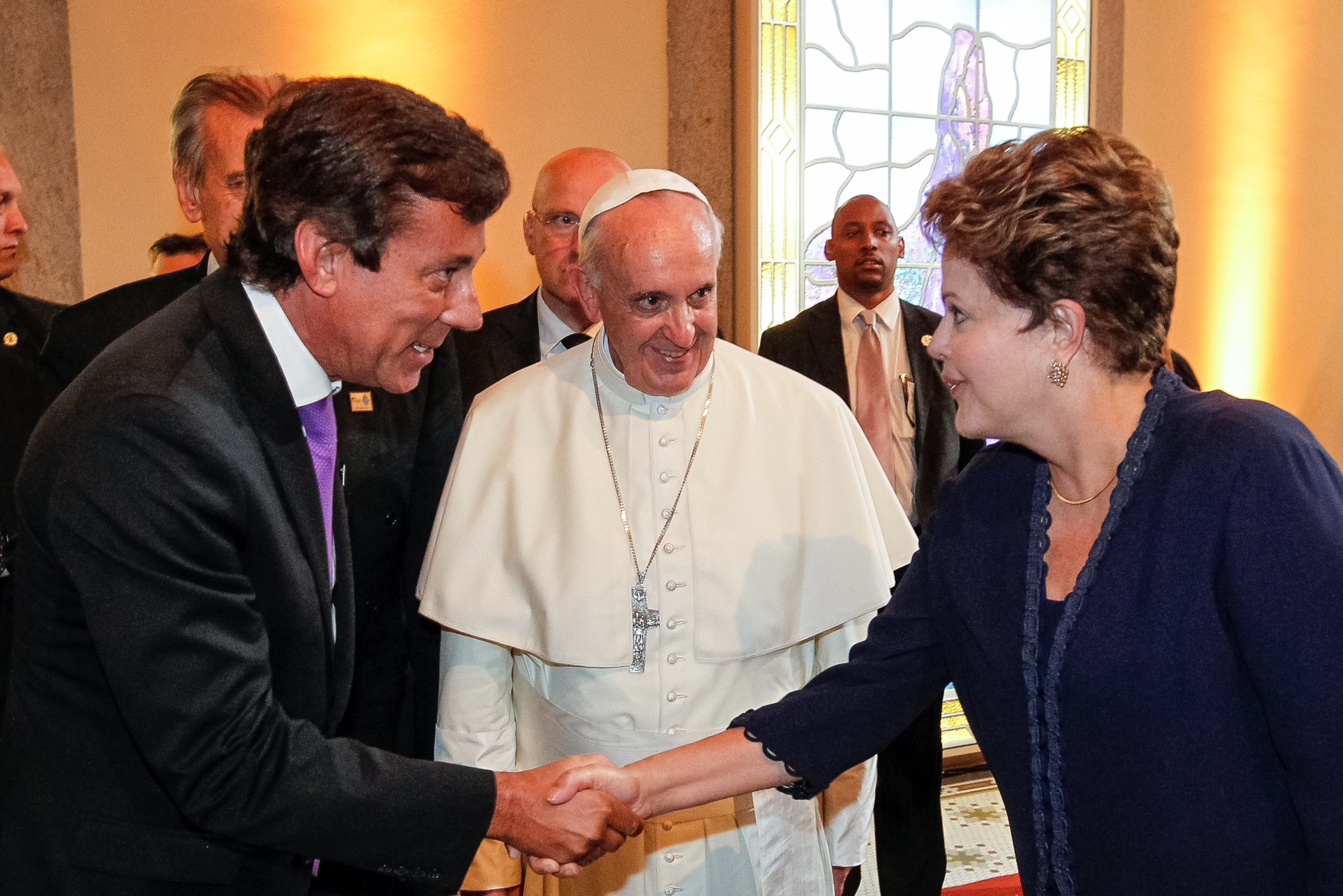
Pope Francis, Dilma Rousseff and Luis María Kreckler

== Decorations received ==
- Order of Merit in the Grade of Grand Cross, awarded by the Lady President of the Republic of Chile, Da. Michelle Bachelet. September 2010.
- Distinguished Order of Merit in the degree of Great Cross, granted by the President of the Republic of Peru, Alan Garcia, July 2010 Services.
- Grand Cross of the Order of Civil Merit by King Juan Carlos I, King of Spain.
- National Order of Merit in the rank of Knight, granted by the French Republic.
- Cross of Merit in the rank of Knight, granted by the Federal Republic of Germany.
- Vasco Nunez de Balboa Order, in the rank of Commander, granted by the Republic of Panama.

== Books and articles published ==
- April 2012: "Malvinas: no Atlântico Sul colonial enclave". Folha de Sao Paulo, Brazil.
- September 2011: "Production Integration in Mercosur: a strategic commitment". Spanish Agency for International Cooperation for Development (IACD).
- January 2011: "The relationship with the giant. The Argentine trade link with China diversifies ". Newsweek Argentina, Buenos Aires.
- December 2010: "Argentina is on the Russian market". The Federal. Buenos Aires, Argentina.
- October 2010: "If we overcome the challenges there will be agreement with the EU in mid-2011". Argentine time. Buenos Aires, Argentina.
- September 2010: "A step forward in the development of investment." El Cronista. Buenos Aires, Argentina.
- August 1997: "Business Diplomacy," Editorial Abaco, Buenos Aires, Argentina.
- January 1997: "Mexico-Mercosur: An approach from the Mexico-Argentina," Editorial Águila y Sol, Buenos Aires.
