= List of ministers of foreign affairs and worship =

Minister of Foreign Affairs, International Trade and Worship of Argentina
- Ministero de Relaciones Exteriores, Comercio Internacional y Culto
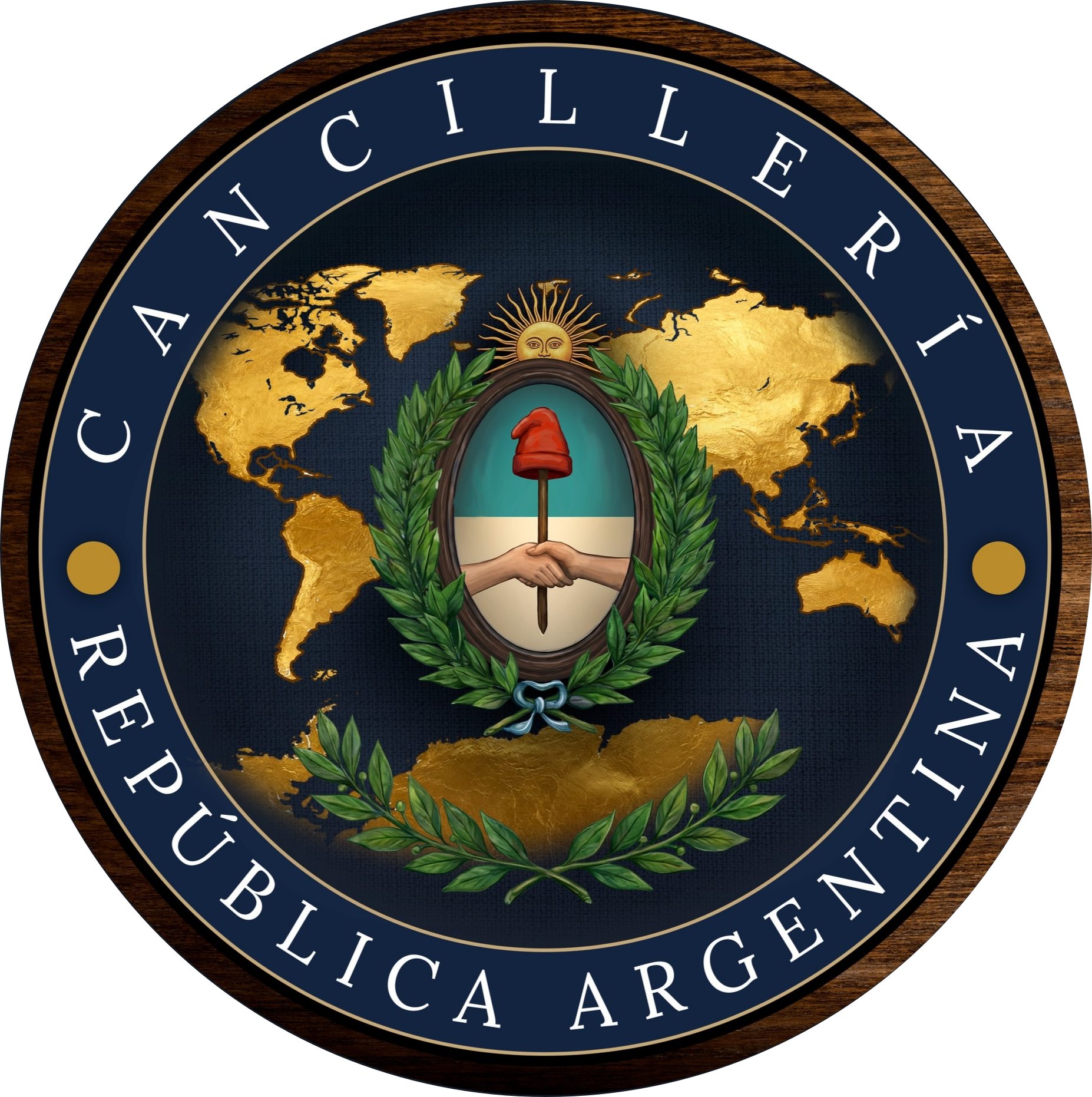

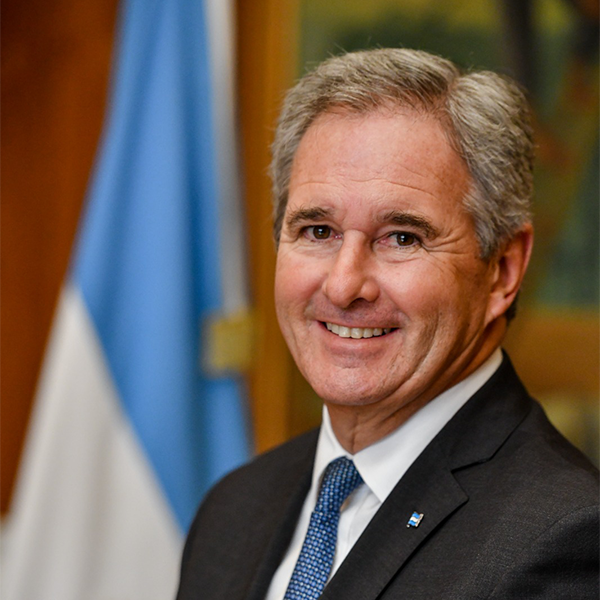
- Incumbent; Pablo Quirno since 23 October 2025
- Ministry of Foreign Affairs, International Trade and Worship
- Style: Excelentísimo Señor (m); Excelentísima Señora (f)
- Member of: Cabinet of Argentina
- Reports to: President of Argentina
- Seat: Edificio Cancillería, Buenos Aires
- Appointer: President of Argentina
- Term length: No fixed term At the President's behest
- Constituting instrument: Law on Ministries
- Inaugural holder: Bernardino Rivadavia
- Formation: 5 February 1822; 204 years ago
- Salary: $ 312,646.14 annually (2020)
- Website: cancilleria.gob.ar/

This is the list of all the ministers of foreign affairs, international trade and worship of the Argentine Republic (Spanish: Ministro de Relaciones Exteriores, Comercio Internacional y Culto) since 1822. The Minister presides over the Ministry of Foreign Affairs and Worship, the country's supreme authority on international relations and part of the Cabinet of Argentina. In a similar fashion to other South America nations, the Minister of Foreign Affairs is generally styled as Chancellor (Canciller). The current Minister is Gerardo Werthein, who serves in President Javier Milei's cabinet.

== List ==
No.	Minister	Party	Term	President
Ministry of Foreign Affairs of the Province of Buenos Aires (1822–1826)
–	Bernardino Rivadavia	Unitarian Party	5 February 1822 – 24 May 1824	Government Junta
–	Manuel José García	Independent	24 May 1824 – 10 February 1826	Government Junta
Ministry of Foreign Affairs of the United Provinces of the Río de la Plata (1826–1831)
–	Francisco F. de la Cruz	Unitarian Party	10 February 1826 – 27 June 1827	Bernardino Rivadavia
–	Manuel Dorrego	Federalist Party	13 August 1827 – 1 December 1828	Vicente López y Planes
Ministry of Foreign Affairs (1853–1898)
1	Juan María Gutiérrez	Independent	5 March 1854 – 1 August 1856	Justo José de Urquiza
2	Bernabé López	Unitarian Party	1 August 1856 – 30 September 1858	Justo José de Urquiza
3	Luis José de la Peña	Independent	30 September 1858 – 5 March 1860	Justo José de Urquiza
4	Emilio de Alvear	Independent	5 March 1860 – 14 December 1860	Santiago Derqui
5	Francisco Pico Jr.	Unitarian Party	14 December 1860 – 6 February 1861	Santiago Derqui
5	Nicanor Molinas	Independent	6 February 1861 – 3 July 1861	Santiago Derqui
6	José Severo de Olmos	Independent	3 July 1861 – 5 November 1861	Santiago Derqui
7	Rufino de Elizalde	Nationalist Party	12 October 1862 – 6 December 1867	Bartolomé Mitre
8	Marcelino Ugarte	Nationalist Party	6 December 1867 – 25 January 1868	Bartolomé Mitre
9	Rufino de Elizalde	Nationalist Party	25 January 1868 – 12 October 1868	Bartolomé Mitre
10	Mariano Varela	Independent	12 October 1868 – 17 August 1870	Domingo Sarmiento
11	Carlos Tejedor	Independent	17 August 1870 – 12 October 1874	Domingo Sarmiento
12	Pedro A. Pardo	Independent	12 October 1874 – 2 August 1875	Nicolás Avellaneda
13	Bernardo de Irigoyen	National Autonomist Party	2 August 1875 – 2 October 1877	Nicolás Avellaneda
14	Rufino de Elizalde	National Autonomist Party	2 October 1877 – 8 May 1878	Nicolás Avellaneda
15	Manuel Montes de Oca	Independent	8 May 1878 – 6 September 1879	Nicolás Avellaneda
16	Domingo Sarmiento	Independent	6 September 1879 – 9 October 1879	Nicolás Avellaneda
17	Lucas González	Independent	9 October 1879 – 7 June 1880	Nicolás Avellaneda
18	Benjamín Zorrilla	National Autonomist Party	7 June 1880 – 12 October 1880	Nicolás Avellaneda
19	Bernardo de Irigoyen	National Autonomist Party	12 October 1880 – 11 February 1882	Julio Argentino Roca
20	Victorino de la Plaza	National Autonomist Party	11 February 1882 – 25 October 1883	Julio Argentino Roca
21	Francisco J. Ortíz	National Autonomist Party	25 October 1883 – 12 October 1886	Julio Argentino Roca
22	Norberto Quirno Costa	National Autonomist Party	12 October 1886 – 27 August 1889	Miguel Juárez Celman
23	Estanislao Zeballos	National Autonomist Party	10 September 1889 – 12 April 1890	Miguel Juárez Celman
24	Roque Sáenz Peña	National Autonomist Party	12 April 1890 – 6 August 1890	Miguel Juárez Celman
25	Eduardo Costa	National Autonomist Party	7 August 1890 – 22 October 1891	Carlos Pellegrini
26	Estanislao Zeballos	National Autonomist Party	22 October 1891 – 12 October 1892	Carlos Pellegrini
27	Tomás S. de Anchorena	National Autonomist Party	12 October 1892 – 1 May 1893	Luis Sáenz Peña
28	Amancio Alcorta	National Autonomist Party	1 May 1893 – 7 June 1893	Luis Sáenz Peña
29	Miguel Cané	National Autonomist Party	7 June 1893 – 27 June 1893	Luis Sáenz Peña
30	Norberto Quirno Costa	National Autonomist Party	27 June 1893 – 5 July 1893	Luis Sáenz Peña
33	Valentín Virasoro	National Autonomist Party	5 July 1893 – 16 December 1893	Luis Sáenz Peña
34	Eduardo Costa	National Autonomist Party	16 December 1893 – 23 January 1895	Luis Sáenz Peña
35	Amancio Alcorta	National Autonomist Party	23 January 1895 – 12 October 1898	José Evaristo Uriburu
Ministry of Foreign Affairs and Worship (1898–1993)
35	Amancio Alcorta	National Autonomist Party		
35	Amancio Alcorta	National Autonomist Party	12 October 1898 – 21 January 1899	Julio Argentino Roca
36	Felipe Yofre	National Autonomist Party	21 January 1899 – 7 May 1902	Julio Argentino Roca
37	Luis María Drago	National Autonomist Party	9 May 1902 – 18 July 1903	Julio Argentino Roca
38	José A. Terry	National Autonomist Party	20 July 1903 – 12 October 1904	Julio Argentino Roca
39	Carlos Rodríguez Larreta	National Autonomist Party	12 October 1904 – 12 March 1906	Manuel Quintana
40	Manuel Montes de Oca	National Autonomist Party	12 March 1906 – 21 November 1906	José Figueroa Alcorta
41	Estanislao Zeballos	National Autonomist Party	21 November 1906 – 21 June 1908	José Figueroa Alcorta
42	Victorino de la Plaza	National Autonomist Party	22 June 1908 – 9 August 1910	José Figueroa Alcorta
43	Carlos Rodríguez Larreta	National Autonomist Party	9 August 1910 – 12 October 1910	José Figueroa Alcorta
44	Epifanio Portela	National Autonomist Party	12 October 1910 – 17 December 1910	Roque Sáenz Peña
45	Ernesto Bosch	Independent	17 December 1910 – 16 February 1914	Roque Sáenz Peña
46	José Luis Murature	National Autonomist Party	16 February 1914 – 9 August 1914	Roque Sáenz Peña
46	José Luis Murature	National Autonomist Party	9 August 1914 – 12 October 1916	Victorino de la Plaza
48	Carlos Becú	Radical Civic Union	12 October 1916 – 30 January 1917	Hipólito Yrigoyen
49	Honorio Pueyrredón	Radical Civic Union	30 January 1917 – 12 October 1922	Hipólito Yrigoyen
50	Ángel Gallardo	Radical Civic Union	12 October 1922 – 12 October 1928	Marcelo T. de Alvear
51	Horacio Oyhanarte	Radical Civic Union	12 October 1928 – 6 September 1930	Hipólito Yrigoyen
52	Ernesto Bosch	Independent	6 September 1930 – 9 October 1931	José Félix Uriburu
53	Adolfo Bioy Domecq	Independent	9 October 1931 – 20 February 1932	José Félix Uriburu
54	Carlos Saavedra Lamas	National Democratic Party	20 February 1932 – 20 February 1938	Agustín Pedro Justo
55	José María Cantilo	Radical Civic Union	20 February 1938 – 2 September 1940	Roberto M. Ortiz
56	Julio A. Pascual Roca	National Democratic Party	20 February 1938 – 2 September 1940	Roberto M. Ortiz
57	Guillermo Rothe	National Democratic Party	28 January 1941 – 13 June 1941	Roberto M. Ortiz
58	Enrique Ruiz Guiñazú	Independent	13 June 1941 – 27 June 1942	Roberto M. Ortiz
58	Enrique Ruiz Guiñazú	Independent	27 June 1942 – 4 June 1943	Ramón Castillo
59	Segundo Storni	Independent (Military)	7 June 1943 – 9 September 1943	Pedro Pablo Ramírez
60	Alberto Gilbert	Independent (Military)	10 September 1943 – 21 October 1943	Pedro Pablo Ramírez
61	Diego I. Mason	Independent (Military)	22 February 1944 – 2 May 1944	Edelmiro Farrell
62	Orlando L. Peluffo	Independent (Military)	2 May 1944 – 15 January 1945	Edelmiro Farrell
63	César Ameghino	Independent	18 January 1945 – 27 August 1945	Edelmiro Farrell
64	Juan Isaac Cooke	Radical Civic Union	27 August 1945 – 4 June 1946	Edelmiro Farrell
65	Juan Atilio Bramuglia	Peronist Party	4 June 1946 – 11 August 1949	Juan Domingo Perón
66	Hipólito Jesús Paz	Peronist Party	13 August 1949 – 28 June 1951	Juan Domingo Perón
67	Jerónimo Remorino	Peronist Party	28 June 1951 – 25 August 1955	Juan Domingo Perón
68	Ildefonso Cavagna Martínez	Peronist Party	25 August 1955 – 22 September 1955	Juan Domingo Perón
69	Mario Amadeo	Independent	22 September 1955 – 13 November 1955	Eduardo Lonardi
70	Luis Podestá Costa	Independent	13 November 1955 – 25 January 1957	Pedro Eugenio Aramburu
71	Alfonso de Laferrère	Independent	30 January 1957 – 13 January 1958	Pedro Eugenio Aramburu
72	Alejandro Ceballos	Independent	29 January 1958 – 1 May 1958	Pedro Eugenio Aramburu
73	Carlos Florit	Radical Civic Union	1 May 1958 – 15 May 1959	Arturo Frondizi
74	Diógenes Taboada	Radical Civic Union	22 May 1959 – 28 April 1961	Arturo Frondizi
75	Adolfo Mugica	National Democratic Party	28 April 1961 – 29 August 1961	Arturo Frondizi
76	Miguel Ángel Cárcano	Radical Civic Union	29 August 1961 – 12 September 1961	Arturo Frondizi
77	Roberto Etchepareborda	Radical Civic Union	12 September 1961 – 29 March 1962	Arturo Frondizi
77	Roberto Etchepareborda	Radical Civic Union	29 March 1962 – 5 April 1962	José María Guido
78	Mariano José Drago	Independent	5 April 1962 – 30 April 1962	José María Guido
79	Bonifacio del Carril	Independent	30 April 1962 – 5 October 1962	José María Guido
80	Carlos Manuel Muñiz	Independent	5 October 1962 – 14 May 1963	José María Guido
81	Juan Carlos Cordini	Independent	14 May 1963 – 12 October 1963	José María Guido
82	Miguel Ángel Zavala Ortiz	Radical Civic Union	12 October 1963 – 28 June 1966	Arturo Illia
83	Nicanor Costa Méndez	Independent	28 June 1966 – 16 June 1969	Juan Carlos Onganía
84	Juan B. Martín	Independent	16 June 1969 – 18 June 1970	Juan Carlos Onganía
85	Luis M. de Pablo Pardo	Independent	18 June 1970 – 22 March 1971	Roberto M. Levingston
85	Luis M. de Pablo Pardo	Independent	22 March 1971 – 22 June 1972	Alejandro Lanusse
86	Eduardo Mc Loughlin	Independent (Military)	22 June 1972 – 25 May 1973	Alejandro Lanusse
87	Juan Carlos Puig	Justicialist Party	25 May 1973 – 13 July 1973	Héctor Cámpora
88	Alberto Vignes	Justicialist Party	13 July 1973 – 12 October 1973	Raúl Lastiri
88	Alberto Vignes	Justicialist Party	12 October 1973 – 1 July 1974	Juan Domingo Perón
88	Alberto Vignes	Justicialist Party	1 July 1974 – 11 August 1975	Isabel Perón
89	Ángel Federico Robledo	Justicialist Party	11 August 1975 – 16 September 1975	Isabel Perón
90	Manuel Aráuz Castex	Justicialist Party	16 September 1975 – 14 January 1976	Isabel Perón
91	Raúl Alberto Quijano	Justicialist Party	14 January 1976 – 24 March 1976	Isabel Perón
92	César Augusto Guzzetti	Independent (Military)	24 March 1976 – 23 May 1977	Jorge Rafael Videla
93	Oscar Antonio Montes	Independent (Military)	23 May 1977 – 27 October 1978	Jorge Rafael Videla
94	Carlos Washington Pastor	Independent (Military)	5 November 1978 – 29 March 1981	Jorge Rafael Videla
95	Oscar Camilión	MID	29 March 1981 – 12 December 1981	Roberto Viola
96	Norberto Couto	Independent (Military)	12 December 1981 – 22 December 1981	Carlos Lacoste
97	Nicanor Costa Méndez	Independent	22 December 1981 – 2 July 1982	Leopoldo Galtieri
98	Juan R. Aguirre Lanari	Corrientes Liberal Party	2 July 1982 – 10 December 1983	Reynaldo Bignone
99	Dante Caputo	Radical Civic Union	10 December 1983 – 26 May 1989	Raúl Alfonsín
100	Susana Ruiz Cerutti	Radical Civic Union	26 May 1989 – 8 July 1989	Raúl Alfonsín
101	Domingo Cavallo	Justicialist Party	8 July 1989 – 31 January 1991	Carlos Menem
102	Guido di Tella	Justicialist Party	31 January 1991 – 13 January 1993	Carlos Menem
Ministry of Foreign Affairs, International Trade and Worship (1993–2010)
102	Guido di Tella	Justicialist Party	13 January 1993 – 10 December 1999	Carlos Menem
103	Adalberto Rodríguez Giavarini	Radical Civic Union	10 December 1999 – 21 December 2001	Fernando de la Rúa
103	Adalberto Rodríguez Giavarini	Radical Civic Union	21 December 2001 – 23 December 2001	Ramón Puerta
104	José María Vernet	Justicialist Party	23 December 2001 – 3 January 2002	Adolfo Rodríguez Saá
105	Carlos Ruckauf	Justicialist Party	3 January 2002 – 25 May 2003	Eduardo Duhalde
106	Rafael Bielsa	Justicialist Party	25 May 2003 – 3 December 2005	Néstor Kirchner
107	Jorge Taiana	Justicialist Party	3 December 2005 – 10 December 2007	Néstor Kirchner
107	Jorge Taiana	Justicialist Party	10 December 2007 – 18 June 2010	Cristina Fernández de Kirchner
Ministry of Foreign Affairs and Worship (2010–2019)
108	Héctor Timerman	Justicialist Party	18 June 2010 – 10 December 2015	Cristina Fernández de Kirchner
109	Susana Malcorra	Radical Civic Union	10 December 2015 – 12 June 2017	Mauricio Macri
110	Jorge Faurie	Independent	12 June 2017 – 10 December 2019	Mauricio Macri
Ministry of Foreign Affairs, International Trade and Worship (2019–present)
111	Felipe Solá	Justicialist Party	10 December 2019 – 20 September 2021	Alberto Fernández
112	Santiago Cafiero	Justicialist Party	20 September 2021 – 10 December 2023	Alberto Fernández
113	Diana Mondino	Independent	10 December 2023 – 30 October 2024	Javier Milei
114	Gerardo Werthein	Independent	30 October 2024 – 22 October 2025	Javier Milei
115	Pablo Quirno	Independent	23 October 2025 – present	Javier Milei

== See also ==
- Ministry of Foreign Affairs, International Trade and Worship
