= Susana Ruiz Cerutti =

Argentine lawyer, diplomat and politician (1940–2024)

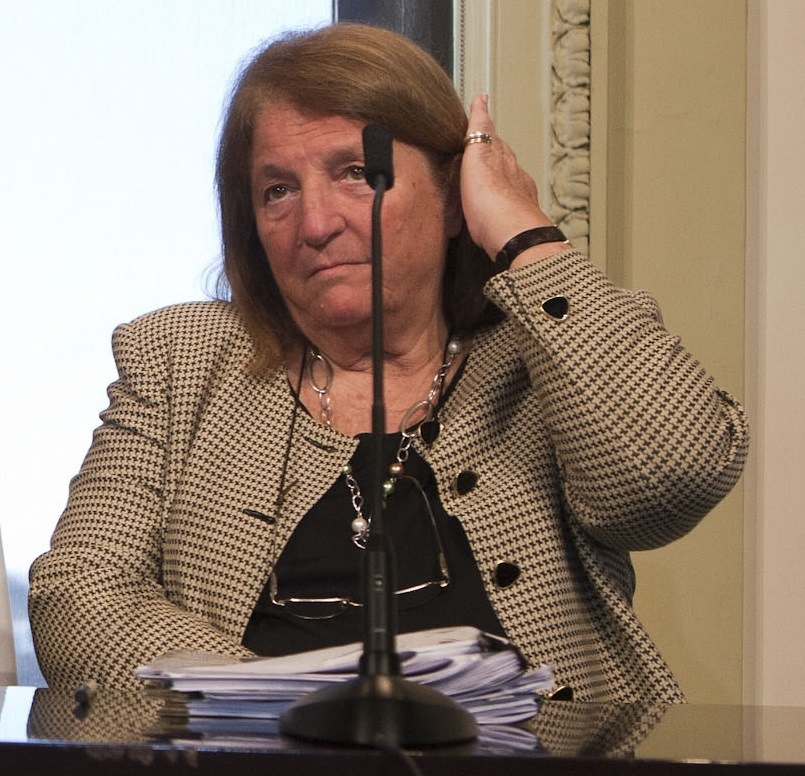
- Cerutti in 2014

Minister of Foreign Affairs
- In office 26 May 1989 – 8 July 1989
- President: Raúl Alfonsín
- Preceded by: Dante Caputo
- Succeeded by: Domingo Cavallo

Ambassador to Switzerland and Liechtenstein
- In office 1989–1996
- President: Carlos Menem
- Preceded by: Enrique Quintana
- Succeeded by: Guillermo Enrique González

Ambassador to Canada
- In office 1998–1999
- President: Carlos Menem

Personal details
- Born: 18 November 1940 Buenos Aires, Argentina
- Died: 24 June 2024 (aged 83) Buenos Aires, Argentina
- Party: Radical Civic Union
- Education: University of Buenos Aires; Instituto del Servicio Exterior de la Nación
- Profession: Diplomat, lawyer
- Awards: Konex Prize (1998); Konex Platinum Award (2008)

Susana Myrta Ruiz Cerutti (18 November 1940 – 24 June 2024) was an Argentine lawyer, diplomat, and politician, who occupied the position of Minister of Foreign Affairs and Worship (canciller) during the presidency of Raúl Alfonsín, from 26 May to 8 July 1989. This made her the first woman in Argentina's history to reach the post of foreign minister. She had previously served as deputy foreign minister from 1987 to 1989, when she became foreign minister and later held other positions in that Ministry. During her diplomatic career, she was also Argentine ambassador to Switzerland, Liechtenstein, and Canada.

== Education and early career ==
Having graduated in law from the University of Buenos Aires (UBA), Ruiz Cerutti practised her profession until her entry to the Instituto del Servicio Exterior de la Nación, from which she graduated in 1968 with a gold medal and Honours diploma.

== Diplomatic career ==
Between 1972 and 1985, Ruiz Cerutti led or took part in several diplomatic missions that resolved the Beagle Channel dispute through papal mediation. She was Argentina's permanent representative at the United Nations and the Organization of American States (OAS), and represented Argentina in other organizations. She also headed the Argentinian delegation in negotiations with Chile over boundary issues stemming from the Laguna del Desierto incident.

After serving as legal advisor to Argentina's Foreign Ministry, in 1987, she was appointed Secretary of State (vicanciller – "vicechancellor", Deputy Foreign Minister). In May 1989, she was appointed by President Raúl Alfonsín, as Foreign Minister (canciller – "chancellor"), in place of Dante Caputo. She held that position for 6 weeks, until the inauguration of President Carlos Menem, who appointed Domingo Cavallo as her successor on 9 July.

Ruiz Cerutti then resumed the post of Secretary of State until 1991, when she was appointed Argentine Ambassador to Switzerland, as her credentials were accepted in Liechtenstein. Later, she was appointed Ambassador to Canada from 1998 to 1999. Between 1999 and 2000, she was Special Representative for the Islas Malvinas (Falkland Islands) and Southern Atlantic Islands affairs, with the rank of ambassador. In November 2000, she was appointed Secretary for Foreign Policy, replacing Enrique Candioti, during the presidency of Fernando de la Rúa.

She was re-appointed Legal Adviser to the Foreign Ministry in 2001, a position she held until her death. In that position, she represented Argentina in the Uruguay River pulp mill dispute when the issue was before the International Court of Justice in The Hague.

She was the candidate favoured by the United Nations Security Council in November 2014 to take a place as judge at the International Court of Justice, but the General Assembly's choice of Patrick Lipton Robinson prevailed in the final vote.

== Personal life ==
Ruiz Cerutti was born on 18 November 1940. She died in Buenos Aires on 24 June 2024, at the age of 83.

== Awards and recognition ==
For her work resolving the "Laguna del Desierto" boundary dispute with Chile, Ruiz Cerutti was awarded the Pro Ecclesia et Pontifice (1985), and the Order of St. Gregory the Great (1996) from Pope John Paul II.

She twice won the Konex Award, in 1998 and 2008, in the "Diplomacy" category.

In April 2012, she was appointed Honorary Member of the Argentine National Academy of Geography, lecturing on "Geography in disputes between states", bringing to bear her expertise in international law.

Additional foreign honours include:

- Grand Cross of Hungary (1988)
- Grand Cross of the Order of Río Branco of Brazil (1989)
- Order of Merit of the Italian Republic – Grand Officer (2001)
- Gold Medal of Merit of Serbia (10 December 2019) for the "defence of the principles of international law and the territorial integrity of Serbia".

== See also ==
- List of ministers of foreign affairs and worship
