= Juan Ramón Aguirre Lanari =

Argentine lawyer, diplomat, politician and professor

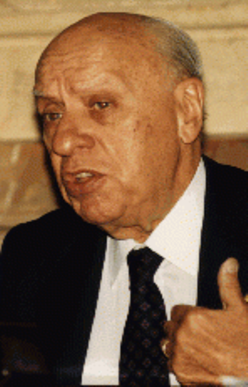
- Juan Ramón Aguirre Lanari Senador

Minister of Foreign Affairs of Argentina
- In office July 2, 1982 – December 10, 1983
- President: Reynaldo Bignone
- Preceded by: Nicanor Costa Méndez
- Succeeded by: Dante Caputo

Personal details
- Born: August 20, 1920
- Died: December 12, 2017 (aged 97); Buenos Aires, Argentina

Juan Ramón Aguirre Lanari (August 20, 1920 – December 12, 2017) was an Argentine lawyer, diplomat, politician, and professor of constitutional law, who served as the Minister of Foreign Affairs from 1982 until 1983. Aguirre Lanari was the last Foreign Minister of the National Reorganization Process before the end of Argentina's military dictatorship in 1983. While not a member of the military, Aguirre Lanari saw his 1982 appointment to the Foreign Ministry as a way to guide the dictatorship towards a transition to democracy. He accepted his assignment as Foreign Minister following assurances by President Reynaldo Bignone that new elections would be held by early 1984. Following the defeat of Argentina in the Falklands War and the cessation of hostilities, Aguirre Lanari led international negotiations. He managed to get the United Nations to approve Resolution 37/9 in November 1982, which called on all parties to negotiate a solution to the Falkland Islands crisis.

A member and former leader of the Liberal Party of Corrientes, Aguirre Lanari was elected to the Argentine Senate, representing his native Corrientes Province on three occasions: the 1963 general election, and the 1987 and 1989 elections following the transition to democracy.

Aguirre Lanari died in Buenos Aires on December 12, 2017, at the age of 97.
