= Diana Mondino =

Argentine academic and politician (born 1958)

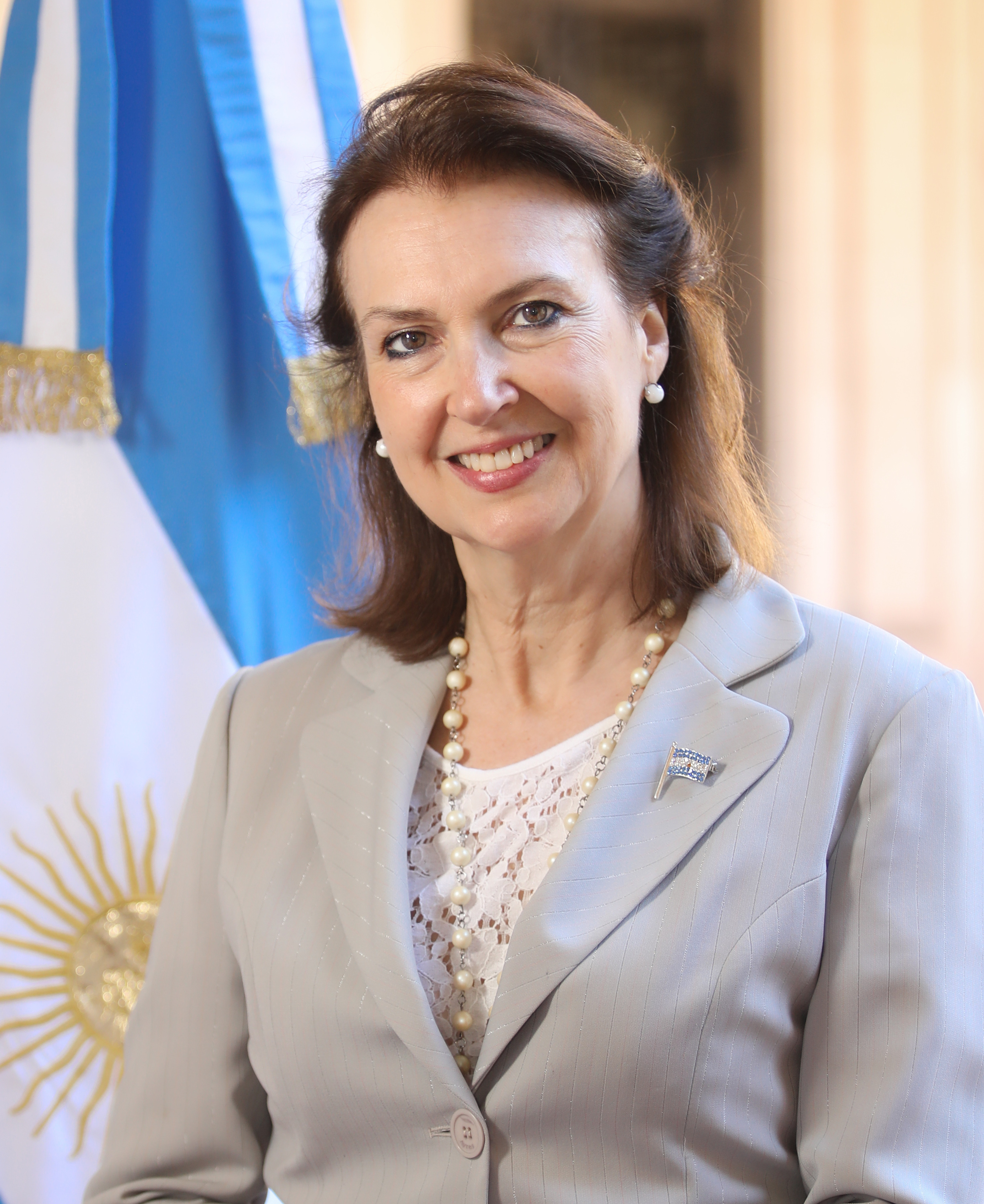
- Official portrait, 2024

Minister of Foreign Affairs, International Trade and Worship
- In office 10 December 2023 – 30 October 2024
- President: Javier Milei
- Preceded by: Santiago Cafiero
- Succeeded by: Gerardo Werthein

Personal details
- Born: 8 August 1958 (age 68) Córdoba, Argentina
- Party: La Libertad Avanza (2023–present)
- Education: National University of Córdoba; University of Navarra; University of CEMA (M.Fin.)

Diana Elena Mondino (Spanish pronunciation: [ˈdjana eˈlena monˈdino]; born 8 August 1958) is an Argentine economist, academic, and politician, formerly serving as the Minister of Foreign Affairs of the Argentine Republic from 2023 to 2024 under President Javier Milei. Mondino was previously the Director of Institutional Affairs at the University of CEMA.

In the 2023 Argentine general election, she was elected as a national deputy for Buenos Aires city for the La Libertad Avanza coalition. She became Foreign Minister on Milei's inauguration on December 10, 2023 and remained the minister until 30 October 2024 after President Javier Milei dismissed her due to Argentina's support for a UN resolution to lift the US embargo on Cuba.

== Early life and career ==
=== Education in Argentina ===
Mondino was born in 1958 in the City of Cordoba, in a family of Piedmontese origins, and attended kindergarten through secondary school at the Juan Zorrilla de San Martín Public School. She studied economics at the National University of Córdoba where she received the gold medal for her academic performance and best grade point average. She also began a Doctorate in Economics at the same university but did not complete the degree due to bureaucratic issues, despite defending her thesis.

=== Life abroad ===
In 1982, Mondino moved to Spain and earned a master’s degree in economics and marketing from IESE Business School at the University of Navarra, graduating in 1986. She later continued her studies in the United States, completing a master’s degree at Columbia Business School in 2001, an executive education program at the Yale School of Management in 2018, and a postgraduate degree in ethics from the Mendoza College of Business at the University of Notre Dame.

She founded Rysk Analysis in 1991, and subsequently worked in various private companies, including Loma Negra, S&P Global Ratings, and Banco Supervielle.

=== Academic career ===
Mondino is a professor of finance at UCEMA, where she teaches in the business administration and marketing undergraduate programs, including courses for international students. She also serves as the university’s director of institutional affairs.

== Political career ==
In 2023, Mondino officially entered politics as a candidate for deputy for La Libertad Avanza (LLA) in the Autonomous City of Buenos Aires. LLA's party list obtained 17.81% of the vote in the PASO and 20.44% in the general elections, with the result that Mondino was elected for the period 2023–2027.

=== Minister of Foreign Affairs ===
Following Javier Milei's election as president, Diana Mondino resigned her seat in the Chamber of Deputies to assume the role of Minister of Foreign Affairs. She was removed from the position by Milei on October 30, 2024, after Argentina supported a non-binding United Nations resolution calling for an end to the United States embargo on Cuba. Former ambassador to the United States, Gerardo Werthein, was appointed as her successor.

== Controversies ==
On October 31, 2023, during an interview with journalist Luis Novaresio on La Nación+, Mondino drew criticism for defending the concept of a market for human organs and for remarks comparing same-sex marriage to personal hygiene choices. She stated that, as a liberal, she supported individual life choices, using an analogy involving lice to illustrate her position.

After a visit to the Espacio Lejano Station, she claimed scientists and soldiers could not be distinguished because "Chinese all look the same".

== Personal life ==
According to her sworn financial disclosure, Diana Mondino reported assets totaling 5.027 billion pesos, making her the wealthiest member of President Javier Milei’s cabinet.

== Electoral history ==
Electoral history of Diana Mondino
Election	Office	List	No.	District	Votes			Result	Ref.
Election	Office	List	No.	District	Total	%	P. (Note: Presented on an electoral list. The data shown represents the share of the vote the entire alliance received in that constituency.)	Result	Ref.
2023	National Deputy	La Libertad Avanza	1	City of Buenos Aires	377,451	20.54%	3rd	Elected (Note: Never took office.)	

Political offices
Preceded by Santiago Cafiero	Minister of Foreign Affairs and Worship; 2023–2024	Succeeded by Gerardo Werthein
