= Amancio =

Amancio Amancio is of Spanish origin, and Amâncio is also Portuguese. It means "lover" and indicates a person with great leadership skills due to their dedication to tasks and companions, as well as their boldness. He very rarely lets an opportunity pass by due to inattention or excessive caution. It has a patronymic origin, derived from the given name Amâncio, which, in turn, comes from the Latin "Amantius," meaning "he who loves" or "lover." It can be found in various regions, with variations such as Amanzo, Amanti, and Amanteo.

Heraldic achievement of Don Amancio

== Places ==
- Amancio, Cuba, a town in Las Tunas province

== People ==
- Amancio Alcorta (1842–1902), Argentine legal theorist
- Amancio Jacinto Alcorta (1805–1862), Argentine composer
- Amancio Amaro (1939–2023), Spanish footballer
- Amancio D'Silva (1936–1996), Indian-born jazz guitarist and composer
- Amancio Guedes (1925–2015), Portuguese architect, sculptor, and painter
- Amancio Ortega (born 1936), Spanish fashion executive and founding chairman of the Inditex
- Amancio Williams (1913–1989), Argentine architect
- Ebert William Amâncio (born 1983), Brazilian footballer better known as Betão
- Amancio Paraschiv (born 1992), Romanian professional welterweight kickboxer and amateur boxer
