= Gerardo Werthein =

Argentine businessman and politician

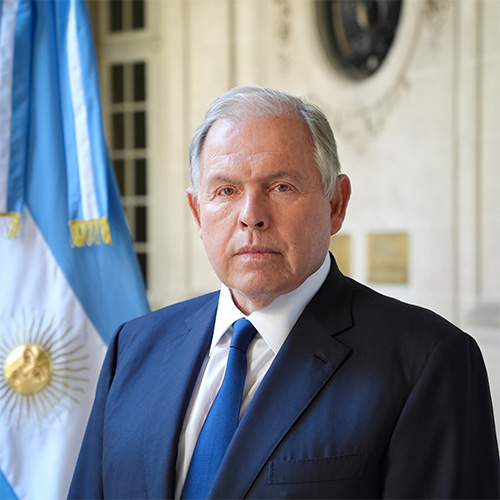
- Official portrait, 2024.

Minister of Foreign Affairs, International Trade and Worship
- In office 30 October 2024 – 22 October 2025
- President: Javier Milei
- Preceded by: Diana Mondino
- Succeeded by: Pablo Quirno

Diplomatic posts
- President: Javier Milei
- 2023–2024: Ambassador to the United States
- Preceded by: Jorge Argüello
- Succeeded by: Alec Oxenford

President of the Argentine Olympic Committee
- In office 15 June 2009 – 4 October 2021
- Preceded by: Alicia Masoni de Morea
- Succeeded by: Mario Moccia

Personal details
- Born: 3 December 1955 (age 70) Buenos Aires, Argentina
- Party: Independent
- Education: University of Buenos Aires
- Occupation: Veterinarian • Politician

Gerardo Werthein (Spanish pronunciation: [xeˈɾaɾðo ˈweɾtejn]; born 3 December 1955) is an Argentine businessman and diplomat who served as the minister of foreign affairs, international trade and worship of Argentina between October 2024 and his resignation in October 2025. He previously served as the ambassador of Argentina to the United States from April to October 2024.

== Early life and career ==
Werthein was born into a Russian family of Jewish origin. His great-grandfather, Leon Werthein, emigrated from Bessarabia to Argentina in 1904 with his wife Ana Jajam and their four children, Gregorio, Elisa, Numo, and Israel, fleeing the persecution of Jewish people by the Russian Empire. The Werthein family began with large-scale livestock operations in Argentina and later established the Werthein Group, a major economic conglomerate that has included ownership of Telecom Argentina.

Werthein served as president of the Argentine Olympic Committee from 2009 to 2021. He has also been a member of the International Olympic Committee (IOC) and the Olympic Broadcasting Services since 2011, joining the IOC Executive Board as an "Executive Member" in 2020. During his tenure as president, Buenos Aires was selected as the host city for the 2018 Summer Youth Olympics, which took place in October of that year.

== Political career ==
=== Ambassador to the United States (2023 -2024) ===
Following Javier Milei's electoral victory in the 2023 Argentine presidential elections, Werthein accompanied Milei on a trip to New York and was present at the meetings Milei held with various figures, including former U.S. President Bill Clinton. After Milei's presidential inauguration, he nominated Werthein as the Argentine ambassador to the United States. His appointment was finally approved by the Argentine Senate on April 18, 2024.

=== Foreign Minister (2024–2025) ===
Werthein was appointed foreign minister by President Milei on 30 October 2024 following the dismissal of Diana Mondino. Wethein's inauguration featured a Torah, on which Werthein swore to uphold his position faithfully.

Werthein resigned on 22 October 2025, less than a week before the midterm election.

Sporting positions
Preceded by (China) Li Xueyong	President of Organizing Committee for Summer Youth Olympic Games; 2018	Succeeded by (Senegal) Mamadou Diagna Ndiaye
Diplomatic posts
Preceded by Jorge Argüello	Argentine Ambassador to the United States; 2023–2024	Succeeded by Alec Oxenford
Political offices
Preceded by Diana Mondino	Minister of Foreign Affairs and Worship; 2024–2025	Succeeded by Pablo Quirno
