= Carlos Washington =

Carlos Washington may refer to:

- Carlos Washington Jr. (born 1998), American football running back
- Carlos Washington Lencinas (1888–1929), Argentine politician
- Carlos Washington Pastor (1924–2012), Argentine Air Force officer
