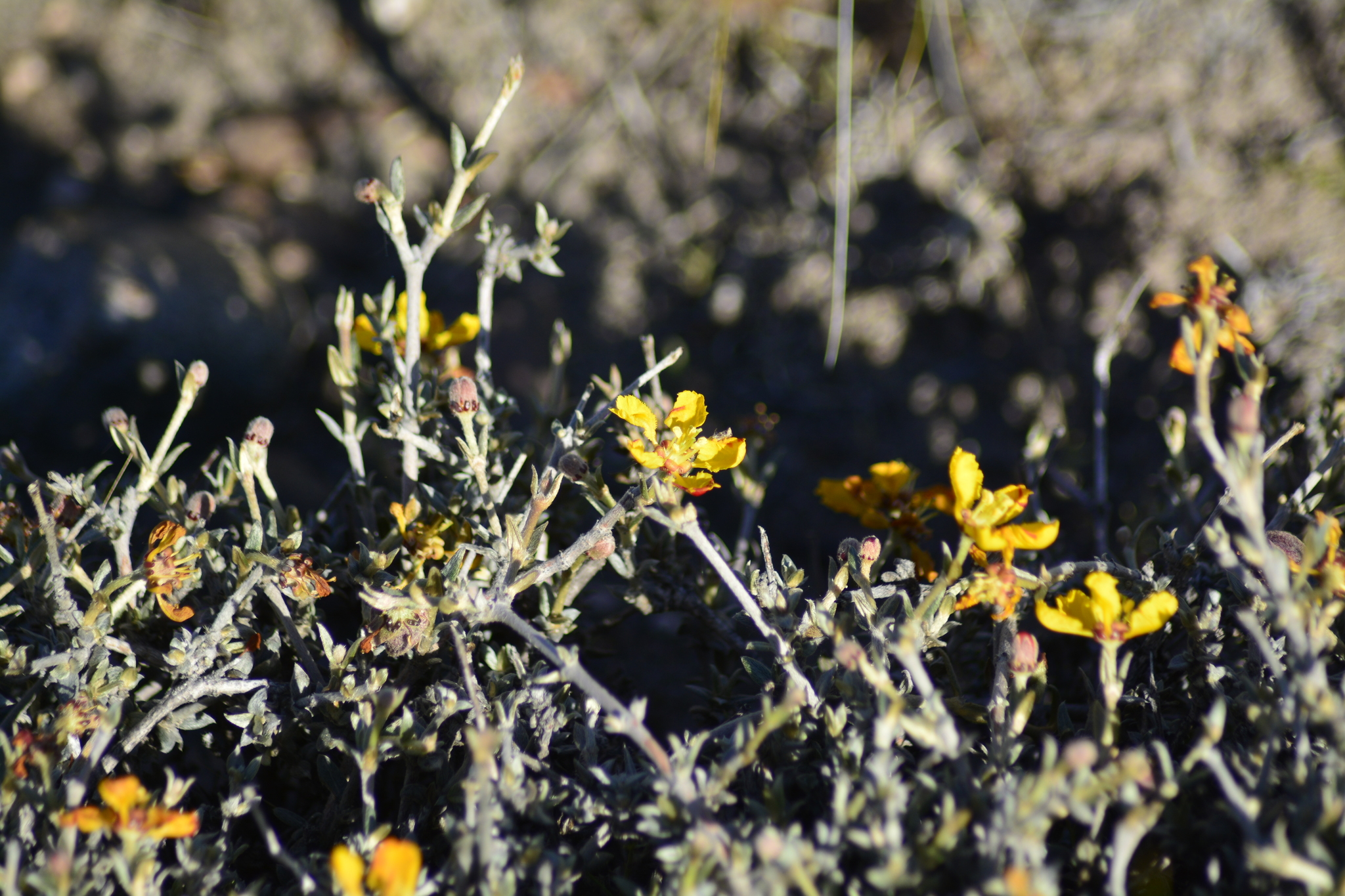

Scientific classification
- Kingdom: Plantae
- Clade: Tracheophytes
- Clade: Angiosperms
- Clade: Eudicots
- Clade: Rosids
- Order: Malpighiales
- Family: Malpighiaceae
- Genus: Mionandra
- Species: M. fischeri

Binomial name
- Mionandra fischeri (Hicken) R.F.Almeida

Synonyms
- Cordobia fischeri (Hicken) Nied.; Gallardoa fischeri Hicken

= Mionandra fischeri =

Genus of plants

Mionandra fischeri is a species of flowering plant belonging to the family Malpighiaceae. It is a shrub native to Argentina, ranging from San Luis to Rio Negro provinces.

The species was first described in 1916 by Cristóbal Mariá Hicken as Gallardoa fischeri, the sole species in genus Gallardoa, in Physis (Buenos Aires) Vol.2 on page 101. The genus was named in honour of Ángel Gallardo (1867–1934), an Argentine civil engineer, natural scientist and politician. In 2023 Rafael Felipe de Almeida placed the species in genus Mionandra as Mionandra fischeri.
