= Ángel Gallardo (civil engineer) =

Argentine civil engineer, natural scientist and politician

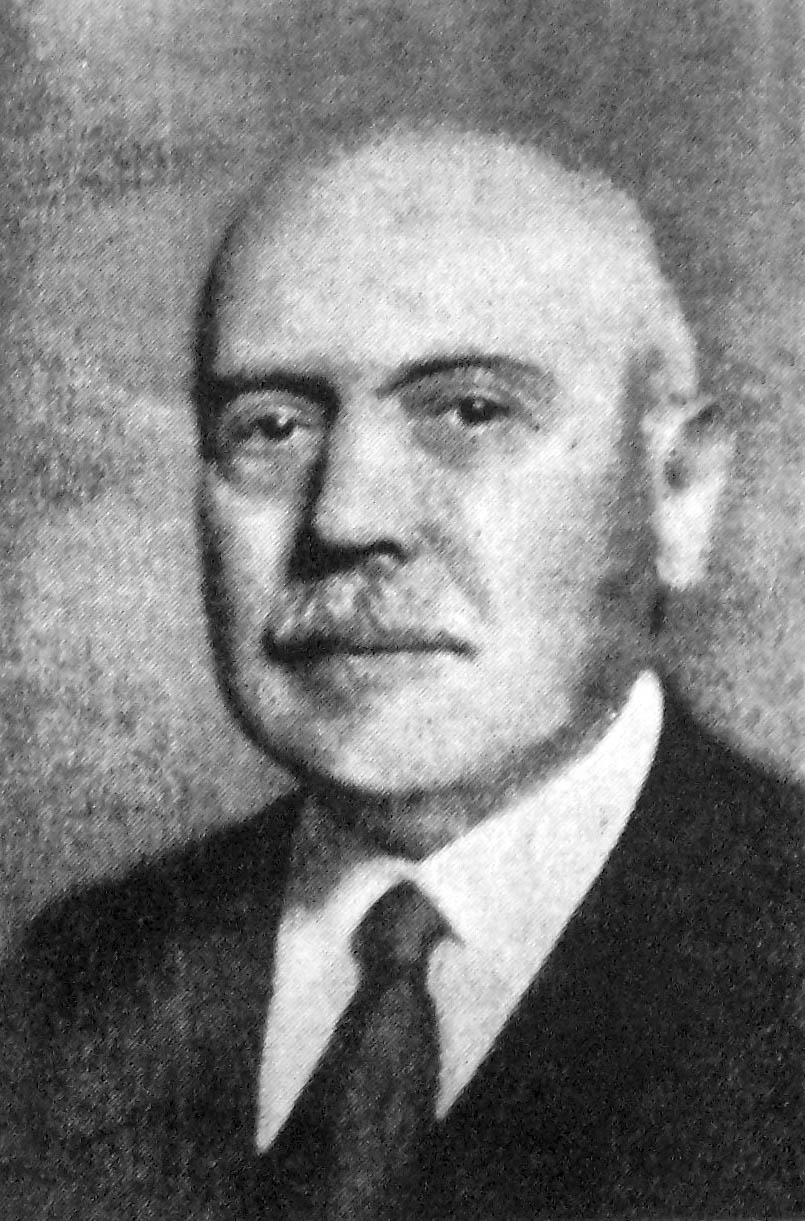

Ángel Gallardo (19 November 1867, in Buenos Aires – 13 May 1934, in Buenos Aires) was an Argentine civil engineer, natural scientist and politician. He served variously as the president of the National Council of Education, the Minister of Foreign Affairs and the Rector of the University of Buenos Aires. He was recognised for his scientific work both in Argentina and abroad.

Gallardo's scientific work dealt with problems of heredity and cell division.

== Early life ==
He graduated from the Colegio Nacional de Buenos Aires in 1887 and received his degree in civil engineering from Facultad de Ciencias Exactas y Naturales (UBA) of the University of Buenos Aires in 1894. However, in addition to civil engineering, beginning in 1892 he studied natural history (biology) under Carlos Berg at the Bernardino Rivadavia Natural Sciences Museum.

A street in Buenos Aires is named after him.

In 1916, botanist Cristóbal Mariá Hicken (1875–1933), named a species of plant from Argentina, after him, Gallardoa.

== Other sources ==
- Fúrlong Cárdiff, Guillermo (1964). Angel Gallardo. Buenos Aires: Ediciones Culturales Argentinas, Ministerio de Educación y Justicio. OCLC 1441945. HathiTrust copy, search only
- "Angel Gallardo". Entomologia Net. Archived from the original on 23 October 2004.
- Giacchino, Adrián (1998). "Breve Biografia de Ángel Gallardo (1867-1934)". Fundación de Historia Natural Félix de Azara (FHN). Archived from the original on 28 March 2007.
