= Mamadou Diagna Ndiaye =

Senegalese sports official (born 1949)

Member of the International Olympic Committee
- Incumbent
- Assumed office 2015

President of the Senegalese National Olympic and Sports Committee
- Incumbent
- Assumed office 2007

Chair of the Dakar Organising Committee for the 2026 Summer Youth Games
- Incumbent
- Assumed office 2019
- Preceded by: Position established

President of the Dakar Organising Committee for the 2026 Summer Youth Olympic Games
- Incumbent
- Assumed office 18 October 2018
- Leader: Thomas Bach; Kirsty Coventry
- Preceded by: Gerardo Werthein (Buenos Aires 2018)

Personal details
- Born: 10 February 1949 (age 77)
- Awards: Commander of the Order of Ouissam Alaouite (2014)

Mamadou Diagna Ndiaye (born 10 February 1949, Senegal) has been a member of the International Olympic Committee (IOC) since 2015.

== Education ==
Ndiaye studied law in Dakar, Paris and Brussels and also attended the CFBP (Professional banking school) in Paris.

== Career ==
After completing his studies, Ndiaye worked as a proxyholder at the National Economic Development Bank in Senegal and was a financial advisor to the Senegalese Embassy in Paris. He was a special advisor to the Secretary General of the Organisation of the Petroleum Exporting Countries (OPEC) in Vienna, as well as to the President of Senegal, Abdou Diouf, for economic and financial affairs.

Ndiaye was director of the Attijariwafa Bank in Senegal, as well as chairman of the audit committee of the Attijariwafa Bank in Morocco. He was also the special advisor to the president and CEO of the Attijariwafa financial group, Mohamed El Kettani.

== Sports career ==
Ndiaye played tennis and represented the Sporting Club Tennis of Dakar and the Tennis Club of the University of Dakar in various tournaments.

He was manager of the Dakar University Tennis Club and the Dakar Olympic Club. Ndiaye was president of the Senegalese Tennis Foundation, the African Tennis Confederation, as well as the Senegalese Football Federation and the Senegalese National Olympic Committee.

From 2002 until 2013, he was a member of the Sport and Environment Commission, where he was then advisor from 2014 to 2015. In the International Relations Commission, he was a member in 2014, and advisor in 2015. He became a member of the IOC in 2015, where he was a part of the Public Affairs and Social Development through Sports Commission, as well as the Audit Committee from 2016 to 2017.

== Awards ==
Ndiaye has received various awards, including the:

From France

- Commander of the Order of Merit.
- Legion of Honour.
- Officer of the National Order of the Lion from Senegal.
- Commander of the Order of Isabella the Catholic from Spain
- Commander of the Order of Ouissam Alaouite from Morocco (2014)’.

Sporting positions
Preceded by (Argentina) Gerardo Werthein	President of Organizing Committee for Summer Youth Olympic Games; 2026	Succeeded by To Be Announced
