= Dante Caputo =

Argentine politician and academic (1943–2018)

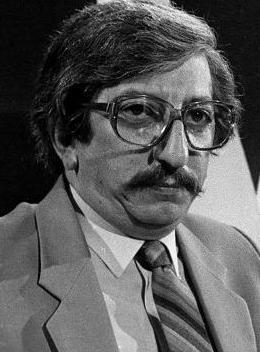
- Caputo in 1984

Minister of Foreign Affairs
- In office 10 December 1983 – 26 May 1989
- President: Raúl Alfonsín
- Preceded by: Juan Ramón Aguirre Lanari
- Succeeded by: Susana Ruiz Cerutti

President of the United Nations General Assembly
- In office 1988–1989
- Preceded by: Peter Florin
- Succeeded by: Joseph Nanven Garba

Personal details
- Born: 25 November 1943 Buenos Aires, Argentina
- Died: 20 June 2018 (aged 74) Buenos Aires, Argentina

Dante Caputo (25 November 1943 – 20 June 2018) was an Argentine academic, diplomat and politician, who served as the nation's foreign minister under President Raúl Alfonsín.

== Academic activity ==
Dante Mario Antonio Caputo was born in Buenos Aires to parents from Viggianello in the Basilicata region of Italy. He graduated in political science at the Universidad del Salvador in Buenos Aires in 1966, and subsequently completed a graduate degree at the Fletcher School of Law and Diplomacy at Tufts University. Between 1968 and 1972, he held various posts at the Organization of American States, and in 1972, earned a doctorate in Sociology at the University of Paris. In 1973, he was appointed as an investigator at the Torcuato di Tella Institute and for six years he headed the centre of investigations on state and administration.

Caputo taught at the Universities of Buenos Aires, del Salvador, Paris, Quilmes and La Plata.

== Minister of Foreign Affairs (1983-1989) ==
During the government of Raúl Alfonsín (1983–1989), Caputo served as Minister of Foreign Affairs (canciller) of Argentina and was the only minister to serve most of the President's term in office.

In this position:

- He signed the Treaty of Peace and Friendship of 1984 between Chile and Argentina, which ended the Beagle Channel conflict, in the course of which Caputo took part in a television debate with Peronist Senator Vicente Saadi.
- He was one of the promoters of the Contadora support group, which later led to the creation of the Rio Group, for joint and multilateral action by Latin American countries in order to preserve peace and democracy in the region.
- He was one of the leaders of the Cartagena Group with the object of taking joint action by indebted countries towards the creditors of the foreign debt.
- During his period in office, accords were agreed with Uruguay and Brazil which formed the basis of Mercosur.
- In 1988 he presided over the 43rd session of the United Nations General Assembly.

== Political activity and public service ==
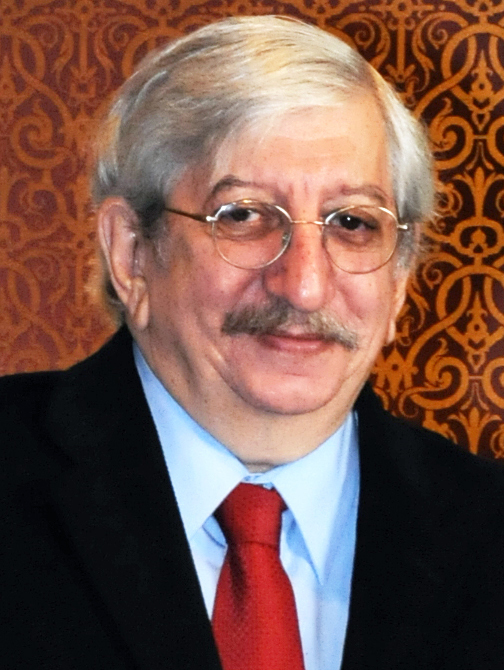
Caputo in 2011

Alfonsín's stand, though unpopular at the time, soon proved correct and was partly responsible for his securing the Radical Civic Union (UCR) nomination in 1983. Raúl Alfonsín was elected president on 30 October, upon which he named Dante Caputo Foreign Minister-designate.

After helping shepherd the Treaty of Peace and Friendship of 1984 between Chile and Argentina to ratification by voters and congress, Caputo was honoured with the ceremonial post of UN General Assembly President in November 1988.

Following his departure from the foreign minister's desk, Caputo was elected to the Chamber of Deputies and he served as vice-president of the Foreign Affairs Committee.

In 1992, Caputo represented the OAS and the United Nations in Haiti as a special envoy. In 1993, he was appointed the UN Secretary-General's representative to Haiti, as an under-secretary of the UN, and negotiated an agreement to allow a democratic transition on the island.

Having been a member of the Radical Civic Union (UCR), Caputo endorsed the FrePaSo ticket ahead of the 1995 general elections, and joined the centre-left party New Space (Nuevo Espacio), later that year. He served as Vice President of the Frepaso coalition from 1996 on behalf of New Space. In 1997, he was once again elected a deputy. He left New Space after personal differences with Carlos Raimundi, and in 1998 joined the Popular Socialist Party, remaining as vice-president of FrePaSo until 2000. In 1999, he sought the FrePaSo nomination for election as Mayor of Buenos Aires, but lost to Aníbal Ibarra, who went on to win in 2000.

In 2000, Caputo joined the government of Fernando de la Rúa, who had won the Presidency at the head of the UCR-FrePaSo Alliance, in 1999. Caputo became Secretary of Science, Technology and Productive Innovation, where he served until February 2001.

Between June 2001 and September 2004, he directed the Regional Project on democratic development in Latin America of the United Nations Development Programme.

He was a member of the Council of the Permanent Assembly for Human Rights of Argentina and served as the Secretary for Political Affairs of the Organization of American States.

== Publications ==
- El rol del sector público en el cambio de la sociedad Argentina entre 1930 y 1958. Doctoral thesis. Sorbonne. París. 1972
- El proceso de industrialización argentino entre 1900 y 1930. Institute of Latin American Studies. París 1970
- El poder militar en Argentina (1976-1981). In collaboration. Verlag Klaus Dieter Vervuert. Frankfurt. 1982
- Así nacen las democracias. In collaboration. Emecé. Buenos Aires, 1984
- Democratic culture and governance. Unesco-Hispamérica. 1992
- América Latina y las democracias pobres. Ediciones del Quinto Centenario. Madrid 1992.
- Frepaso, alternancia o alternativa, with Julio Godio. Editor. Buenos Aires. 1996.
- Argentina en el comienzo del tercer milenio. In collaboration. Editorial Atlántida. Buenos Aires
- La democracia en America Latina, 2004, PNUD, (Editor)
- Contribuciones al debate de la democracia en América Latina, 2005, PNUD, Santillana.
- Nuestra democracia, 2010, OAS and PNUD, (Editor)
- "El desarrollo democrático en América Latina: entre la crisis de legitimidad y la crisis de sustentabilidad," Revista SAAP, 2011.

Diplomatic posts
Preceded by Peter Florin	President of the United Nations General Assembly; 1988–1989	Succeeded by Joseph Nanven Garba
