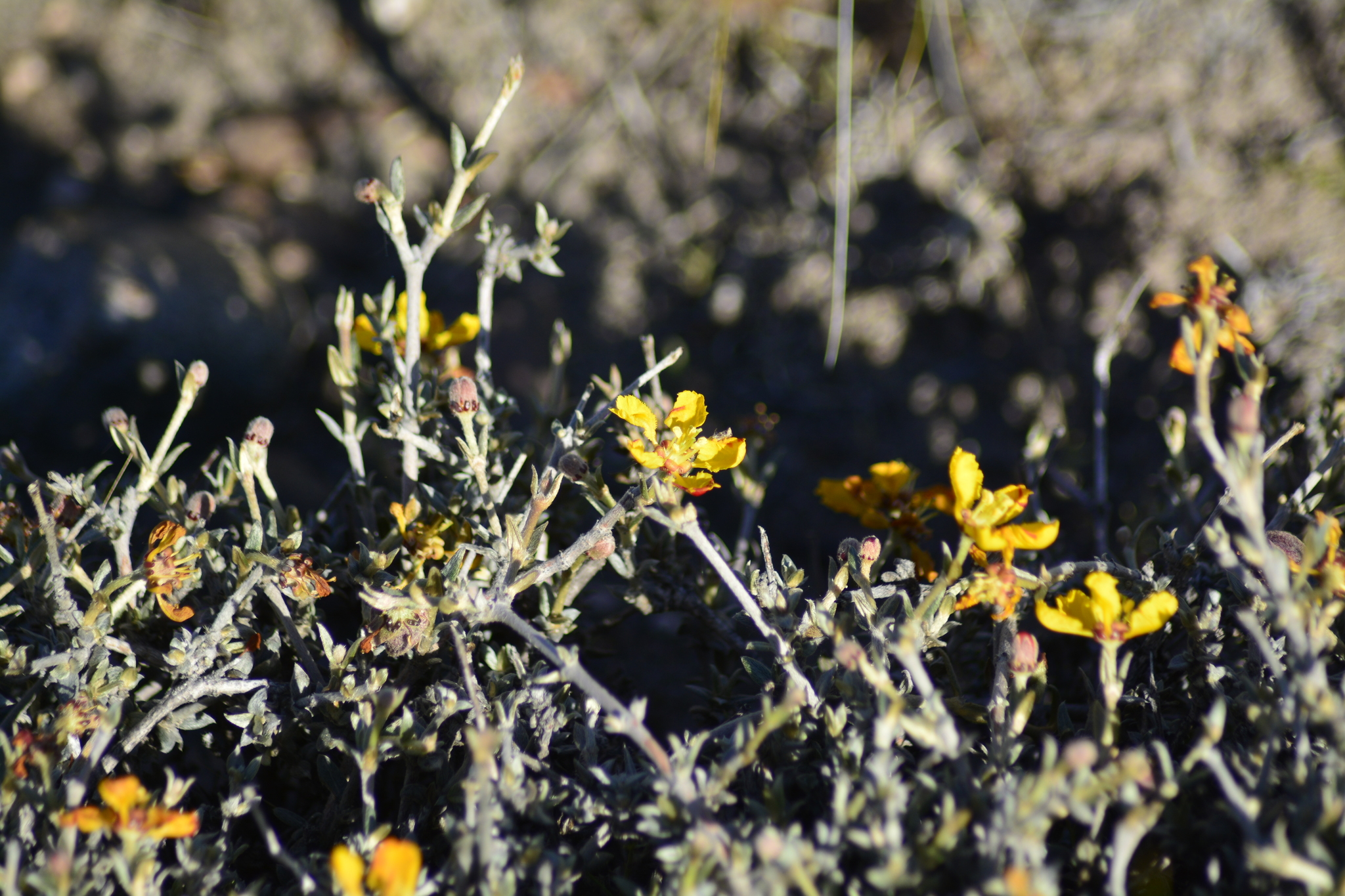
- Mionandra fischeri

Scientific classification
- Kingdom: Plantae
- Clade: Tracheophytes
- Clade: Angiosperms
- Clade: Eudicots
- Clade: Rosids
- Order: Malpighiales
- Family: Malpighiaceae
- Genus: Mionandra; Griseb.

Synonyms
- Brittonella Rusby; Cordobia Nied.; Gallardoa Hicken

= Mionandra =

Genus of plants

Mionandra is a genus of flowering plants belonging to the family Malpighiaceae.

Its native range is Argentina, Bolivia, and Paraguay.

Four species are accepted:

- Mionandra argentea Griseb.
- Mionandra camareoides Griseb.
- Mionandra fischeri (Hicken) R.F.Almeida
- Mionandra paraguariensis Chodat
