= Instituto del Servicio Exterior de la Nación =

Argentine government diplomatic training program

Coordinates: 34°35′38″S 58°22′42″W

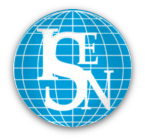

Agency overview
- Formed: April 10, 1963; 63 years ago
- Headquarters: Esmeralda 1212, Buenos Aires, Argentina
- Agency executives: Eduardo Demayo, Director; Rodrigo López Gadano, Subdirector; Luciano Nosetto, Academic Director
- Parent department: Ministry of Foreign Affairs and Worship
- Website: www.cancilleria.gob.ar/es/instituto-del-servicio-exterior-de-la-nacion

The Instituto del Servicio Exterior de la Nación ("Foreign Service Institute of the Nation", ISEN), is the Argentine government's training institution for employees of the diplomatic service. It is dependent on the Ministry of Foreign Affairs and Worship. Its goals are to select and train Argentine diplomats and other employees of the diplomatic service so they may advance the Argentine foreign affairs agenda, as well as to produce knowledge on current international affairs.

Since its foundation in 1963, it has served as the only institution for selecting and training diplomatic professionals in Argentina. ISEN graduates are granted "diplomatic state" for life, meaning they must follow the responsibilities laid out in Argentine diplomatic law even after retirement.

== History ==
The ISEN was founded on 10 April 1963, during the presidency of José María Guido, on initiative of Foreign Minister Carlos M. Muñiz. Discussions on the professionalisation of diplomatic corps (as well as other state officials, in general) had become popular in Argentina and elsewhere since the 1950s. Throughout the 20th century, Argentina's unstable political climate led to abrupt changes in the institute's curricula and internal norms.

The same year of its foundation, the first class of diplomats graduated from the institute. At the time of its foundation, no prior education was required for applicants. This would change starting in 1971, due in part to protests from undergraduate students of diplomacy degrees from Argentine universities. Academic standards were dropped during the last military dictatorship in Argentina (1976 to 1983), during which letters of recommendation from high-ranking military officers were used as the main criterion for aspiring applicants.
