= Estanislao Zeballos =

Argentine lawyer and politician

Estanislao Severo Zeballos
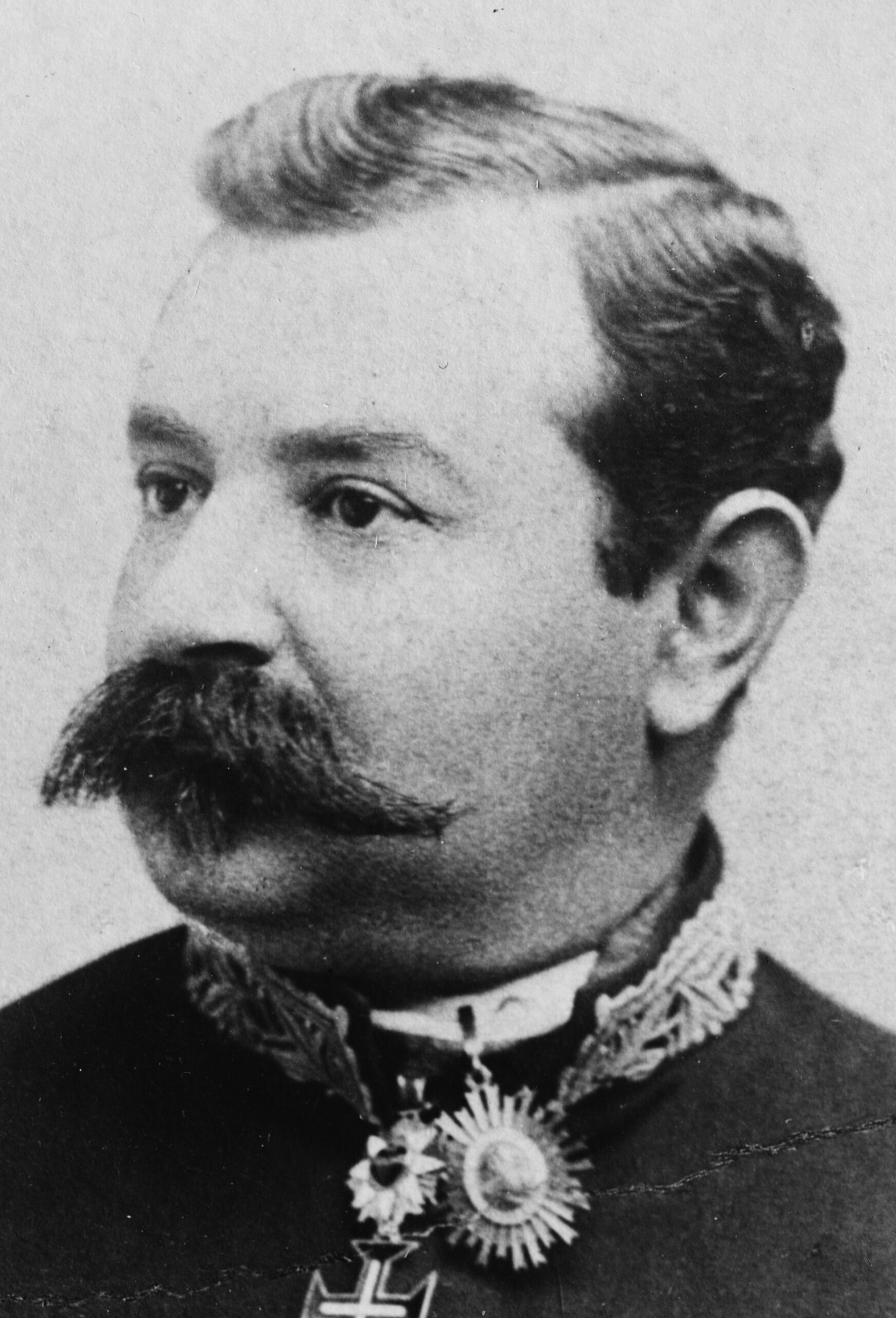
- Born: 27 July 1854; Rosario, Santa Fe, Argentina
- Died: 4 October 1923 (aged 69); Liverpool, United Kingdom
- Occupations: Lawyer, politician, writer

Estanislao Severo Zeballos (27 July 1854 - 4 October 1923) was an Argentine lawyer and politician who was Minister of Foreign Affairs of his country three times. He was one of the most prominent intellectuals and politicians of his time. He wrote on a broad range of subjects in books and periodicals, including Catholicism, history, ethnography and geography.

== Early years ==
Estanislao Severo Zeballos born in Rosario, Santa Fe, Argentina on 27 July 1854, the eldest son of Lieutenant Colonel Estanislao Zeballos and Felisa Juárez. His father was an aide to General Juan Pablo López, and was wounded in 1838 when fighting against the Indians. In 1850, with the rank of major, his father became captain of Puerto de Rosario. His father supported the Great Army of Justo José de Urquiza in 1851, and was promoted to lieutenant colonel. Zeballos senior served as Judge in Rosario in 1853, and was the first to name the streets of the city. Both parents were related to established and influential families of Rosario, which helped in Estanislao's professional, social and political advancement. His mother was from the families of Ricardo López Jordán and Francisco Ramírez.

During his youth Zeballos formed important social and political ties with the supporters of Urquiza, especially Martín Ruiz Moreno, Urquiza's lawyer. In his youth, he was accompanying his father near the post of Arequito, Santa Fe when they were attacked by a raiding party of Ranquel people, but managed to escape at the gallop. He studied at the School of Arts and Crafts in his home town. Due to the mediation of Governor Nicasio Oroño, at twelve years old he received a scholarship to continue his initial studies in the National College of Buenos Aires. Between 1870 and 1871 the city was attacked by the scourge of yellow fever. A People's Health Committee was set up, chaired by José Camilo Paz. Zeballos, then his student, helped him in transferring the bodies of victims. Zeballos contracted the disease but recovered.

Zeballos studied at the University of Buenos Aires in the Faculties of Law and Science. He led the student protests of 1871, caused by the suicide of the student Roberto Sánchez, who had unjustly been failed in an exam. The protest led to major changes in the university's academic structure. He was one of the founders of the "Revolutionary Junta for University Reform" along with Pedro Narciso Arata, Francisco Ramos Mejía, José María Ramos Mejía, Lucio Vicente López, Juan Carlos Belgrano, José María Cantilo, Francisco B. Pico and others. Zeballos was elected Secretary of the Board, of which Belgrano was president.

Zeballos graduated in law in 1874 and at once began to practice as a professor at the National College. The same year, José Camilo Paz hired him as a reporter for the newspaper La Prensa, to which he would be linked throughout his life, becoming its editor in chief and director. When on 24 September 1874 José C. Paz closed down La Prensa to join the revolution of 1874, Zeballos joined him and was secretary of the campaign of Bartolomé Mitre. The revolution was defeated at the Battle of La Verde, and he spent some time in prison.

== Science and literature ==
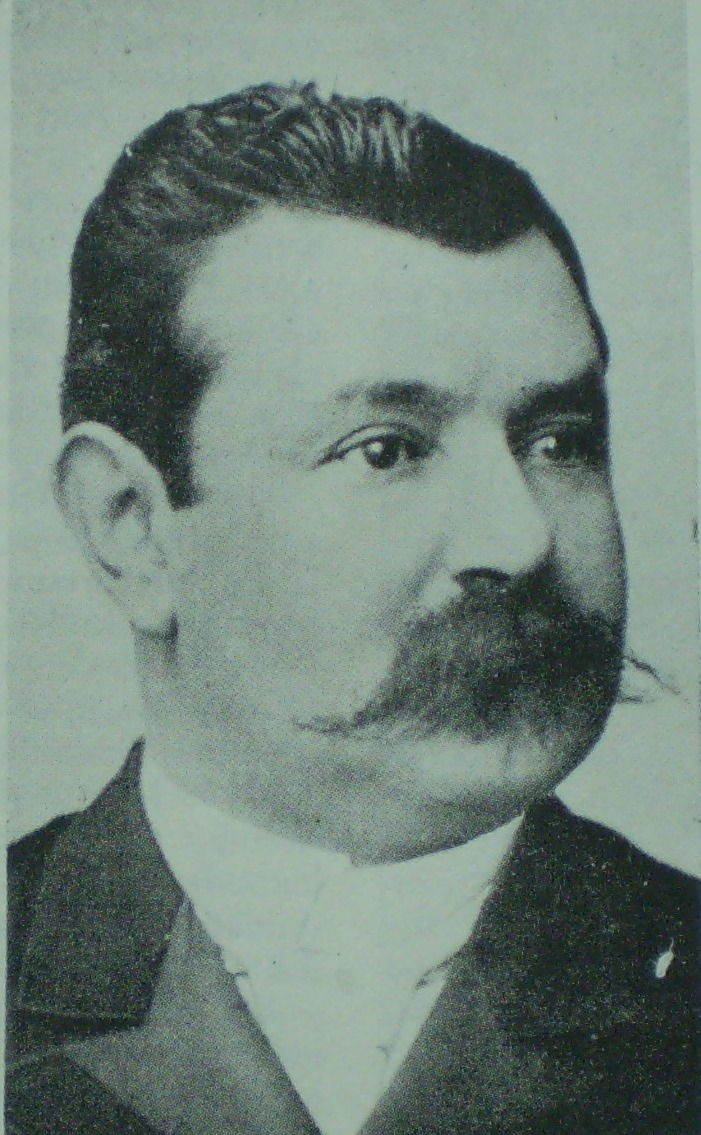

Pursuing his studies, in 1872 he participated in founding the "Society of Scientific Stimulus", which was soon converted to the "Scientific Society of Argentina". He edited its review Anales and was one of its most active members. To make ends meet while in Buenos Aires, for a time he was the writer for the German naturalist Germán Burmeister, Director of the Public Museum. In 1875, he presented to the Scientific Society of Argentina the project of forming the Museum of Natural Sciences. A year before he had been excavated in the banks of the Parana river, finding the remains of a giant sloth. Two years later he published in collaboration with the engineer Pedro Pico a report on the pre-Hispanic mound of Campana, Buenos Aires, which started the systematization of archaeological research in the country.

He supported the expedition of Francisco Pascasio Moreno to explore the basins of the Rio Negro and Río Limay. Years later he collected the information obtained, proposing the transfer of the southern border to the Río Negro in his book The Conquest of fifteen thousand leagues, published in 1878. He wrote the book in a few weeks, at the request of General Julio Argentino Roca, to convince members of Congress to fund the Conquest of the Desert which was already being started by the then minister of war. In La Conquista de quince mil leguas indigenous Mapuche were presented as Chileans who were bound to return to Chile. Mapuches were thus indirectly considered foreign enemies. Such notion fitted well with the expansionist designs of Nicolás Avellaneda and Julio Argentino Roca for Puelmapu, the Mapuche homeland in the Pampas and northern Patagonia. The notion of Mapuches as Chileans is however an anachronism as Mapuches precede the formation of the modern state of Chile.

In 1879 he founded the "Argentine Geographic Institute", of which he was the first president. He managed to obtain a subsidy to Florentino Ameghino to publish his studies of fossil mammals. After the Roca campaign, in late 1879 he made a long journey to the north of Patagonia and recorded his observations Viaje al país de los araucanos (Journey to the country of the Araucanians), published in 1881. This was the first volume of a trilogy, followed by La Región del Trigo (The Region of Wheat) (1883) and A través de las cabañas (1888). He then wrote a fictionalized chronicles of the chieftains Calfucurá and Painé, and a nonexistent Huiliche chieftain, Relmú.

== National deputy ==
That same year Zeballos was elected provincial deputy in a list that included Bernardo de Irigoyen, Miguel Cané, Lucio Vicente López, Miguel Goyena, Nicolás Calvo, Delfín Gallo, Luis Sáenz Peña, José C. Paz, Antonino Cambaceres and Hipólito Yrigoyen. The next year he was elected national deputy, and during the revolution of 1880 he supported the administration of President Nicolás Avellaneda. He supported General Eduardo Racedo in the battle of Puente Alsina on 20 and 21 June.

During his first term as national deputy Zeballos was the author of numerous initiatives: reform of the Code of Commerce and the law for establishing agricultural colonies, wines, railways, building the Federal University of Rosario, Civil Marriage and many others. At the end of his first term as national deputy, at the age of 30, he ran for governor of Santa Fe. First he founded the Constitution Party, which nominated his candidacy in 1885, the year before the elections of 1886, during the government of Manuel María Zavalla. A committee supporting his candidacy traveled to Buenos Aires to meet with President Roca. Roca refused to give him support because at the national level Zeballos supported Bernardo de Irigoyen against Roca's candidate for president, Miguel Ángel Juárez Celman, who was elected. However, Zeballos was elected national deputy that year, 1886.

== Minister of Foreign Affairs ==
In 1889, when Zeballos was Speaker of the House of Representatives, he was appointed Foreign Minister by President Juárez Celman. Given the risk that the country was facing from boundary disputes with Chile, the new minister formed a special committee to acquire modern weapons in Europe. It was headed by José C. Paz, then Minister to France, and one of its members later was General Pablo Ricchieri, who left a chronicle of his mission in Europe. Zeballos resigned along with most of the Cabinet in April 1890 at the beginning of the crisis would lead to the Revolution of the Park later that year.

Zeballos was Foreign Minister again between October 1891 and October 1892, during the presidency of Carlos Pellegrini, during which he rejected the claim from Britain for compensation for British nationals who had suffered damages during the revolution of 1890. He also faced claims from France over the expulsion of a ship of that flag from Argentine territorial waters. As a result, he signed a trade and navigation agreement with that country in 1892.

He presented several differences in interpretation of the boundary treaty of 1881 to the Chilean government. He also performed decisively in the so-called Baltimore Incident, intervening in favor of the United States and against the Chilean government that succeeded the ousted President José Manuel Balmaceda. The following year he was appointed Minister Plenipotentiary to Mexico, but was diverted to the United States, where he met with President Grover Cleveland for settlement of the boundary dispute with Brazil in Misiones Province.

He left politics for several years, devoting himself to practice as a private attorney and a professor at the University of Buenos Aires. In 1901 he became a member of the Board of History and Numismatics, now the National Academy of History of Argentina.

== New ministry ==
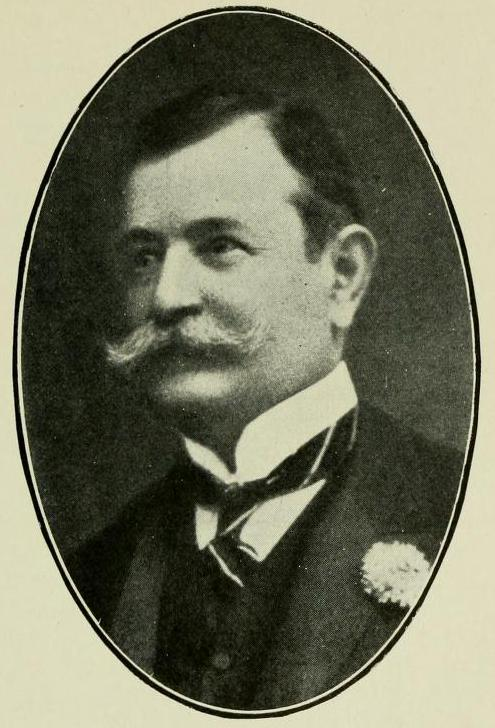

By 1905 Zeballos was again involved in diplomatic affairs after publishing an article entitled "The incident of the border with Chile and the Nueva and Picton Islands", referring to the sovereignty dispute over the Beagle Channel.

In 1906 Zeballos was appointed Foreign Minister by President José Figueroa Alcorta. During his tenure, he became one of the main proponents of Argentina's naval and military rearmament, using the press, notably the newspapers La Prensa, La Razón and El Sarmiento, to warn against what he perceived as Brazil's growing regional power and influence. The contemporary newspapers associated with him portrayed Brazilian naval expansion as a direct threat to Argentina, contributing to a climate of diplomatic tension between the two countries. While serving as foreign minister, Zeballos denounced the 1902 Argentine-Chilean Naval Equivalency Treaty and proposed, in a secret cabinet meeting held with President Alcorta on 10 June 1908, to demand Brazil give Argentina one its dreadnoughts warships that were under construction. In case Brazil refused, the plan envisioned a preemptive war against Brazil, conceived as a rapid and surprise attack, with the mobilization of 50 thousand soldiers and the Argentine fleet, as well as an attack on Rio de Janeiro.

In 1908 he temporarily assumed the ministries of Justice and Public Instruction, but a cabinet crisis forced him to resign from both positions in June 1908. He then began a tour across the country to present to various audiences his views on Argentina's foreign policy, which lasted until the following year. His collected speeches and articles appeared in the Journal of Law, History and Literature between 1908 and 1910 in a work entitled "Diplomacy Disarmed", in which he defended the balance of military forces as a basis for peace and the guarantee of equitable justice in disputes. Regarding the search for peace at any cost, he said:

It causes me much grief, gentlemen, that every day the august name of peace is profaned in Argentina! Peace is not suicide, peace is life.

At that time he also advocated:

Necessary reorganization of the railways and other means of transport, to reduce them to a system in which national interests predominate, as the only means of defending the rights of Argentina's production against private interests that are certainly legitimate, but that start to dominate our administrations, the press and political circles to such an extent that there is little hope of controlling them ...

== National deputy again ==
He became a national deputy again from 1912 to 1916, and during this period he gave his most notable parliamentary performances. During questioning of former Foreign Minister Luis María Drago and the current Foreign Minister José Luis Murature, whom he had opposed as a journalist, he finally persuaded the latter to accept his position. During a debate on rediscount of bank portfolios, in July 1914, he said:

As regards the protection of foreign capital, the country has abdicated its sovereignty and dignity; its sovereignty because we have placed the supreme power to issue currency in the hands of unknown foreigners ... of our dignity because we do not defend ourselves from exploitation by foreign capital, which has grown to form monopolies, so that a few hands manipulate the wealth of Argentina, imposing the voracious law of prices on large and small, on wheat and bread.

His parliamentary speech defending the rights of Argentines after the capture of the steamer "President Mitre" by Great Britain in 1915, was incorporated into the Daily Record of the House of Representatives of the United States, for its collection of legal doctrine on Public International Law. Other projects that had significant impact were related to agriculture, irrigation, sanitary conveniences, meat trade, road construction and growth of shipping under the national flag.

== Last years ==
In 1918 he was appointed Dean of the Faculty of Law, University of Buenos Aires, where he was Professor of International Private Law for 24 years. He systematized what he called the "Argentine Theory of Private Human Law", which was adopted by the International Law Association in 1922. One of the original principles was the introduction of the extraterritoriality of the home in private affairs, a policy that would have the serious consequence of giving foreign companies impunity in Latin America. He presented his theory in a voluminous book written in 5 volumes in French, "La Nationalité au point de vue de la législation comparée et du Droit Privé humain".

At the age of 69 he traveled to the United States, invited by Harvard University to participate in a series of lectures that he gave in English. They were published posthumously in 1927. From the United States he traveled to England and died in Liverpool on 4 October 1923. His remains lie in the cemetery of La Recoleta.

== Works ==
He was a prolific writer, publishing books, articles, lectures, biographies and bibliographical notes, amounting to over 400 titles. Some of them are:

- La conquista de 15.000 leguas (1878)
- Episodios en los territorios del sur (1879)
- Viaje al país de los araucanos (1881)
- Descripción amena de la República Argentina (1881)
- El Avance de la Frontera a los Andes (1883)
- Callvucurá y la dinastía de los piedra (1884)
- Painé y la dinastía de los zorros (1886)
- Relmú, reina de los pinares (1888)
- Los porteños
- Los provincianos
- Semblanza del ingeniero Carlos Pellegrini
- Arbitration upon a part of the National Territory of Misiones, disputed by the United States of Brazil. Argentine evidence laid before the President of the United States of America by Estanislao S. Zeballos, envoy extraordinary and Minister Plenipotentiary of the Argentine Republic. (1893, S. Figueroa Printer, New York)
- Colección de papeles sobre el general San Martín (1898)
- El Escudo y los Colores nacionales (1900)
- Fracaso de la instrucción primaria (1908)
- El crédito y el régimen hipotecario de la República Argentina y en el Nuevo Mundo (en francés, 1909)
- La Nationalité au point de vue de la législation comparée et du Droit Privé humain, 5 Vols., París, Sirey. (1914-1919).

He also wrote several biographies that have more literary than historical value, including those of Barón del Río Branco, Bartolomé Mitre, Julio Argentino Roca, Domingo Faustino Sarmiento, Martín Miguel de Güemes and Emilio Mitre, his friend since childhood. Among his numerous unpublished works are the manuscripts of an incomplete history of the War with Paraguay, drawing on official documents and on personal contributions from General Mitre, whom he met weekly for years.

== Notes and references ==
Citations

Sources

- Babini, José (1963). Las ciencias en la historia argentina. Buenos Aires: Eudeba.
- Brezzo, Liliana M. (2009–2010). "La guerra de la Triple Alianza en la primera persona de los vencidos: el hallazgo y la incorporación de la sección Estanislao S. Zeballos del Ministerio de Defensa del Paraguay". Anuario Escuela de Historia. 22.
- Carrasco, Eduardo y Gabriel (1897). "Anales de la ciudad del Rosario de Santa Fé". Buenos Aires, Impr. de J. Peuser.
- Dalla Corte-Caballero, Gabriela (2011). "Felisa Jordán, la madre de Estanislao Zeballos. Prácticas asociativas, espacio público y proyección femenina en Argentina (1870/1880)". Páginas - Revista Digital de la Escuela de Historia -UNR. 3 (5). Archived from the original on 5 January 2012.
- de Marco, Miguel Ángel (2009). "Dos escritos juveniles de Estanislao S. Zeballos" (PDF). Temas de historia argentina y americana (14): 5. Archived from the original (PDF) on 5 March 2016.
- Doratioto, Francisco (August 2000). "A política platina do Barão do Rio Branco" (PDF). Scientific Electronic Library Online do Brazil (in Portuguese).
- Fernandez, Sandra (2009). El desierto y sus confines. Contexto y narrativa en la Descripción Amena de la República Argentina de Estanislao Zeballos, en Experiências nacionais, temas transversais: subsídios para uma história comparada da América Latina. Oikos. ISBN 978-85-7843-116-7.
- Heinsfeld, Adelar. "Falsificando telegramas: Estanislau Severo Zeballos e as relações Brasil-Argentina no início do século XX" (PDF). IX Encontro Estadual de História "Vestígios do Passado", Seçao Rio Grande do Sul (in Portuguese).
- Lacoste, Pablo (2003). "Estanislao Zeballos y la política exterior Argentina con Brasil y Chile". Confluencia. 1 (2).
- Ortiz, Tulio; Scotti, Luciana (2008). "Las Reformas antes de la reforma. Primeros Movimientos estudiantiles de la Universidad de Buenos Aires" (PDF). Facultad de Derecho - Universidad de Buenos Aires. Archived from the original (PDF) on 27 July 2018.
- Sanguinetti, Horacio (2006). "EL COLEGIO NACIONAL DE BUENOS AIRES Y LA SOCIEDAD CIENTÍFICA ARGENTINA" (PDF). Academia Nacional de Ciencias Morales y Políticas.

Further reading

- Etchepareborda, Roberto, "Homenaje a Estanislao Zeballos en el cincuentenario de su muerte. Su trayectoria vital y su labor historiográfica", en Boletín de la Academia Nacional de la Historia, Buenos Aires, 1973
- Etchepareborda, Roberto, "Zeballos y la política exterior argentina", Editorial Pleamar, Buenos Aires, 1982.
- Parker, William Belmont, "Estanislao Zeballos", Argentines of to-day, en Hispanic Notes & Monographs, tomo V, The Hispanic Society Of America, Nueva York, 1920
- Preuss, Ori, "Transnational South America", Routledge: New York, 2016.
- Santiago Sanz, Luis, "Zeballos : el Tratado de 1881, Guerra del Pacífico : un discurso académico y seis estudios de historia diplomática", Editorial Pleamar, Buenos Aires, 1985.
- Sandra Fernández y Fernando Navarro, compiladores, "Scribere est agere. Estanislao Zeballos en la vorágine de la modernidad argentina", La Quinta Pata & Camino editores, Rosario, Argentina, 2011.
- Celada Domínguez, Gregoria y Giacalone, Rita, "Revista de Derecho, Historia Y Letras, (1898 - 1923), Estudio e Indice General", Universidad del Salvador, Facultad de Filosofía, Historia y Letras, IUSHISTORIA, Nº 4 - Octubre de 2007, ISSN 1851-3522, Buenos Aires.

External links

- Perfil de Estanislao Zeballos escrito y publicado en 1886, en el periódico "El Nacional" de Buenos Aires.
- The Internet archive contiene varias obras importantes de Zeballos en formato facsimilar.
