= Carlos Washington Pastor =

Argentinian Air Force officer (1924–2012)

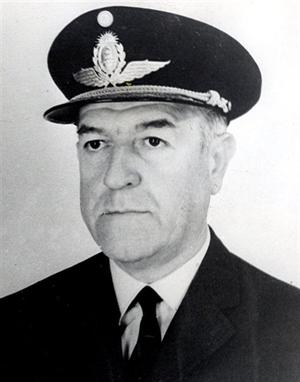
Carlos Washington Pastor

Carlos Washington Pastor (20 June 1924 – 9 January 2012) was an Argentine Air Force officer. He served as Minister of Foreign Affairs of Argentina during the presidency of Jorge Rafael Videla between 1976 and 1981.

He was born in Villa Mercedes, San Luis Province into a family from there. He was married to María Isabel Hartridge, whose sister was Videla's wife. Initially, he was part of Argentine Army and graduated at the Colegio Militar de la Nación in 1928, but he was transferred to the recent-created Argentine Air Force in 1945.

During his term as Minister, Argentina was in the middle of a conflict with Chile for the Beagle Channel islands and also denounced for human rights violations.
