= Nicanor Costa Méndez =

Argentine diplomat (1922–1992)

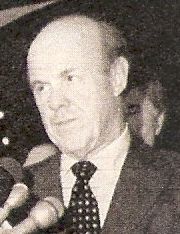
Nicanor Costa Méndez

Nicanor Costa Méndez (October 30, 1922 – August 3, 1992) was an Argentine diplomat.

Costa Méndez was born into a privileged background in Buenos Aires, in 1922. He attended the University of Buenos Aires, graduating with a Law Degree in 1943. He went on to receive his juris doctor and opened a law practice.

Costa Méndez served as the Argentine ambassador to Chile from 1962 to 1964, and chargé d'affaires and ambassador to the Republic of China (Taiwan) from 1965 to 1966. He was appointed Foreign Minister by President Juan Carlos Onganía in 1966 and served in that post until 1969. An avowed anti-Communist, Costa Méndez favored close ties with the United States.

Costa Méndez returned to the Foreign Ministry under a later dictator, Gen. Leopoldo Galtieri, at the end of 1981, and remained in the post during the April–June 1982 Falklands War between the United Kingdom and Argentina. President Galtieri, a significant supporter of the Contras during the Nicaraguan Civil War, believed that support would be forthcoming from Reagan administration; when the United States and Western Europe sided with Britain during the conflict, however, Costa Méndez sought the support of the Communist bloc, flying to Cuba to attend a meeting of Non-aligned nations and to confer with President Fidel Castro.

During meetings at the time of the United Nations Security Council and the Organization of American States, Costa Méndez depicted United States support for Britain in the Falklands War as a "betrayal to the rest of the Americas," and following Argentine surrender on June 14, Galtieri and his Foreign Minister were removed.

Costa Méndez's duplicity in his capacity as both the nation's chief diplomat and the junta's leading civilian adviser was highlighted by a local, 1983 official board of inquiry. The report documented that Costa Méndez had assured Galtieri that the United States would remain neutral in the event of war, despite an explicit message to the contrary from the American Secretary of State, Alexander Haig (by then, the British Royal Navy was advancing toward the islands).

== In popular culture ==
Costa Méndez is mentioned by name in the Macc Lads' song Buenos Aires.

Costa Méndez was portrayed by Vernon Dobtcheff in the 2002 BBC production of Ian Curteis's controversial The Falklands Play.
