= Amancio Alcorta =

Argentine legal theorist, politician and diplomat

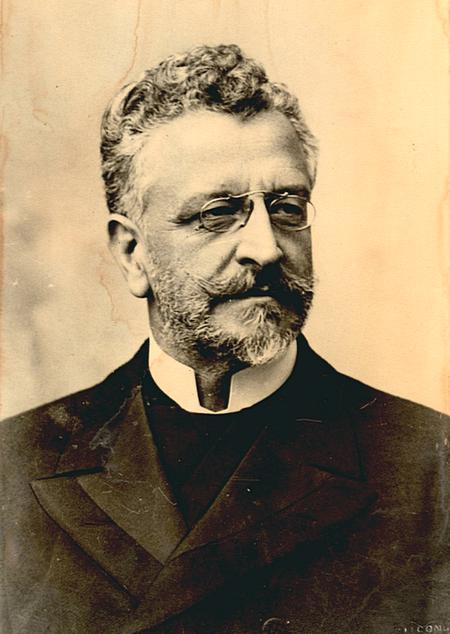
- Born: March 27, 1842
- Died: May 5, 1902 (aged 60)

Academic background
- Education: University of Buenos Aires

Academic work
- Discipline: legal studies
- Institutions: University of Buenos Aires
- Main interests: maritime piracy local currency constitutional law property rights
- Notable works: Treatise on International Law; Studies on the Use of Scrip

Amancio Alcorta (March 27, 1842 – May 5, 1902) was an Argentine legal theorist, conservative politician and diplomat.

== Life and times ==
Amancio Alcorta was born in Buenos Aires, in 1842, and enrolled at the University of Buenos Aires, where he received a juris doctor, in 1867. He was subsequently elected to the Argentine Chamber of Deputies on the Autonomist Party ticket, as a close ally of the new Governor of Buenos Aires Province, Adolfo Alsina. Permitted to hold multiple posts outside Congress, Alcorta was later appointed prosecutor and judge, as well as to the board of directors of the Buenos Aires Western Railway. He served Governor Alsina as Minister of Government Policy, of Economy and as President of the Bank of the Province of Buenos Aires. He was appointed Director of the National Buenos Aires College (then the nation's most prominent secondary school) in 1872, and in 1873, presented his proposal for the reform of the national code of commerce, centering on maritime law.

Continuing to teach law at his alma mater, in 1878 he authored his Treatise on International Law, a text which drew heavily on his study of measures against maritime piracy. His Studies on the Use of Scrip in 1880, dealt with Argentine provinces' recurrent use of local currency. Alcorta also authored texts on constitutional law and regarding property rights, during the 1880s. He had left Congress in 1880, though he continued to actively support the Autonomists' successors, the National Autonomist Party. Backed by the majority of Argentina's landowners, that party' leader (Julio Roca) was elected President of Argentina in 1880. Roca's successor, Miguel Juárez Celman, appointed Alcorta Minister of Foreign Relations during an institutional crisis in 1890; Alcorta was replaced following Juárez Celman's July 1890 resignation, however.

His January 1895 reappointment to the Foreign Ministry by President Luis Sáenz Peña coincided with difficult negotiations with the Government of Chile regarding the Andes-range border shared by the two nations. His second turn at the Foreign Ministry was devoted to the resolution of the Puna de Atacama dispute between the two nations, negotiations on which resulted in an 1898 treaty favorable to Argentina. Alcorta retired from the post in December 1899, having served three Presidents. A new diplomatic impasse led President Roca to reappoint the elder statesman to the post in April 1900. Alcorta died on May 5, 1902, at age 60 and three weeks before the signing of the May Pacts between Chile and Argentina.

His personal law library, consisting of over 18,000 volumes, was donated to the National Library of Argentina.
