= Ministry of Foreign Affairs, International Trade and Worship =

Government ministry of Argentina

- Ministerio de Relaciones Exteriores, Comercio Internacional y Culto
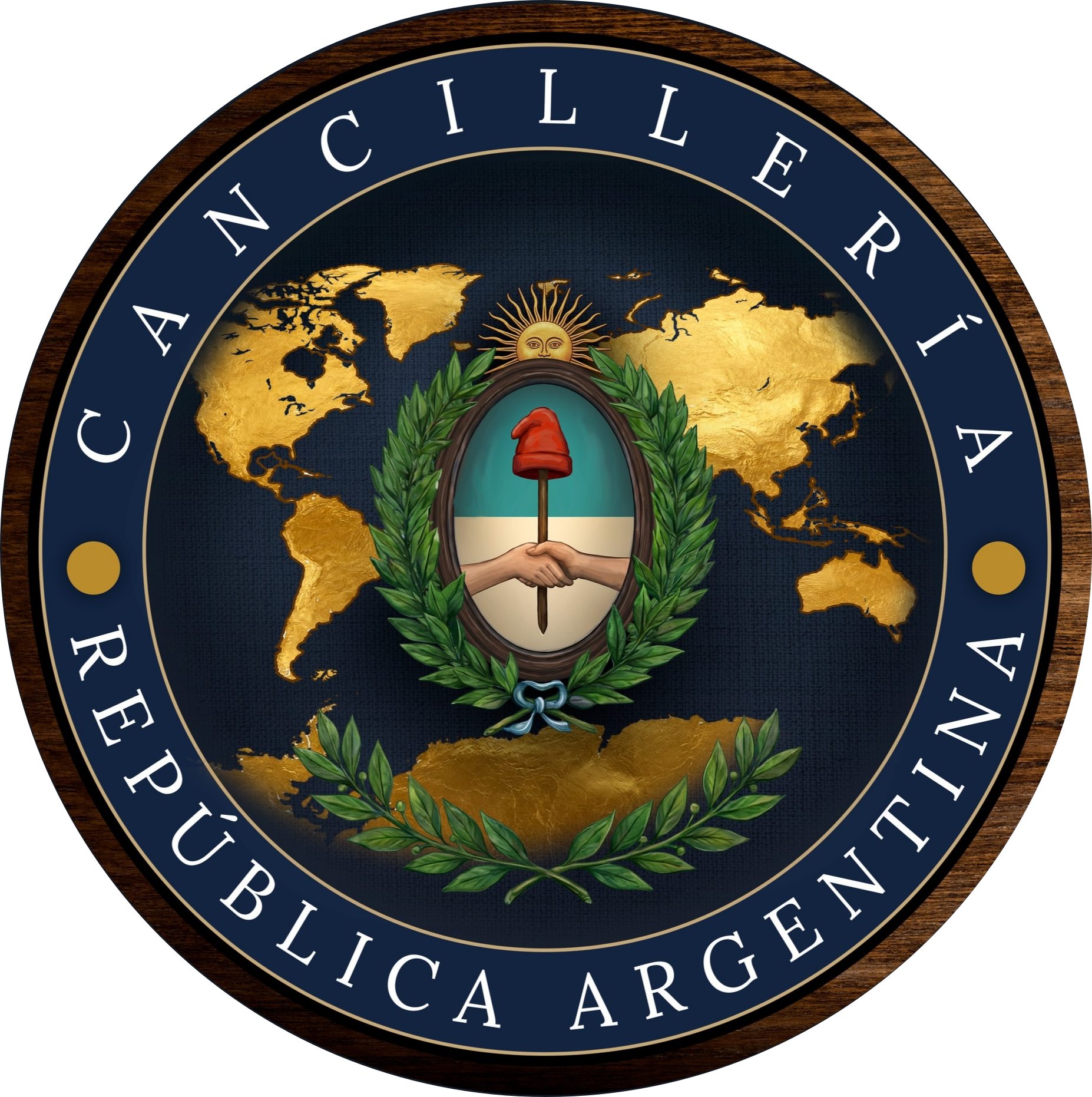

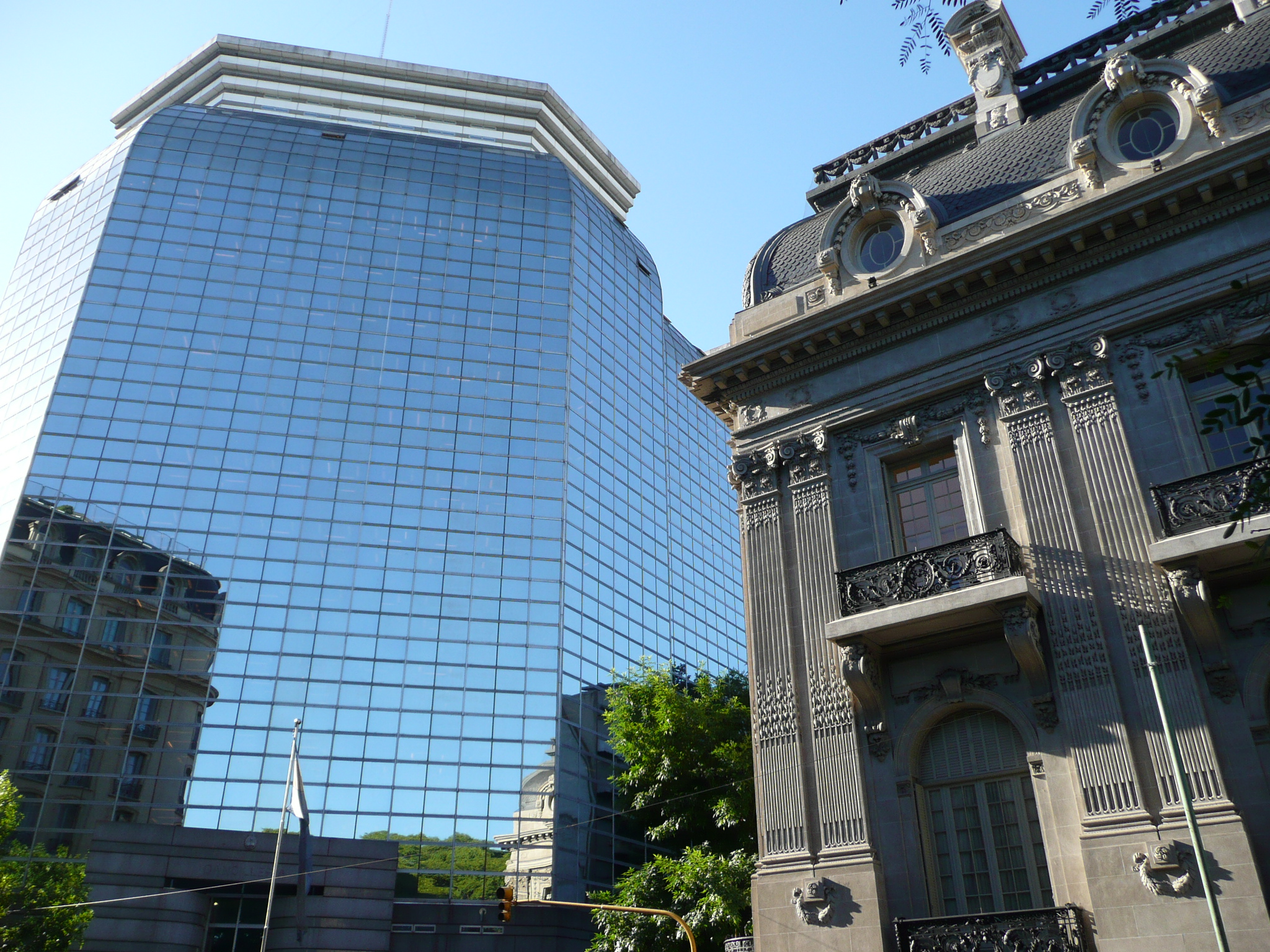
- Edificio Cancillería and San Martín Palace, (respectively) the working and ceremonial headquarters of the Ministry

Ministry overview
- Formed: 1854; 172 years ago
- Jurisdiction: Government of Argentina
- Headquarters: Buenos Aires
- Employees: 1,936 (2009)
- Annual budget: $ 22,570,000,000 (2018)
- Minister responsible: Pablo Quirno
- Child Ministry: White Helmets Commission
- Website: cancilleria.gob.ar

The Ministry of Foreign Affairs, International Trade and Worship (Spanish: Ministerio de Relaciones Exteriores, Comercio Internacional y Culto; abbreviated MRECIC), informally referred to as the Chancellery (Spanish: Cancillería), is the Argentine government ministry dealing with the foreign relations of Argentina, Argentina's foreign policy, international development, international trade, diaspora and matters dealing with Mercosur and the Catholic Church.

The Ministry of Foreign Affairs is one of the oldest continuously existing portfolios in the Argentine government, having existed uninterruptedly since the formation of the first Argentine executive in 1854, in the presidency of Justo José de Urquiza. The incumbent minister is Pablo Quirno, who has served since 22 October 2025 in the cabinet of Javier Milei.

== Structure and dependencies ==
The Ministry's Department of Worship (Secretaría de Culto) has several directorates. The Registry Directorate maintains the National Register of Religions, which compiles the mandatory registrations of all churches and religious communities, other than those of the Catholic Church.

The Directorate General for Catholic Worship (La Dirección General de Culto Católico), is the main liaison for the government of Argentina with the Catholic Church, by far the largest religious body in Argentina. It maintains relations with the archbishops, the bishop's conference and with the various monastic orders. The department also awards individuals and organizations that, through their work, have encouraged rich ecumenical and interreligious dialogue.

The ministry also oversees the Instituto del Servicio Exterior de la Nación, Argentina's primary diplomatic academy.

== Headquarters ==
The Ministry of Foreign Affairs was originally headquartered in San Martín Palace, in the Retiro barrio of Buenos Aires. The palace, designed by architect Alejandro Christophersen and completed in 1905, originally belonged to the wealthy Anchorena family, and was bought by the Argentine government in 1936.

Since 1993, the Ministry's main offices have been housed in the informally named Edificio Cancillería, located across the street from San Martín Palace. The Palace remains in use as the ceremonial headquarters of the Ministry.

== See also ==
- Foreign relations of Argentina
- List of diplomatic missions of Argentina
- List of diplomatic missions in Argentina
