= List of French Argentines =

French Argentines are Argentines of full or partial French descent, or French-born people who reside in Argentina. Most of French immigrants settled in Argentina from the 1870s until WW1, though consistent immigration started in the 1820s and continued until the late 1940s. Half of these immigrants came from Southwestern France, especially from the Basque Country and Béarn (former Basses-Pyrénées accounted for more than 20% of immigrants), as well as Bigorre and Rouergue, but also from Savoy and the Paris region. As early as in the 1840s, Argentina also received immigrants with French background from neighboring countries, notably Uruguay. In 2006, it was estimated that around 8 million Argentines had some degree of French ancestry (up to 17% of the total population).

== Business ==
- Carlos Pedro Blaquier, CEO of Ledesma, with distant French ancestry through his maternal great-grandparents
- Alfredo Fortabat, founder of Loma Negra, born to French parents
- Juan Alberto Harriet, landowner and entrepreneur, born to French father
- Juan Bautista Istilart, French-born industrialist and inventor
- Federico Lacroze, businessman who created the first railway system in Argentina, born to French father
- María Amalia Lacroze de Fortabat, businesswoman and art collector, with distant French ancestry through her paternal great-grandfather
- Inés Lafuente, entrepreneur and philanthropist, daughter of Amalia Lacroze de Fortabat, with remote French ancestry through both lines of her family
- Anacarsis Lanús, entrepreneur considered one of the wealthiest men in Argentina in the 1850s, born to French father
- Juan Carlos Lectoure, owner of Luna Park arena
- Guy Comte Maingard, Aristocrat French-born Businessman married to Delia Alvarez de Toledo. The Maingard family was among the two hundred founding families and original shareholders of the Banque de France.
- Pedro Mosoteguy, Owner and founder of the Bagley company and the San Martín del Tabacal agro-industrial complex. Considered one of the wealthiest men in Argentina in the 1900s
- Pierre Noyer Monmayou, Landowner and financier, with familial ties to the Mosoteguy family. Founder of Fabre Montmayou, a renowned Argentine winery.
- Pedro Olegario Luro Pradère, businessman who created the first hunting reserve in Argentina, born to French parents
- Santos Manfredi, French-born businessman

== Education ==
- Pablo Bazerque, professor and researcher
- Enrique Butty, engineer and professor
- Ignacio Martín Cloppet, lawyer and professor, with distant French ancestry through both lines of his family
- José Manuel Estrada, professor and thinker, with French ancestry through his maternal grandparents
- Amédée Jacques, French-born pedagogue and philosopher
- Alfredo Labougle, economist and professor, with French ancestry through his paternal grandfather
- Ernesto Laclau, political theorist
- Luis Laporte, engineer who founded the first Industrial School in Argentina
- Guillermo Lariguet, philosopher and professor
- Alberto Larroque, French-born jurist and professor
- Guillermo Lousteau Heguy, professor
- Jacques de Mahieu, French-born anthropologist and professor, Nazi collaborator in Vichy France who fled to Argentina through the ratlines
- Florencia Saintout, professor and dean of the Journalism Faculty of the National University of La Plata, Deputy of Buenos Aires Province since 2017
- Alberto Sauret, professor of cinema and philosophy
- Antonio Vázquez Vialard, lawyer and professor

== Entertainment ==
=== Actors ===
- Alberto Anchart (father), theater and film actor
- Alberto Anchart, actor
- Marquesa Anchart, actress
- Gogó Andreu, actor, with French ancestry through his mother's line
- Tono Andreu, film actor, with French ancestry through his mother's line
- María Armand, actress
- Alicia Aymont, actress
- Alberto Barcel, actor
- Pablo Bardauil, film actor and director
- Bérénice Bejo, actress
- Lola Berthet, TV series and telenovelas actress
- César Bertrand, actor, born in Uruguay
- René Bertrand, theater actor and director, son of César Bertrand
- Héctor Bidonde, actor and director
- Floria Bloise, actress
- Beatriz Bonnet, actress, awarded with five Martín Fierro Awards throughout her career on television
- Lalo Bouhier, actor
- Nina Briand, actress
- Roberto Casaux, theater actor, born to French parents
- Segundo Cernadas, telenovela actor, with remote French ancestry through his maternal great-great-great-grandparents
- Arnoldo Chamot, actor
- Hugo Chemin, actor
- Darío Cossier, theater actor
- Juan Carlos Croharé, actor
- Gastón Dalmau, actor and singer known for his role in soap opera Casi Ángeles
- Amery Darbón, actress
- Eva Dongé, actress
- Francisco Ducasse, theater actor and director, born to French parents
- Chola Duby, actress
- Nestor Ducó, actor
- Zoe Ducós, actress
- Graciela Dufau, actress
- Ulises Dumont, film, television and theater actor
- María Dupláa, actress, niece of Nancy Dupláa, with remote French ancestry through her paternal great-great-grandparents
- Nancy Dupláa, actress, with distant French ancestry through her paternal great-grandparents
- Ricardo Dupont, actor
- Susana Dupré, actress
- Delia Durruty, actress
- Fausto Etchegoin, actor
- Elba Fonrouge, actress
- Maurice Jouvet, French-born film actor
- Mónica Jouvet, actress, daughter of Maurice Jouvet
- Juan Laborde, radio and film actor
- Lydia Lamaison, actress
- Libertad Lamarque, film actress, born to French Uruguayan father
- Esteban Lamothe, actor
- Claudia Lapacó, actress and singer, born to French mother
- Víctor Laplace, film actor
- Anita Larronde, model and actress
- Susana Latou, actress
- Pedro Laxalt, French-born film actor
- Melania Lenoir, actress
- Ivonne Lescaut, actress
- Mona Maris, actress, born to French father
- Victoria Maurette, actress and singer, known for her role in telenovela Rebelde Way
- Jean Pierre Noher, French-born film and television actor
- Michel Noher, TV series actor, son of Jean Pierre Noher
- Barry Norton, actor, born to French Uruguayan father and French mother
- Aída Olivier, actress and dancer
- Camila Perissé, actress
- Celestino Petray, actor
- Silvia Peyrou, actress
- Malena Pichot, stand-up comedian and actress
- Jean Pierre Reguerraz, actor, born to French parents
- Juana Repetto, actress, granddaughter of Ambar La Fox
- Gastón Ricaud, TV series actor
- Mariana Richaudeau, actress
- George Rigaud, actor, born to French mother
- Walter Soubrié, actor
- Beatriz Thibaudin, actress
- Juana Viale, actress, with French ancestry through her maternal grandfather
- Manuel Vignau, actor and playwright

=== Musicians ===
- Eduardo Arolas, tango bandoneon player, born to French parents
- Susana Baron Supervielle, musician, born to French father and French Uruguayan mother
- Sandra Baylac, rock singer
- Antonio Birabent, singer and actor, son of Moris Birabent
- Mauricio "Moris" Birabent, rock musician
- Francisco Bochatón, rock singer
- Guillermo Bordarampé, musician from rock band Arco Iris
- Fabiana Cantilo, rock singer, with remote French ancestry through both lines of her family
- Javier Caumont, musician, son of César Bertrand
- Carmen Duval, tango singer
- Ulises Eyherabide, Christian rock singer
- Osvaldo Favrot, guitarist
- Sol Gabetta, cellist, born to French mother
- Carlos Gardel, French-born singer and actor, considered the most famous figure of tango
- Carlos Guichandut, opera singer
- Pablo Guyot, musician
- Víctor Heredia, folk singer
- Emmanuel Horvilleur, singer, born to French father
- Gabriel Jolivet, rock guitarist, son of René Jolivet
- Pocho Lapouble, jazz drummer and composer
- David Lebón, rock singer, with French ancestry on his father's side
- Paz Lenchantin, bass guitarist of The Pixies
- Elsa Marval, opera singer, born to French father
- Sandra Mihanovich, rock singer, daughter of Mónica Cahen D'Anvers, with French ancestry through her maternal grandfather
- Carlos Montbrun Ocampo, conductor and composer, with French ancestry on his father's line
- Bambi Moreno Charpentier, bass guitarist from pop band Tan Biónica
- Chano Moreno Charpentier, singer from pop band Tan Biónica
- Fernando Otero, pianist and composer, with French ancestry through his maternal grandfather
- Paula Nenette Pepin, French-born composer and pianist
- César "Banana" Pueyrredón, pop-rock singer, with remote French ancestry through his paternal great-great-great-grandfather
- Rodrigo Ratier, composer and pianist
- Mercedes Sosa, folk singer, with French ancestry through her maternal grandfather
- Ricardo Soulé, musician from rock band Vox Dei

=== Other entertainers ===
- Harry d'Abbadie d'Arrast, film director and screenwriter, born to French father
- Ambar La Fox, vedette
- Manuel Antín, film director and screenwriter
- Valeria Archimó, theater dancer and choreographer
- May Avril, French-born vedette
- Jorge Beillard, journalist and TV host
- Eduardo Biscayart, TV sports reporter
- Mónica Cahen D'Anvers, journalist and TV host, born to French father
- Paulette Christian, French-born vedette and actress
- Esteban Courtalón, cinematographer
- Teté Coustarot, model and TV host
- Andrés Decaud, French-born film director and set designer
- Denise Dumas, model and TV host, with remote French ancestry through her paternal great-great-grandparents
- Marie-Anne Erize, model who disappeared during the last dictatorship, born to French parents
- Baby Etchecopar, radio and TV host
- Valentina Ferrer, model and Argentina pageant at 2014 Miss Universe
- Néstor Gaffet, movie producer and screenwriter
- René Jolivet, TV host
- Sergio Lapegüe, radio and TV host
- Agustín Mahieu, film critic and director
- Julia Michelón, radio and TV host
- Alina Moine, journalist and TV host
- Xénia Monty, French-born vedette
- Pampita, model
- Ivo Pelay, playwright
- Juan Carlos Pérez Loizeau, journalist and TV host
- Eugène Py, French-born cameraman, cinematographer and film director, considered the founding pioneer of Argentine cinema
- Reina Reech, dancer and choreographer, daughter of Ambar La Fox
- Juan Carlos Rousselot, announcer and TV host
- Jérôme Savary, director, born to French father
- Daniel Tinayre, French-born film director, screenwriter and producer
- Marcela Tinayre, TV host, daughter of Daniel Tinayre
- Paulina Trotz, model, with French ancestry through her mother's line

== Explorers and pioneers ==
- Clément Cabanettes, French-born co-founder of Pigüé
- Augusto Lasserre, founder of Ushuaia, born to French father
- Pedro Luro, French-born rancher and pioneer settler in the southern Pampas
- Ernest Rouquaud, French-born merchant and explorer in Patagonia

== Journalism ==
- Ana Baron, journalist, with French ancestry through her paternal grandparents
- Víctor Ego Ducrot, journalist
- Félix Fouiller, journalist
- Rolando Goyaud, journalist and research scientist
- Edmundo Guibourg, journalist and theater critic
- Gabriela Laperrière de Coni, French-born journalist and public health activist
- Marcelo Larraquy, journalist
- Charles Lescat, far-right newspaper editor and journalist, Nazi collaborator under German-occupied France, born to French parents
- Horacio Otheguy, journalist
- Susana Viau, journalist and political columnist

== Laws and politics ==
=== Activists ===
- María Esther Biscayart de Tello, human rights activist whose three sons disappeared during the last dictatorship
- Alfredo Alberto Curutchet, lawyer of the ERP and activist who was killed by the Triple A
- Beltrán Gambier, lawyer and activist
- Eduardo Héctor Garat, activist with Montoneros who disappeared during the last dictatorship

=== Deputies and senators ===
- Marcelino Augier, Deputy and interim Governor of Catamarca, with French ancestry through his paternal grandfather
- Uladislao Augier, Deputy of Catamarca, with French ancestry through his paternal grandfather
- Salvador Benedit, Deputy of Buenos Aires (1898–1904), member of the Argentine Industrial Union, born to French parents
- Enzo Bordabehere, Senator of Santa Fe
- Pedro Braillard Poccard, Senator of Corrientes since 2015
- Juan Fernando Brügge, Deputy of Córdoba since 2015, with French ancestry through his mother's line
- Juan Cabandié, Deputy of Buenos Aires since 2013 and human rights activist
- Antonino Cambaceres, Senator of Buenos Aires (1882–1889), born to French father
- Albor Cantard, Deputy of Santa Fe since 2017
- Alberto María Fonrouge, Senator of Buenos Aires Province (1973–1976), with distant French ancestry through his paternal great-grandfather
- José Genoud, Senator of Mendoza from 1986 to 2001
- Emilio Gouchón, Deputy of Buenos Aires from 1896 to 1906
- Oscar Laborde, Deputy in the Mercosur Parliament for Argentina since 2016, Deputy of Buenos Aires (1998–1999)
- Ricardo Guillermo Leconte, Senator (1983–1987), Governor (1987–1991) and Deputy (1991–1995) of Corrientes, with distant French ancestry through his paternal French Brazilian great-grandfather
- Leopoldo Moreau, Deputy of Buenos Aires since 2017
- Rodolfo Tailhade, Deputy of Buenos Aires since 2015
- Gerónimo Vargas Aignasse, Deputy of Tucumán from 2003 to 2011
- Guillermo Vargas Aignasse, Senator of Tucumán from 1973 until his disappearance in 1976

=== Diplomats ===
- Luis Irigoyen, diplomat, with French ancestry through his paternal grandfather
- Ricardo Gastón del Carmen Labougle Carranza, diplomat, with French ancestry through his paternal grandfather
- Roberto Levillier, diplomat

=== Military junta ===
- César Napoleón Ayrault, de facto Federal Interventor of Misiones from 1959 to 1962
- Adolfo Bioy, de facto Minister of Foreign Affairs and Worship (1931–1932), born to French parents
- Emilio A. Bonnecarrére, de facto Interventor of Buenos Aires from 1955 to 1958
- José Rafael Cáceres Monié, de facto Minister of Defense (1969–1972), with French ancestry through his maternal grandparents
- Carlos Chasseing, de facto Federal Interventor of Córdoba from 1976 to 1979
- Emilio Miguel Roberto Daireaux, de facto Judge of the Supreme Court, with distant French ancestry through his paternal great-grandparents
- Conrado Etchebarne, de facto Minister of Justice (1969–1970)
- Rómulo Etcheverry Boneo, de facto Minister of Justice (1944–1945), with French ancestry through his paternal grandfather
- Emilio Gueret, de facto Federal Interventor of Misiones from June to October 1962
- Raúl Lacabanne, de facto Federal Interventor of Córdoba from 1974 to 1975
- Carlos Lacoste, interim de facto President of Argentina from 11 to 21 December 1981
- Alejandro Agustín Lanusse, de facto President from 1971 to 1973, with distant French ancestry through his paternal great-grandfather
- Antonio Roberto Lanusse, de facto Minister of Defense (1966–1967), with distant French ancestry through his paternal great-grandfather
- Ernesto Jorge Lanusse, de facto Minister of Defense (March to April 1962), de facto Minister of Agriculture (1972–1973), with distant French ancestry through his paternal great-grandfather
- Dardo Pérez Guilhou, de facto Minister of Education (1969–1970)
- Jaime Perriaux, de facto Minister of Justice (1970–1971)
- Alfredo Saint-Jean, interim de facto President of Argentina from 18 June to 1 July 1982
- Ibérico Saint-Jean, de facto Governor of Buenos Aires from 1976 to 1981
- Lorenzo Sigaut, de facto Minister of Economy (1981)

=== Ministers ===
- Federico Álvarez de Toledo, Minister of Navy under Hipólito Yrigoyen (1916–1919), President of the National Bank from 1921 to 1924, born to French mother
- Enrique Berduc, Minister of Economy under Julio Argentino Roca (1900–1901), born to French parents
- Onofre Betbeder, twice Minister of Navy under Julio Argentino Roca (1901–1904) and José Figueroa Alcorta (1906–1910), born to French father
- Amado Boudou, Minister of Economy (2009–2011) and Vice President (2011–2015) under Cristina Fernández de Kirchner, sentenced to five years and 10 months in prison, in one of the most notorious corruption cases during the Kirchner presidency, with French ancestry through his paternal grandfather
- Patricia Bullrich, Minister of Security under Mauricio Macri since 2015, with remote French ancestry through her maternal great-great-grandparents
- Luis Duhau, Minister of Agriculture under Agustín P. Justo (1933–1935), born to French parents
- Roberto Manuel Dupeyron, Minister of Public Services under Juan Perón (1952–1955)
- Roberto Etchepareborda, Minister of Foreign Affairs and Worship under Arturo Frondizi (1961–1962)
- Luis Miguel Etchevehere, Minister of Agriculture under Mauricio Macri since 2017, with remote French ancestry through his paternal great-great-great-grandfather
- Jorge Faurie, Minister of Foreign Affairs under Mauricio Macri since 2017
- Belisario Gache Pirán, Minister of Justice and Public Instruction under Juan Domingo Perón (1946–149)
- Tomás Le Breton, Minister of Agriculture under Marcelo T. de Alvear (1922–1925)
- Martín Lousteau, Minister of Economy under Cristina Fernández de Kirchner (2007–2008)
- Carlos Meyer Pellegrini, Minister of Public Works under Roque Sáenz Peña (1913–1914), with French ancestry through his maternal grandfather
- Honorio Pueyrredón, Minister of Agriculture (1916–1917), Minister of Foreign Affairs and Worship (1917–1922) under Hipólito Yrigoyen, with distant French ancestry through his paternal great-grandfather
- Domingo Salaberry, Minister of Finance under Hipólito Yrigoyen (1916–1922), born to French father
- Juan Vital Sourrouille, Minister of Economy under Raúl Alfonsín (1985–1989), with French ancestry through his paternal grandparents

=== Presidents ===
- Carlos Pellegrini, President of Argentina from 1890 to 1892, born to French father
- Juan Perón, twice President of Argentina from 1946 to 1955, and from 1973 to 1974, with French ancestry through his French Uruguayan paternal grandmother
- Roque Sáenz Peña, President of Argentina from 1910 to 1914, with French ancestry through his French Uruguayan maternal grandfather
- Hipólito Yrigoyen, twice President of Argentina from 1916 to 1922, and from 1928 to 1930, born to French father

=== Provincial representatives ===
- Carlos Alric, Governor of San Luis from 1917 to 1921, born to French father
- Ricardo Andreau, Governor of Chaco from 1929 to 1930
- Gustavo Bordet, Governor of Entre Ríos since 2015
- Carlos Bouquet Roldán, Governor of Neuquén from 1903 to 1906
- Ángel Carnota, Governor of Santa Cruz from 1949 to 1952, with French ancestry through his paternal grandmother
- Silvestre Cau, provisional Governor of Jujuy in 1879, born to French father
- Adolfo Contte, Deputy (1896–1900) then Governor (1919–1921) of Corrientes
- José Camilo Crotto, Governor of Buenos Aires from 1918 to 1921, born to French mother
- Juan Daract, Governor of San Luis from 1913 to 1917, son of Mauricio Daract, with French ancestry through his paternal grandfather
- Justo Daract, six times Governor of San Luis between 1854 and 1867, born to French father
- Mauricio Daract, twice Governor of San Luis between 1852 and 1854, born to French father
- Ricardo Joaquín Durand, twice Governor of Salta from 1952 to 1955, and from 1963 to 1966
- Luis Lorenzo Etchevehere, Governor of Entre Ríos from 1931 to 1935, with French ancestry through his paternal grandfather
- León Guillet, Governor of San Luis from 1922 to 1926, born to French parents
- Anacarsis Lanús, Governor of Chaco from 1911 to 1914, with French ancestry through his paternal grandfather
- Juan José Lanusse, Governor of Misiones from 1896 to 1905, born to French father
- Mario Moine, Governor of Entre Ríos from 1991 to 1995
- Juan Carlos Neveu, Governor of La Pampa from 1949 to 1951
- Juan Luis Nougués, Governor of Tucumán from 1932 to 1934, with distant French ancestry through his paternal great-grandfather
- Luis Nougués, Governor of Tucumán from 1906 to 1909, with French ancestry through his paternal grandfather
- Miguel M. Nougués, Governor (1880–1882) and Senator (1883–1892) of Tucumán, born to French father
- Horacio Rodríguez Larreta, Chief of Government of Buenos Aires since 2015, with remote French ancestry on his father's side
- José Graciano Sortheix, Governor of Tucumán from 1928 to 1930, born to French parents
- Carlos Sylvestre Begnis, twice Governor of Santa Fe from 1958 to 1962, and from 1973 to 1976
- Arístides Villanueva, Governor of Mendoza from 1870 to 1873, with remote French ancestry through his maternal great-great-grandfather

=== Public figures ===
- María Lorenza Barreneche, First Lady of Argentina from 1983 to 1989, with distant French ancestry through her maternal great-grandfather
- Silvia Martorell, First Lady of Argentina from 1963 to 1966, with distant French ancestry through her paternal great-grandfather
- Queen Máxima of the Netherlands, queen consort of the Netherlands, with remote French ancestry through her maternal great-great-grandparents
- Pilar Nores de García, twice First Lady of Peru from 1985 to 1990, and from 2006 to 2011, with distant French ancestry through her maternal great-grandparents
- Eva Perón, First Lady of Argentina from 1946 to 1952, with French ancestry through her paternal grandparents

=== Other politicians ===
- Ignacio Álvarez Thomas, military commander and politician of the early 19th century, with French ancestry through his maternal grandfather
- Ismael Bordabehere, student leader
- Julián Bourdeu, French-born politician and justice of the peace
- Mauricio Pastor Daract, judge of the Supreme Court of Justice, with French ancestry through his paternal grandfather
- Leandro Despouy, human rights lawyer and politician
- Che Guevara, major figure of the Cuban Revolution, with remote French ancestry through his maternal great-great-grandfather
- Eduardo Lahitte, politician, born in Uruguay to French father
- Pablo Lanusse, lawyer and Federal Interventor of Santiago del Estero from 2004 to 2005
- Santiago de Liniers, French-born officer and viceroy of the Río de la Plata
- Julio César Oyhanarte, jurist who served twice as a Justice of the Supreme Court of Argentina, with French-Basque ancestry
- Alejo Peyret, French-born politician and writer
- Juan Martín de Pueyrredón, general and politician of the early 19th century, born to French father
- José Rondeau, political figure of the Argentine War of Independence, born to French father
- Luis Vernet, Governor of the Malvinas Islands (1829–1831), born in Germany in a French Huguenot family
- Pablo Vrillaud, student leader, born to French father

== Literature ==
- Carlos Alvarado-Larroucau, writer
- Jorge Barón Biza, writer, son of Raúl Barón Biza, with distant French ancestry through his paternal great-grandfather
- Raúl Barón Biza, writer, with French ancestry through his paternal grandfather
- Odile Baron Supervielle, writer, born in Uruguay to French father and French Uruguayan mother
- Silvia Baron Supervielle, writer, with French ancestry through her paternal grandparents
- Augusto Belin, writer, born in Chile to French father
- Adolfo Bioy Casares, writer, with French ancestry through his paternal grandparents
- Ivonne Bordelois, poet and writer
- Silvina Bullrich, novelist, with remote French ancestry through her maternal great-great-great-grandfather
- Eugenio Cambaceres, writer, born to French father
- Andrés Chabrillón, poet, born to French parents
- Juan Chassaing, poet, born to French father
- Julio Cortázar, writer, with French ancestry through his maternal grandfather
- Emilio Daireaux, writer and journalist, born in Brazil to French parents
- Godofredo Daireaux, French-born writer
- Max Daireaux, novelist and essayist, son of Emilio Daireaux, with French ancestry through his paternal grandparents
- Daniel Durand, poet
- Juan Filloy, writer, born to French mother
- Martín García Mérou, poet and novelist, born to French mother
- Susana Giqueaux, poet and writer
- Paul Groussac, French-born writer, literary critic, historian and librarian
- José Hernández, poet and author of Martín Fierro, which is considered Argentina's national book, with distant French ancestry through his maternal great-grandfather
- Arturo Jauretche, writer, with French ancestry through his paternal grandfather and his maternal French Brazilian grandmother
- Federico Jeanmaire, writer
- Gregorio de Laferrère, playwright, born to French father
- Roberto de Laferrère, writer, son of Gregorio de Laferrère
- Jorge Lafforgue, writer and literary critic
- Ana Emilia Lahitte, writer
- Nydia Lamarque, poet
- Alejandro Lanoël, writer
- Leopoldo Marechal, writer, born to French Uruguayan father
- Julio Meinvielle, priest and writer
- Conrado Nalé Roxlo, writer, born in a French Uruguayan family
- Silvina Ocampo, poet and writer, with remote French ancestry through her maternal great-great-great-grandfather
- Victoria Ocampo, writer, with remote French ancestry through her maternal great-great-great-grandfather
- Elvira Orphée, writer
- Ulyses Petit de Murat, poet and screenwriter
- Manuel Peyrou, writer
- Pierre Quiroule, French-born anarchist writer
- Alexandrine Rappel, French-born playwright
- Alberto Rougès, philosopher, born to French father
- Susana Thénon, avant-garde poet
- Mario R. Vecchioli, poet, born to French mother

== Military ==
- Napoleón Berreaute, soldier who fought during the Paraguayan War
- Hipólito Bouchard, French-born sailor and militar who fought during the Argentine War of Independence
- Federico de Brandsen, French-born colonel who fought in the wars for independence
- Jorge Cáceres, former chief of the Argentine Federal Police, assassinated by the leftist terrorist group Montoneros, with French ancestry through his maternal grandparents
- Héctor Canavery, lieutenant in the Argentine Army who took part in the Conquest of the Desert, with French ancestry through his maternal grandfather
- Indalecio Chenaut, soldier who fought in the Cisplatine War and in the Argentine Civil Wars, with distant French ancestry through his paternal great-grandfather
- Federico R. Cuñado, navy commander, with French ancestry through his maternal grandfather
- Carlos Daireaux, vice admiral of the Argentine Navy, former de facto Minister of Navy, with French ancestry through his paternal grandparents
- Tomás Adolfo Ducó, soldier involved in the 1943 Argentine coup d'état
- Félix Dufourq, sailor, born to French father
- Juan José Falconier, aviator who died during the South Atlantic Conflict
- Julio Nicolás José Fonrouge de Lesseps, French-born sailor who fought during the Argentine Civil Wars
- Francisco Fourmantin, French-born sailor who fought during the Cisplatine War and the Uruguayan Civil War
- Ángel Hubac, French-born sailor who fought during the Argentine War of Independence and the Argentine Civil Wars
- Esteban Mestivier, French-born Military and Civil commander in the Malvinas Islands
- Enrique Paillardell, French-born soldier
- Adolfo Philippeaux, soldier
- Jean Simon, French-born interim Commander of the Malvinas Islands (1833)

== Religion ==
- Agustín Barrere, Bishop of Tucumán
- Moisés Julio Blanchoud, Catholic prelate
- Fermín Emilio Lafitte, French-born Archbishop of Córdoba
- Esteban María Laxague, Bishop of Viedma
- Pedro María Laxague, Bishop of Zárate-Campana
- Eduardo O'Gorman, Catholic priest, with French ancestry through his paternal grandmother

== Science ==
- Alberto Althabe, gynecologist
- José Antonio Balseiro, physicist, with French ancestry through his maternal grandparents
- Francisco Beuf, French-born astronomer
- Constante Bonfils, agronomist and soil scientist
- Aimé Bonpland, French-born botanist
- Auguste Bravard, French-born palaeontologist
- Carlos Cassaffousth, engineer, born to French mother
- Catherine Cesarsky, French-born astronomer
- Emilio R. Coni, physician, born to French parents
- Alberto Cormillot, nutritionist, with French ancestry through his paternal grandfather
- Francisco Erize, natural scientist and conservationist, with French ancestry through his maternal grandmother
- Enrique Hermitte, engineer
- Bernardo Houssay, physiologist, Nobel Prize winner (1947), born to French parents
- Fernando Lahille, French-born zoologist
- Luis Federico Leloir, doctor and biochemist, Nobel Prize winner (1970), born in France to Argentine parents who both had French ancestry
- Guillermo A. Lemarchand, physician
- Bartolomé Loudet, French-born chemist and pioneer of photography
- Emilio Loudet, physician, son of Bartolomé Loudet and a French Argentine mother
- Osvaldo Loudet, physician, son of Bartolomé Loudet and a French Argentine mother
- Osvaldo Loudet (son), physician, son of Osvaldo Loudet
- Alicia Lourteig, botanist, born to French father
- Alicia Moreau de Justo, physician, born in Great Britain to French parents
- Enrique Pichon-Rivière, psychiatrist, born in Switzerland to French parents
- Adela Ringuelet, astrophysicist and astronomer
- Raúl Adolfo Ringuelet, zoologist
- Emilio Solanet, research scientist who improved the Argentine Criollo horse, born to French father
- Adolfo Trefault, engineer, born to French father

== Sports ==
=== Auto racing ===
- Sergio Alaux, racing driver
- Comte George Raphaël Béthenod de Montbressieux, racing driver, born to French father
- Juan Manuel Bordeu, racing driver
- Sacha Fenestraz, French-born racing driver
- Carlos Menditeguy, racing driver and polo player, born to French Uruguayan father and French Argentine mother

=== Field hockey ===
- Manuel Brunet, field hockey player
- Carla Dupuy, field hockey player
- Juan Pablo Hourquebie, field hockey player
- Mercedes Margalot, field hockey player
- Gonzalo Peillat, field hockey player
- Victoria Sauze, field hockey player
- María Alejandra Tucat, field hockey player

=== Football ===
- Nicolás Abot, football player
- Pablo Aimar, football player
- Mariano Berriex, football player
- Fernando Bonjour, football player
- Martín Bonjour, football player
- Luis Alberto Bonnet, football player
- Jorge Bontemps, football player
- Fabio Edgardo Boujon, football player
- Héctor de Bourgoing, football player
- Martín Bouvier, football player
- Lucas Boyé, football player
- Mario Boyé, football player
- Federico Broin, football player
- Darío Cabrol, football player
- Héctor Candau, football player
- Pedro Calomino, football player, born of both French parents whose real name was Fournol
- Esteban Cambiasso-Deleau, football player
- Nicolas Cambiasso-Deleau, football player
- Alberto Cazaubón, football player
- Christian Cellay, football player
- José Chamot, football player
- Nereo Champagne, football player
- Nestor Combin, football player
- Lionel Coudannes, football player, son of Pedro Coudannes
- Pedro Coudannes, football player
- Eduardo Coudet, football player
- Lucas Coyette, football player
- Walter Coyette, football player
- Facundo Curuchet, football player
- Ceferino Denis, football player
- Germán Denis, football player
- Héctor Desvaux, football player
- Alfredo Di Stéfano, football player, with French ancestry through his maternal grandfather
- Ariel Donnet, football player
- Matías Donnet, football player
- Sebastián Dubarbier, football player
- Juan Eluchans, football player
- Tulio Etchemaite, football player
- Carlos Alberto Etcheverry, football player
- Iván Etevenaux, football player
- Francisco Feuillassier, football player
- Ubaldo Fillol, football player, Fillol is an Occitan name meaning godson
- Santiago Feuillassier, football player
- Santiago Fusilier, football player
- Pablo Garnier, football player
- Oscar Garré, football player
- Hugo Gatti-Caire, football player
- Luciano Gondou, football player
- Patricio Gómez Barroche, football player
- Luciano Goux, football player
- Marcelo Goux, football player
- Federico Higuaín, football player, son of Jorge Higuaín
- Gonzalo Higuaín, French-born football player, son of Jorge Higuaín
- Jorge Higuaín, football player, with distant French ancestry
- Juan Imbert, football player
- Jonathan Jacquet, football player
- Cristian Jeandet, football player
- Federico Jourdan, football player
- Ignacio Lachalde, football player
- Julio César Laffatigue, football player
- César-Auguste Laraignée, football player
- Pedro Larraquy, football player
- Joaquín Larrivey, football player
- Mariana Larroquette, football player
- Christian Limousin, football player
- José María Lorant, football player and coach
- Félix Loustau, football player
- Juan Carlos Loustau, football referee
- Patricio Loustau, football referee
- Wálter Maladot, football player
- Oscar Malbernat, football player
- Alejandro Manchot, football player
- Juan Maraude, football player
- Julio Marchant, football player
- Juan Ignacio Mercier, football player
- Pablo Mouche, football player
- Luciano Nequecaur, football player
- Enzoi Noir, football player
- Ricardo Noir, football player
- Matías Nouet, football player
- Catriel Orcellet, football player
- Oscar Passet, football player
- Carlos Peucelle, football player
- Pablo Pezombe, football player
- Jonathan Phillippe, football player
- Cristian Piarrou, football player
- Ángel Rambert, football player, with French ancestry through his paternal grandfather
- Sebastián Rambert, football player, son of Ángel Rambert, with distant French ancestry through his paternal grandfather
- Jonathan Felipe Rougier, football player
- Matías Sarraute, football player
- Luis Solignac, football player
- Matias Soulé, football player
- Joaquín Susvielles, football player
- Marcelo Tamalet, football player
- Juan Carlos Trebucq, football player
- David Trezeguet, French-born football player, son of Jorge Trezeguet, with French ancestry through his paternal great-great-grandfather
- Jorge Trezeguet, football player, with distant French ancestry through his paternal great-grandfather
- Carlos Trullet, football player
- Juan Sebastian Veron, football player
- Matías Viguet, football player

=== Handball ===
- Gonzalo Carou, handball player
- Sebastien Dechamps, handball player
- Guido Roumec, handball player
- Hernan Poncet, handball player
- Diego Simonet, handball player
- Pablo Simonet, handball player
- Sebastián Simonet, handball player

=== Rugby ===
- Alejandro Abadie, rugby player
- Antonio Ahualli de Chazal, rugby player
- Lisandro Ahualli de Chazal, rugby player
- Santiago Álvarez Fourcade, rugby player
- Guillermo Angaut, rugby player
- Germán Aristide, rugby player
- Gonzalo Bertranou, rugby player
- José Cilley, rugby player
- Julio Clement, rugby player
- Andrés Courreges, rugby player and coach
- Martín Durand, rugby player
- Bautista Delguy, rugby player
- Lucio de Chazal, rugby player
- Leopoldo de Chazal, rugby player
- Lucas Favre, rugby player
- Juan Ignacio Gauthier, rugby player
- Juan Cruz Guillemaín, rugby player
- Martín Grau, rugby player
- Roberto Grau, rugby player
- Daniel Hourcade, rugby coach and former player
- Juan Imhoff, rugby player (Alsatian)
- Pedro Imhoff, rugby player (Alsatian)
- Eduardo Laborde, rugby player
- Alfredo Lalanne, rugby player
- Ignacio Larrague, rugby player
- Ricardo Le Fort, rugby player
- Fernando Morel, rugby player
- Santiago Montagner, rugby player
- Martín Palou, rugby player
- Agustín Pichot, rugby player
- Martin Sansot, rugby player
- Sebastián Salvat, rugby player
- Ricardo Sauze, rugby player
- Juan Bautista Segonds, rugby player
- Joaquín Tuculet, rugby player
- Segundo Tuculet, rugby player
- Hernan Vidou, rugby player
- Christian Viel, rugby player
- Alberto Vernet Basualdo, rugby player

=== Swimming ===
- Alberto Bourdillón, swimmer
- Jeannette Campbell, French-born swimmer
- Alejandro Lecot, swimmer
- Jorge Moreau, swimmer
- Leopoldo Tahier, swimmer

=== Tennis ===
- Mailen Auroux, tennis player
- Carlos Berlocq, tennis player
- Marcelo Charpentier, tennis player
- José Luis Clerc, tennis player
- Sebastián Decoud, tennis player

=== Other sports ===
- José Manuel Brunet, fencer
- Carmelo Camet, French-born fencer, son of Francisco Camet
- Francisco Camet, fencer
- Gabriel Curuchet, road bicycle racer and track cyclist
- Juan Curuchet, road bicycle racer and track cyclist
- Juan Carlos Dasque, sport shooter
- Roberto Luis Debarnot, chess player
- Vito Dumas, single-handed sailor
- Amelia Fournel, sport shooter
- Carlos Guimard, chess player
- Bautista Heguy, polo player
- Gonzalo Heguy, polo player
- Gonzalo Pieres Sr, polo player
- Gonzalo Pieres Jr, polo player
- Mariano Aguerre, polo player
- Eduardo Lausse, boxer
- Gabriel Martirén, French-born Basque pelota player, inventor of pelota goma
- Lucien Petit-Breton, French-born racing cyclist
- Alan Pichot, chess player
- Luis Soubié, sailboat racer
- Bruno Laraque, basketball player
- Walter Garrone, basketball player
- Roberto Viau, basketball player

== Visual arts ==
=== Architects ===
- Pedro Benoit, architect, born to French father
- Pierre Benoît, French-born architect
- Próspero Catelin, French-born architect and engineer
- León Dourge, French-born architect who designed the Palacio Duhau
- Louis Dubois, French-born architect and painter
- Arturo Dubourg, architect
- Jorge Ferrari Hardoy, architect and designer
- Eduardo Le Monnier, French-born architect
- Carlos Malbranche, architect, born to French parents
- Patricio Pouchulu, architect

=== Comic book artists ===
- Louis Cazeneuve, comic book artist
- Liniers, cartoonist
- Caloi, cartoonist
- Carlos Roume, cartoonist, born to French father
- Tute, cartoonist, son of Caloi

=== Painters ===
- Numa Ayrinhac, French-born painter
- Norma Bessouet, painter
- Ernest Charton, French-born painter
- Gustavo Cochet, painter, born to French father
- Julio Ducuron, painter, with French ancestry through his paternal grandfather
- Fernando Fader, French-born painter
- Amadeo Gras, French-born painter
- Julio Le Parc, painter and sculptor, with French ancestry through his paternal grandfather
- Miguel Ocampo, painter, with remote French ancestry through his maternal great-great-grandfather
- Charles Pellegrini, French-born painter and engineer
- Prilidiano Pueyrredón, painter, architect, and engineer, with French ancestry through his paternal grandfather
- Guillermo Roux, painter, born to French Uruguayan father

=== Other visual artists ===
- Adolfo Bellocq, printmaker
- Alfonso Fermepin, French-born photographer
- Esteban Gonnet, French-born photographer
- Carlos Thays, French-born landscape architect

== Other ==
- Jeannette Arata de Erize, president of Mozarteum Argentino, with French ancestry through her mother's line
- Federico Biraben, librarian who promoted the use of the Universal Decimal Classification in Argentina, born in Uruguay to French parents
- Jorge Romero Brest, art critic, with French ancestry through his maternal grandmother
- Matilde Díaz Vélez, urbanist and philanthropist, with French ancestry through her maternal grandmother
- Gato Dumas, chef, with distant French ancestry through both lines of his family
- Christophe Krywonis, French-born chef
- Anna Larroucau Laborde de Lucero, French-born educator and philanthropist
- Augusto S. Mallié, historian and director of the National General Archive, born to French father
- Camila O'Gorman, 19th century socialite, with French ancestry through her paternal grandmother
- Marie Anne Périchon de Vandeuil, French-born 19th century socialite, known to be the mistress of viceroy Santiago de Liniers
- Jean Sère, French-born landowner
- Victoria Torni, de facto First Lady of Argentina in the 1940s as the wife of Edelmiro Julián Farrell. Her mother emigrated from France to Argentina.
- José Gabriel Vazeilles, historian

== See also ==
- French immigration to Argentina
