= Augier (name) =

Augier is a French given name and surname. Notable people with this name include:

== Surname ==
- Adrian Augier, St Lucian poet
- Augustin Augier (1758–1825), French priest, teacher and botanist
- Émile Augier (1820–1889), French dramatist
  - Prix Émile Augier, French literary prize
- Jean-Jacques Augier (born 1953), French publisher
- Joanny Augier (1813–1855), French playwright and journalist
- Jordan Augier (born 1994), St Lucian swimmer
- Justine Augier (born 1978), French novelist
- Marc Augier otherwise Saint-Loup (writer) (1908–1990), French fascist and writer
- Philippe Augier (born 1949), French politician
- Serge Augier (born 1969), French writer on Taoism
- Sylvain Augier (1952–2024), French media host
- Uladislao Augier (1826–1908), Argentine politician

== Given name ==
- Augièr Galhard (1540–1592 or 1593), Occitan poet
- Augier Ghislain de Busbecq otherwise Ogier Ghiselin de Busbecq (1522–1592), Flemish diplomat and herbalist
- Guillem Augier Novella otherwise Ogier or Augier de Sant Donat or de Vianes (13th century), Occitan troubadour

== See also ==
- Auger (surname)
- Ogier (disambiguation)
