= Jerudong Park Polo Club =

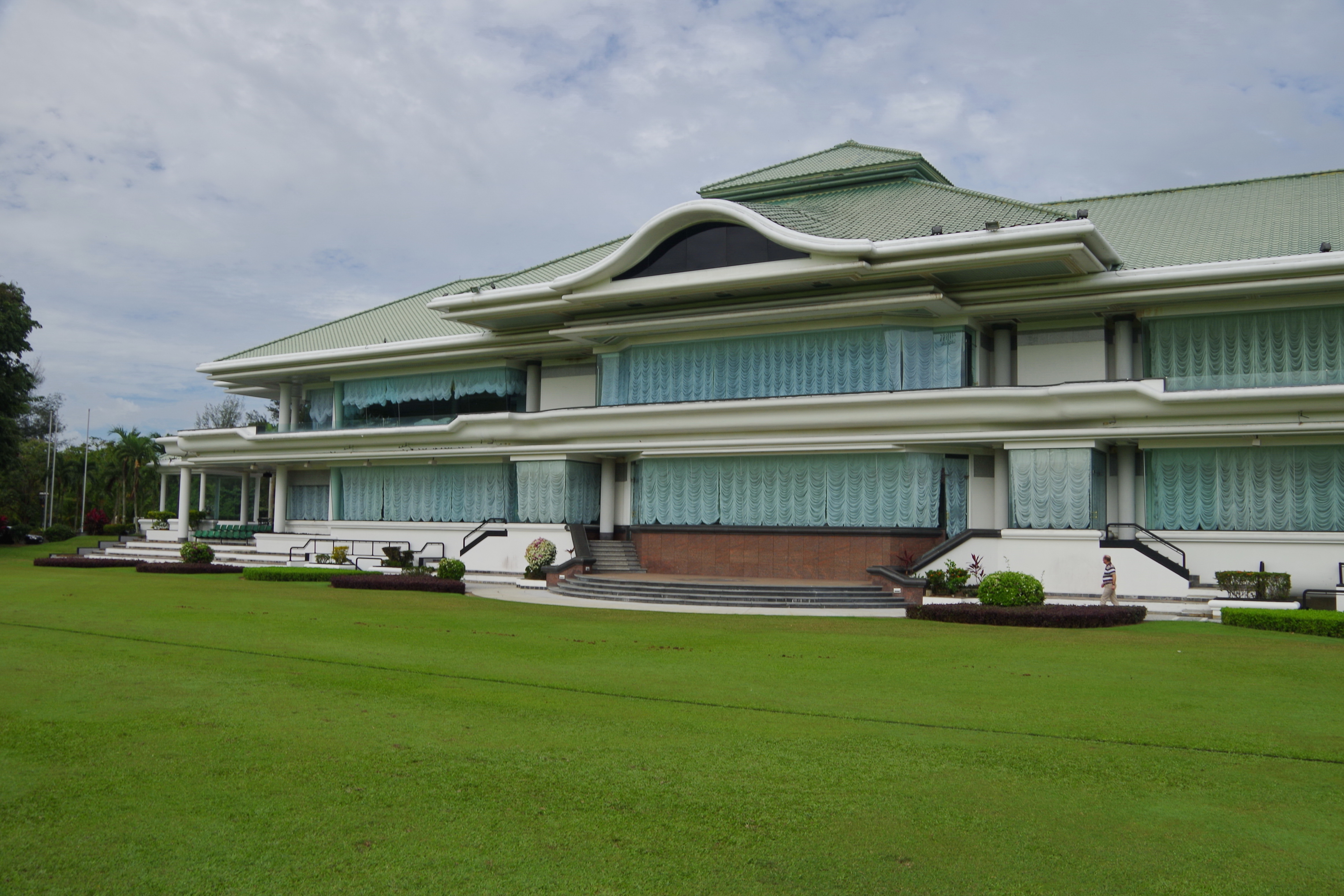
The clubhouse in 2013.

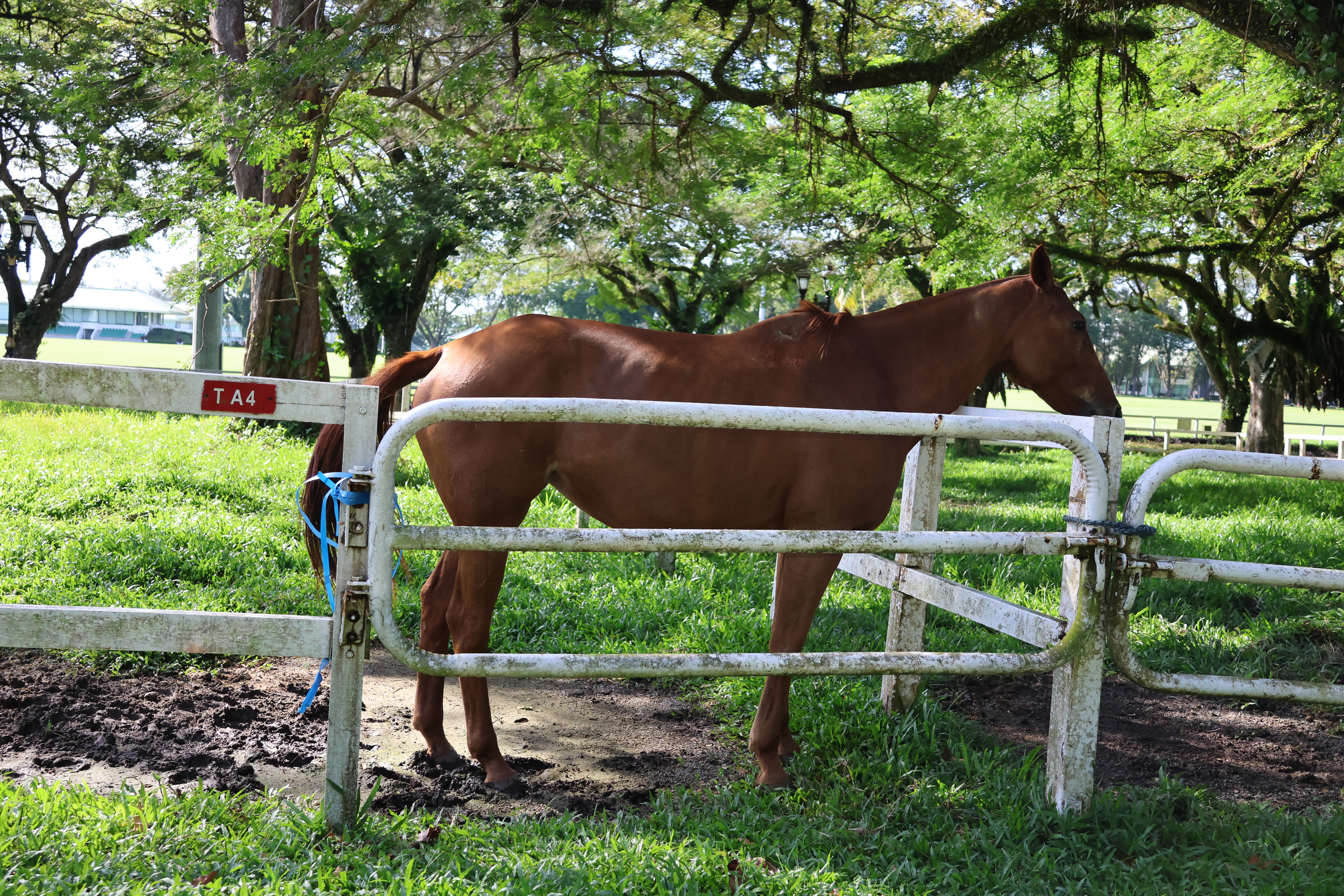
A polo pony in 2023.

The Jerudong Park Polo Club, sometimes abbreviated as the Jerudong Park Polo Club and also known as the Tarindak D' Polo Royal Brunei Polo and Riding Club or the Royal Brunei Polo and Riding Club, is a polo club in Kampong Jerudong, close to Bandar Seri Begawan, the capital of Brunei. It was established in the mid-1990s, on the impetus of Christopher Hanbury, an Irishman who became the Equerry to the Sultan of Brunei in 1994. President Bill Clinton visited the club during his official visit to Brunei in November 2000.
