= Argentine Polo Pony =

Argentine breed of horse

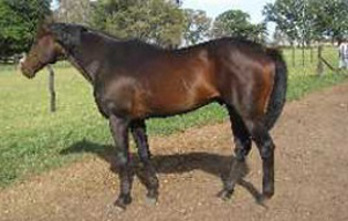
- Other names: Polo Argentino
- Country of origin: Argentina
- Standard: Asociación Argentina de Criadores de Caballos de Polo (in Spanish)
- Use: Polo

Traits
- Height: 1.47–1.56 m

The Argentine Polo Pony (Spanish: Polo Argentino) is the Argentine breed of polo pony. It was recognized in 1984.

== History ==
For a long time, these horses were not recognized as a breed. Although they are often referred to as polo ponies, they have no pony ancestry. They most often originate from crosses between the Thoroughbred and the Criollo, practiced since the 1900s, after polo had been introduced to Argentina by the English around 1890. In the 1930s, the reputation of these horses began to grow, thanks in particular to the quality of their bones. The breed association, the Asociación Argentina de Criadores de Caballos de Polo, was created on 8 August 1984, and has been managing the studbook ever since.

The famous Argentine polo player Adolfo Cambiaso calls on Crestview Genetics to clone his horses. At the end of 2010, a clone of his polo mare Cuartetera was sold at auction for a record $800,000. On 7 December 2013, a cloned twin won the Argentine polo championship for the first time.

== Description ==
CAB International indicates an average height range of 1.47 m to 1.52 m, while the national breed association and the Delachaux guide indicate an average of 1.56 m. Weight ranges from 400 to 500 kg.

The model is that of the light saddle horse. The head, generally straight in profile, is topped by large eyes and attached to a long neck. The shoulders are long, sloping and muscular. The back is short and muscular, as is the rump.

The coat is mostly bay in all shades.

Only horses that have achieved good sporting results in polo are allowed to breed.

== Usage ==
The breed is bred exclusively for polo, but can also be ridden for other equestrian disciplines.

== Bibliography ==
- Hendricks, Bonnie Lou (2007). International Encyclopedia of Horse Breeds (2nd ed.). University of Oklahoma Press. p. 486. ISBN 978-0-8061-3884-8.
- Porter, Valerie; Alderson, Lawrence; Hall, Stephen; Sponenberg, Dan (2016). Mason's World Encyclopedia of Livestock Breeds and Breeding (6th ed.). CAB International. p. 1107. ISBN 978-1-84593-466-8.
- Rousseau, Élise (2014). Tous les chevaux du monde [All the horses in the world] (in French). Delachaux et Niestlé. p. 544. ISBN 978-2-603-01865-1.
