= Oier =

- Gender: masculine
- Language: Basque

Origin
- Meaning: twisted
- Region of origin: Basque Country

Oier is a masculine Basque given name of medieval origin. It means "twisted".

It is among the top ten names for boys born in Basque Country.

People with the name Oier include:

- Oier Aizpurua, Spanish canoeist
- Oier Ibarretxe, Spanish boxer
- Oier Larraínzar, Spanish footballer
- Oier Lazkano, Spanish cyclist
- Oier Llorente, Spanish footballer
- Oier Luengo, Spanish footballer
- Oier Olazábal, Spanish footballer
- Oier Sanjurjo, Spanish footballer
- Oier Zarraga, Spanish footballer
- Oier Zearra, Spanish pelota player

== See also ==
- Ogier (disambiguation)
