= Trix (group) =

Argentine girl group

- Also known as: Las Trillizas de Oro; Las Trillizas; Las Tres Marías; Las Chicas de Oro; Las Marías
- Origin: Buenos Aires, Argentina
- Genres: Disco; Pop; Europop
- Years active: 1969-present
- Labels: Fermata; Sony Music Entertainment Argentina; Jupiter Records; DBX Records S.R.L
- Members: María Emilia Fernández Roussee; María Eugenia Fernández Roussee; María Laura Fernández Rousse

Trix (born July 5, 1960 in Floresta, Buenos Aires, Argentina), is the stage name of the triplet sisters María Emilia Fernández Roussee, María Eugenia Fernández Roussee and María Laura Fernández Rousse.

== Biography ==
Their parents Oscar Fernández and Paulina Alicia Rousse were bank employees. Paulina discovered that she was pregnant with three by taking an X-Ray. Curiously, María Emilia and María Eugenia are twins and María Laura was the last to be born. Their birth caused a sensation at that time since they were the first triplets in Argentina born naturally.

They were born and spent their childhood in the neighborhood of Floresta, Buenos Aires, Argentina and they attended the Instituto Ana María Janer during primary school. Years later they moved to Belgrano, Buenos Aires, Argentina where they attended Colegio Nuestra Señora de la Misericordia.

== Career ==
María Emilia Fernández Roussee, María Eugenia Fernández Roussee and María Laura Fernández Rousse began their career doing Commercials for television when they were just four years old.

In 1968, thanks to the Actor Alejandro Rey, a friend of their uncle Lalo, they made their debut in the famous variety show called Sábados Circulares. At the age of 13, in Venezuela they made a youthful series called Angelitos del Demonio.

In 1976, they presented in Buenos Aires a show called Canta, canta, canta. In 1976, they started a program in Canal 13 called El verano de los chicos.

In 1978 at age 17, they participated in the film El Tío Disparate. After being part of the film, on a flight from Colombia to Argentina, the figure of Las Trillizas appeared on the cover of a magazine. And on the recommendation of Palito Ortega, who was on board that flight, they were hired by Julio Iglesias to do a world tour as his backup singers. After gaining fame through the tour, they began receiving contracts as presenters and entertainers of variety shows.

In 1981, they started making appearances on television shows in Europe like Musikladen. After the success of El Club de Mickey they moved away from television for several years to dedicate themselves to raising their children, but they returned to the small screen with a new children's program called Las Tres Marías.

In 2005, they returned to television as hosts in a program called Estamos como queremos. They were later the hosts of the television program Mañanas Nuestras.

== Personal life ==
- María Emilia Fernández Roussee: She married Clemente Zavaleta in 1981 after eight months of dating. Clemente Zavaleta and María Emilia Fernández Roussee have three children and seven grandchildren:
- Emilia "Mili" Zavaleta (born February 21, 1983). She is married to Santiago Di Benedetto and they have three children:
  - Belisario (born May 8, 2011)
  - Carlota (born October 24, 2013)
  - Augusta (born September 21, 2018)
- Clemente Zavaleta Jr. (born December 3, 1985). He is married to the granddaughter of French tycoon Robert Zellinger of Balkany, Isabelle Strom and they have two daughters:
  - Olympia (born September 6, 2016)
  - Assia Eugenie (born February 18, 2019)
- Sonia "Choni" Zavaleta (born October 17, 1989). She is married to movie director, Isidro Escalante and they have two children:
  - Enero (born November 4, 2023)
  - Rosa (born February 16, 2026)
- María Eugenia Fernández Roussee: She married in 1982 with Horacio Laprida. Horacio Laprida and María Eugenia Fernández Roussee have four children and five grandchildren:
- Eugenia "Geñi" Laprida (June 11, 1984 – June 25, 2018). She was married to the architect, César Bustos and they had two children:
  - César (born October 22, 2007)
  - Cala (born December 1, 2013)
- Horacio Laprida Jr. (born May 12, 1987)
- Laura Laprida (born March 12, 1990). She is married to the industrial designer and carpenter, Eugenio Levis and they have one child:
  - Otto (born August 12, 2025)
- Pilar Laprida (born November 6, 1992). She is married to the graphic designer, Jerónimo Bas and they have two sons:
  - León (born November 2021)
  - Romero (born January 2025)
- María Laura Fernández Rousse: She married in 1983 with Ernesto Trotz. Ernesto Trotz and María Laura Fernández Rousse have three children and nine grandchildren:
- Bárbara Trotz (born February 23, 1985). She is married to Tomás García del Río and they have three children:
  - Paz (born September 27, 2009)
  - Pedro (born February 25, 2016)
  - Azul (born December 20, 2019)
- Paulina Trotz (born June 30, 1986). She is married with the rugby player Gonzalo Tiesi and they have four children:
  - Gonzalo Ignacio (born May 26, 2014)
  - Carlos Emilio (born December 15, 2015)
  - Borja (born October 14, 2020)
  - Esmeralda (born September 21, 2022)
- Ernesto Trotz Jr. (born September 5, 1989). He is married to the model and photographer, Paula Medrano and they have two children:
  - Ernesto Guillermo (born May 29, 2019)
  - Nieves (born October 20, 2022)

María Emilia's daughter, Sonia Zavaleta was a member of the musical group Gretta, with which she edited an EP called "Gretta" and in 2017 she was also part of the cast of Golpe al corazón. She is currently performing as a soloist, whose name is Sonia Z.

María Eugenia's daughter, Laura Laprida is an actress and has been part of great television casts such as Historia de un clan, Golpe al corazón, Campanas en la noche, Rizhoma Hotel from Telefe, and in Millennials from Net TV and Netflix.

They named their male child after their husbands and named their daughters after them and their sisters. In private, each one has a nickname commonly used by members of their families: by their children they are nicknamed "Mila" (Emilia), "Coca" (Eugenia) and "Lula" (Laura), and for their grandchildren "Meme" (Emilia), "Coca" (Eugenia) and "Iaia" (Laura).
