= Ogier (disambiguation) =

Ogier the Dane is a figure from medieval legend.

Ogier may also refer to:

- Ogier de Busbecq, Austrian diplomat to the Ottoman Empire
- Guillem Augier Novella, medieval troubadour
- Ogier (law firm), a Jersey-based law firm
- Ogier (The Wheel of Time), a fictional race of non-human creatures in The Wheel of Time series
- Hoger de Laon, music theorist and abbot

== People with the surname ==
- Barbara Ogier (1648–1720), Flemish playwright
- Bulle Ogier (born 1939), French film actor
- Sébastien Ogier, French rally driver, nine-time World Rally Champion

== See also ==
- Augier (name)
