= Ituzaingó, Buenos Aires =

City in Buenos Aires Province, Argentina

Ituzaingó
- City
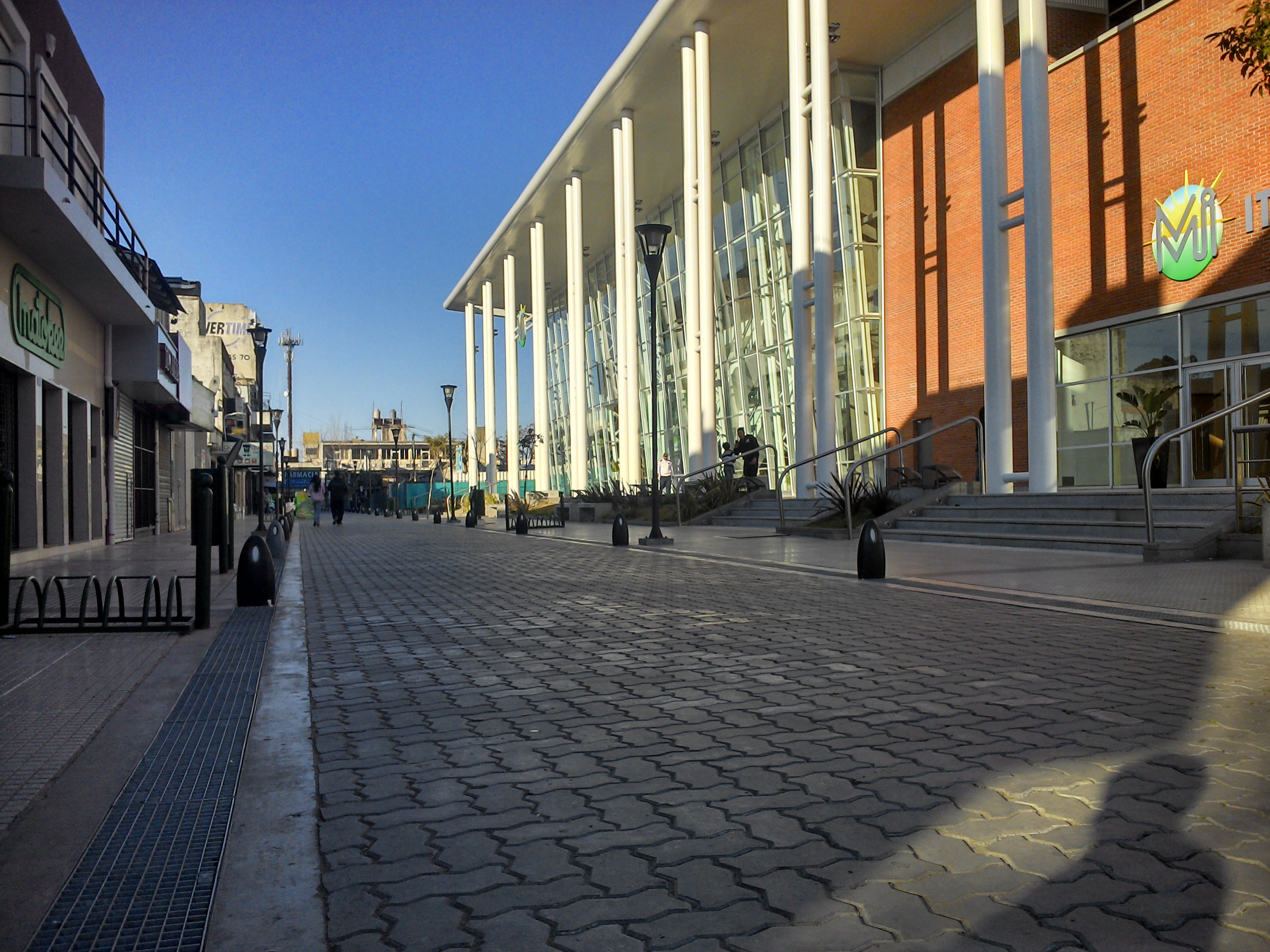
- City Hall and downtown promenade

- Location in Greater Buenos Aires Ituzaingó (Argentina)
- Coordinates: 34°40′S 58°40′W
- Country: Argentina
- Province: Buenos Aires
- Partido: Ituzaingó
- Elevation: 28 m (92 ft)

Population (2022 census)
  - Total: 180,232
- CPA Base: B 1714
- Area code: +54 11
- Website: Municipality of Ituzaingó

Ituzaingó (Spanish pronunciation: [itusajŋˈɡo]) is the capital of the Ituzaingó Partido in the Greater Buenos Aires metropolitan area, Argentina, west of Buenos Aires.

== Overview ==
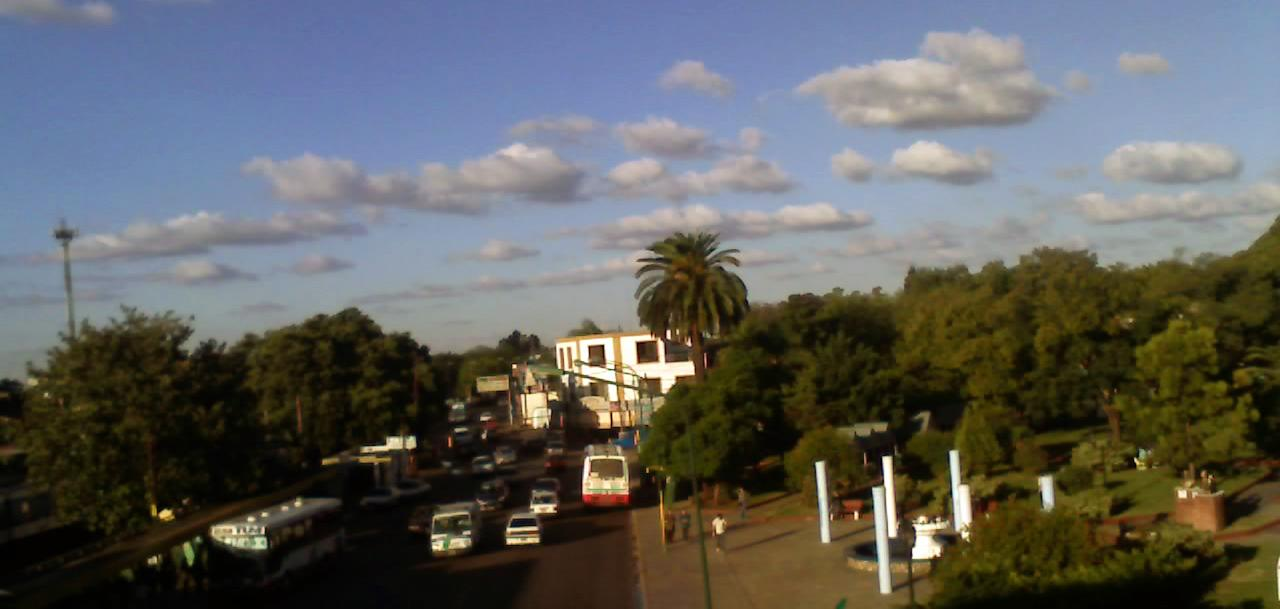
San Martín Plaza, Ituzaingó.

Ituzaingó has been the capital of the Ituzaingó Partido or municipality of Buenos Aires Province since 1995, when the partido was created. Buildings of more than three stories were until recently prohibited, and most houses are only one story high.

The city and partido (provincial district) are named in behalf of the Argentine victory in the Battle of Ituzaingó during the Cisplatine War.

The shopping area near the train station connecting the city with Buenos Aires City (Downtown) is located surrounding a square, opposite the church, where concerts, cultural events and fairs are held on weekends and holidays.

Ituzaingó is 28 km (17 mi) away from the city of Buenos Aires. It has 38.51 km^{2} (14.87 sq mi) of French-style chalets, quiet streets and leafy trees, which coexist in all neighborhoods of the city. According to the last national census of 2010, the population was 180,232 people.

It stands out as the neighborhood of Parque Leloir, one of the largest protected ecological zones of the province, and is also known to be a quiet residential neighborhood with huge houses and the home of many celebrities.

Currently, the mayor (Descalzo Jr.) is under investigation for corruption. He is accused of accessing public office and facilitating access to public positions for his entire family.

== Environmental Exploitation ==
The protected environmental areas of Parque Leloir are in danger. The local government has allowed the exploitation of enormous hectares of protected wilderness.

== Insecurity - Crimes ==
The homicide rate has averaged around 5 cases per 100,000 inhabitants, while urban robbery rates exceed 1,100 cases per 100,000 inhabitants.

== Sport ==
Club Atlético Ituzaingó is the local professional team.

== Notable people ==
- Fernando Caldeiro (1958–2009), Argentine-American NASA astronaut
- Moria Casán (born 1946), actress, producer, TV and theater personality
- Ceferino Denis (born 1978), footballer
- Manuel Lanzini (born 1991), footballer
- Tomás Lanzini (born 1988), footballer
- Ricardo Passano (1922–2012), actor
- Nicolás Peranic (born 1985), footballer
- Raúl Perrone (born 1952), filmmaker, cartoonist
- Indio Solari (1949–2026), musician and singer
