= Emilio Solanet =

Argentine veterinarian, agricultural producer and politician

Member of the Argentine Chamber of Deputies
- In office 1946–1948
- Constituency: Buenos Aires Province
- In office 1930–1930

Member of the Buenos Aires Province Chamber of Deputies
- In office 1924–1930
- Constituency: Sixth Electoral Section

President of the Deliberative Council of Ayacucho
- In office 1918–1919

President of the School Council of Ayacucho
- In office 1921–1921

Personal details
- Born: Emilio Solanet Gassiebayle; 28 April 1887 Ayacucho, Buenos Aires Province, Argentina
- Died: 7 July 1979 (aged 92) Ayacucho, Buenos Aires Province, Argentina
- Party: Radical Civic Union
- Education: University of Buenos Aires
- Occupation: Veterinarian, agricultural producer, politician

Emilio Solanet Gassiebayle (28 April 1887 – 7 July 1979) was an Argentine veterinarian, agricultural producer and politician. He was a full member of the National Academy of Agronomy and Veterinary Medicine of Argentina and a founding member of the Argentine Association of Criollo Horse Breeders.

== Biography ==
Solanet was born on 28 April 1887 in Ayacucho, Buenos Aires Province, Argentina.

In 1908, he graduated as a veterinarian from the Instituto Superior de Agronomía y Veterinaria of the University of Buenos Aires.

He owned the Criollo horses Gato and Mancha, which in 1925 began a journey from Buenos Aires to New York City, led by Swiss adventurer Aimé Tschiffely.

Solanet was active in the Radical Civic Union in Ayacucho. He served as a member of the Chamber of Deputies of Buenos Aires Province from 1924 to 1930 and was elected to the Argentine Chamber of Deputies in 1930 and again in 1946. He died on 7 July 1979, aged 92.

In 2019, a street in Ayacucho was named after him.

== Selected works ==
- Solanet, Emilio (1928). Las capas de los yeguarizos y vacunos en la República Argentina: Sinonimia. Definición y divisiones. University of Buenos Aires.
- Solanet, Emilio (1946). Tratado de hipotecnia: Principales razas caballares, su mejora y explotación. Ediciones Morata.
- Solanet, Emilio (1955). Pelajes criollos. Editorial Kraft.
