= Venezuelan Criollo horse =

Horse breed from Venezuela

Venezuelan Criollo
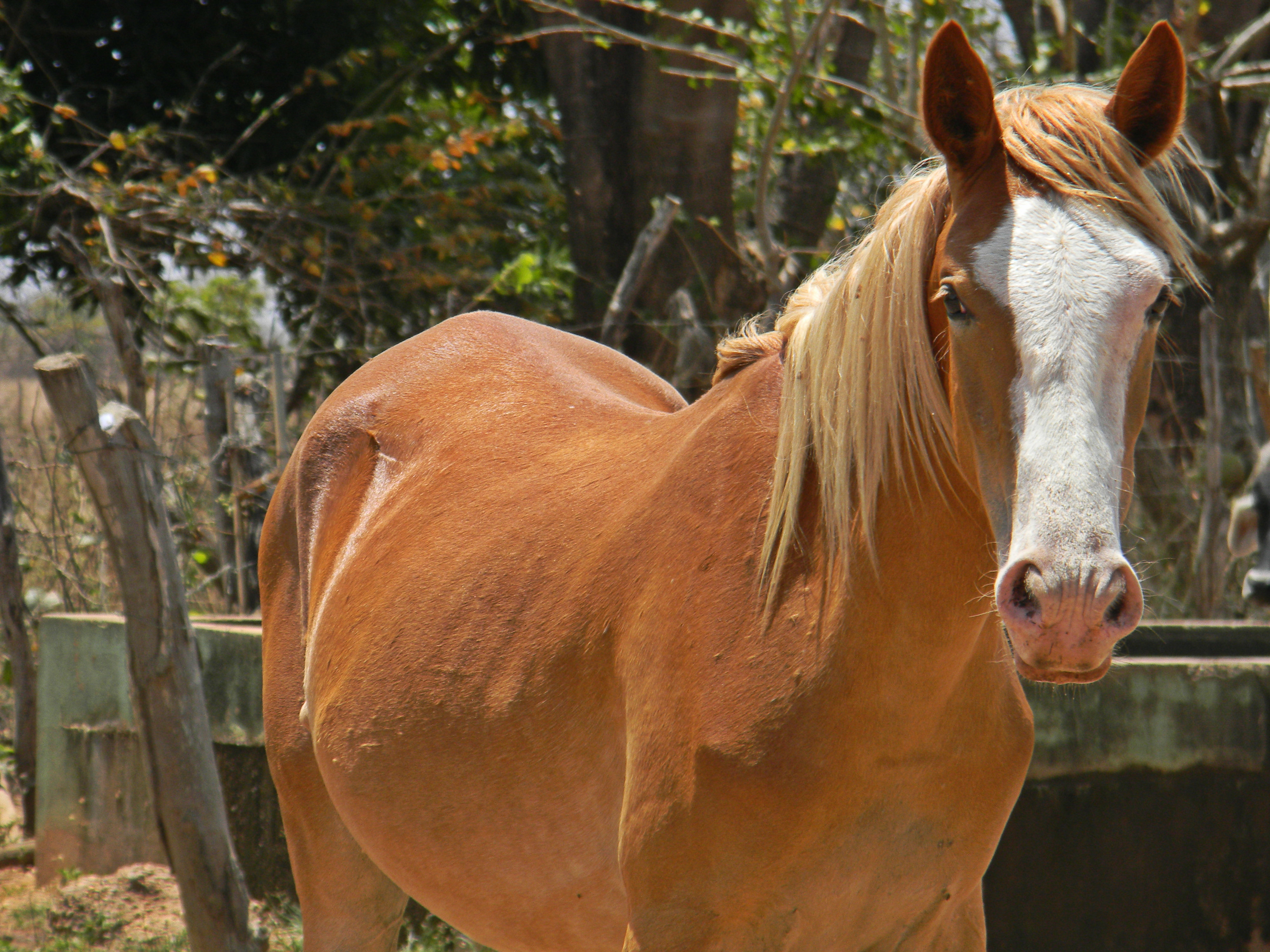
- Country of origin: Venezuela
- Use: Cattle work

Traits
- Weight: From 318 kg to 450 kg
- Height: From 1.34 m to 1.42 m
- Color: Dun gene

The Venezuelan Criollo (Spanish: Caballo Criollo Venezolano), or Caballo Llanero, is a stock horse breed native to the Llanos region of Venezuela. It descends from the Colonial Spanish horse introduced to the region from the 16th century onwards and is closely related to other South American Criollo and Paso Fino breeds. Small, hardy, and responsive, the Venezuelan Criollo is primarily used as a riding horse for cattle work in its native region and is also employed for transporting goods and people.

The breed exhibits considerable genetic diversity and is not currently considered at risk of extinction. Its main health concern is exposure to parasites, particularly Anaplasma phagocytophilum, which causes anaplasmosis. As formal breed selection is still being organized, there is no official stud book, and population numbers are unknown.

== History ==
=== Name ===
The Spanish name Llanero translates as "horse of the plains". The DAD-IS database and the University of Oklahoma Encyclopedia (2007) refer to the breed as Llanero (without diacritical mark), while CAB International, the Delachaux guide and researchers from the teams of E. G. Cothran and J. L Canelón refer to it as "Venezuelan Criollo". However, the Delachaux guide also specifies the existence of the name Llañero (with diacritical mark).

=== Formation ===
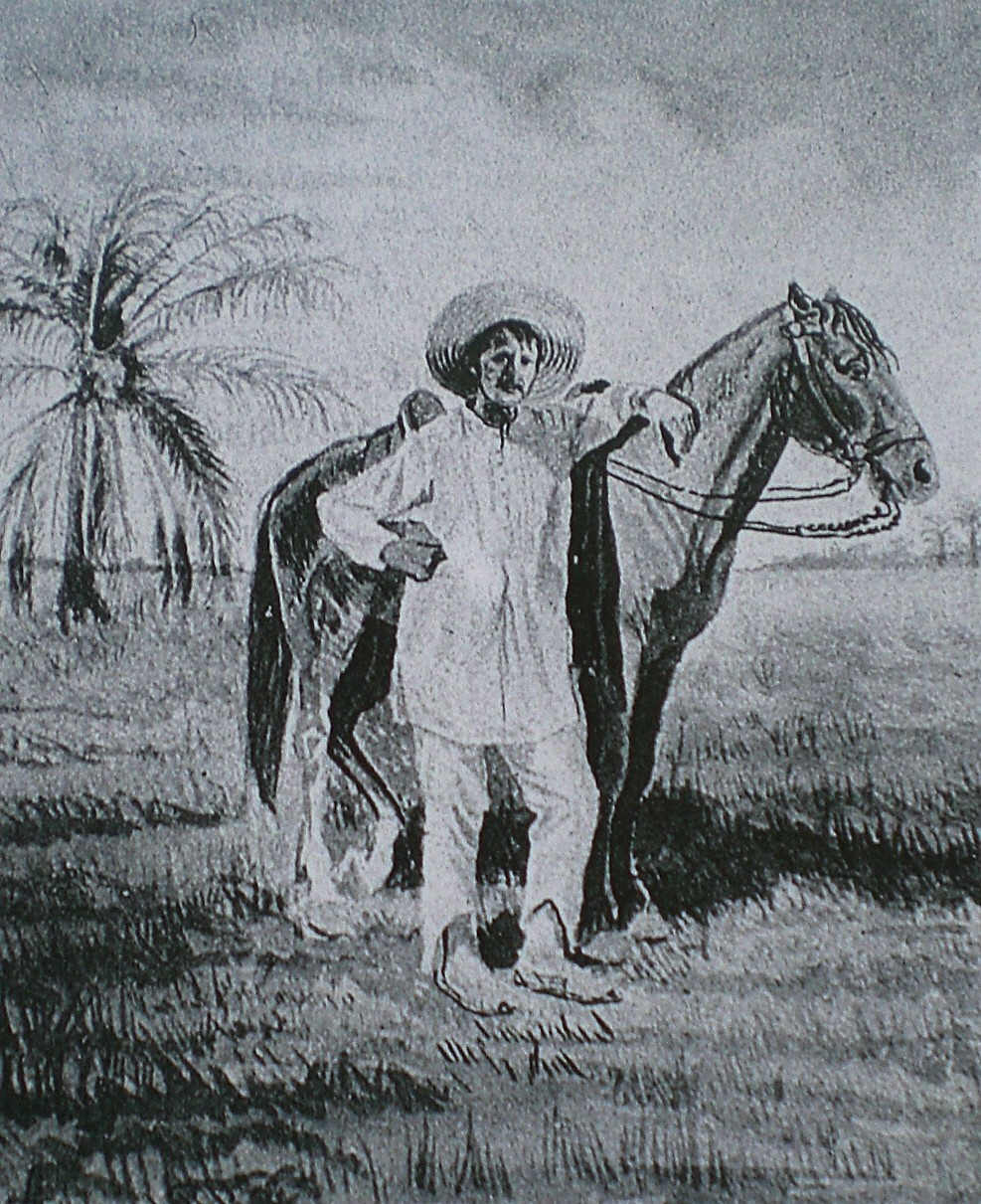
Venezuelan llanero and horse in the 19th century

Horses were extinct in South America until their reintroduction with the arrival of Spanish expeditions, beginning with the second voyage of Christopher Columbus's second voyage in 1493. The Venezuelan breed descends from Colonial Spanish horse to the region by settlers and conquistadores from the 16th century onward, sharing its origins with neighboring populations such as the Trote y galope. In 1526, the settlement of Coro introduced local horse breeding. In 1528, King Charles V of Spain commissioned the Welser governors to import horses from Hispaniola, San Juan and Santiago de Cuba to Venezuela. Horses abandoned near Buenos Aires by Don Pedro de Mendoza in 1535 are also thought to have contributed to the foundational stock. Most of these early horses originated in the Antilles, though a number are believed to have been imported directly from Spain. Ambrosius Ehinger brought over 80 horses from Sanlúcar de Barrameda to Venezuela. Similarly, in 1545, Cristóbal Rodríguez, a settler in the Llanos, brought ten mares and two foals of the Andalusian breed directly from Jerez de la Frontera.

The breed developed in the Llanos plains of north‑western Venezuela, where the harsh climate, including very dry winters, contributed to a reduction in size from the original Iberian stock.

=== Since the 20th century ===
The Venezuelan Criollo was first described and characterized in published works by Ángel Cabrera in Buenos Aires in 1945, followed by R. De Armas in a 1946 veterinary thesis, which remains one of the most complete early descriptions of the breed. The formal organisation of Venezuelan Criollo breeding is more recent, motivated by local llaneros’ observations that traditional horses were better suited to the regional climate than imported American Quarter Horse. Researchers from the Universidad Centroccidental Lisandro Alvarado in Barquisimeto have conducted studies on the breed. By 2011, when a genetic characterisation study was published on 214 individuals compared with other South American horse breeds, there was still no formal stud book or herd book for the Venezuelan Criollo.

== Description ==
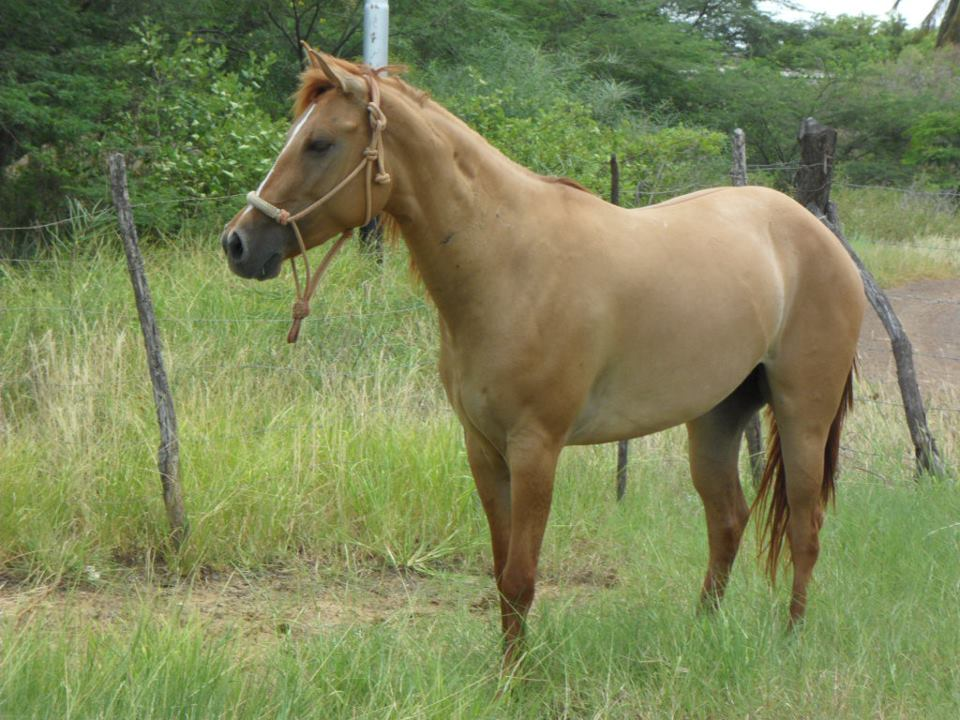
Venezuelan Criollo with chestnut dun coat in the state of Apure

Although the DAD‑IS database classifies it as a pony, the Venezuelan Criollo is a small horse typical of South American Criollos. Sources such as Hendricks (University of Oklahoma, 2007) and the Delachaux guide (2014) report an average height of 1.42 m. The breed is similar to the Argentine Criollo, but lighter in pattern, the result of the influence of the climate in its native region. The Venezuelan Criollo is also close to the Colombian Criollo. There are few phenotypic differences between horses from the states of Apure, Aragua and Mérida.

The head is rectilinear, sometimes slightly convex, and generally triangular in shape, with a broad base. Cheeks are prominent, eyes triangular and expressive. Medium-sized ears point upwards. The neck is of medium length, rather thick, with little definition at the throat. The chest is relatively narrow. The back is generally straight and strong, the rump rather swollen and short. The limbs are slender, ending in small, sturdy paws. Mane, tuft and tail are thick and abundant, but dewlap is rare.

=== Coat ===
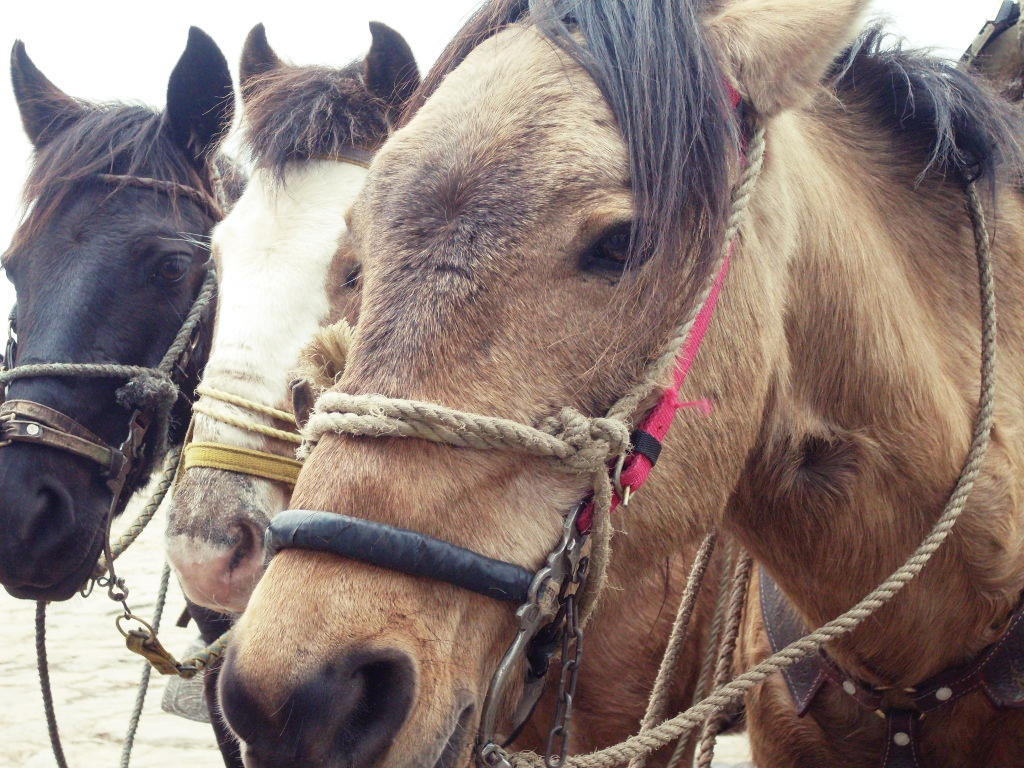
Venezuelan Criollo horses of various colors in Mucubají, Mérida state

The coat is generally characterized by the expression of the Dun gene (which includes the bay dun and grullo coats), with black manes and markings, but a wide variety of other coats are possible, including chestnut, bay in all shades, black, gray, roan, strawberry roan, palomino and piebald.

=== Temperament, care and selection ===
The Venezuelan Criollo is noted for its hardiness and low feed requirements. It is well adapted to the climatic conditions of the Llanos and is generally calm yet responsive when ridden. Selection for livestock work has contributed to the breed’s endurance. Hematological disorders and parasitic infestations are considered major challenges for horse breeding in the region. A parasitological study carried out on two Venezuelan ranches shows that infestations with Trypanosoma evansi (7.3%), Babesia equi (1.4%) and Anaplasma phagocytophilum (32.9%) are possible, and are responsible for significant losses in farm horses.

=== Genetics ===
The Venezuelan Criollo exhibits substantial genetic diversity. Like all South American Criollo breeds, it belongs to a gene cluster known as "h", which is also found in Iberian horses and the Sorraia. A study of 214 Venezuelan Criollo horses identified several rare alleles, though these occurred at low frequencies. Genetically, the breed is closely related to the Chilote and Colombian Paso Fino, as well as the Puerto Rican Paso Fino, reflecting its Caribbean origins.

The breed has also been studied for the presence of the DMRT3 gene mutation associated with gaited horses. In a sample of 21 individuals, the mutation was absent in 16.7% of the horses, confirming that some Venezuelan Criollo horses are capable of additional gaits.

== Usage ==
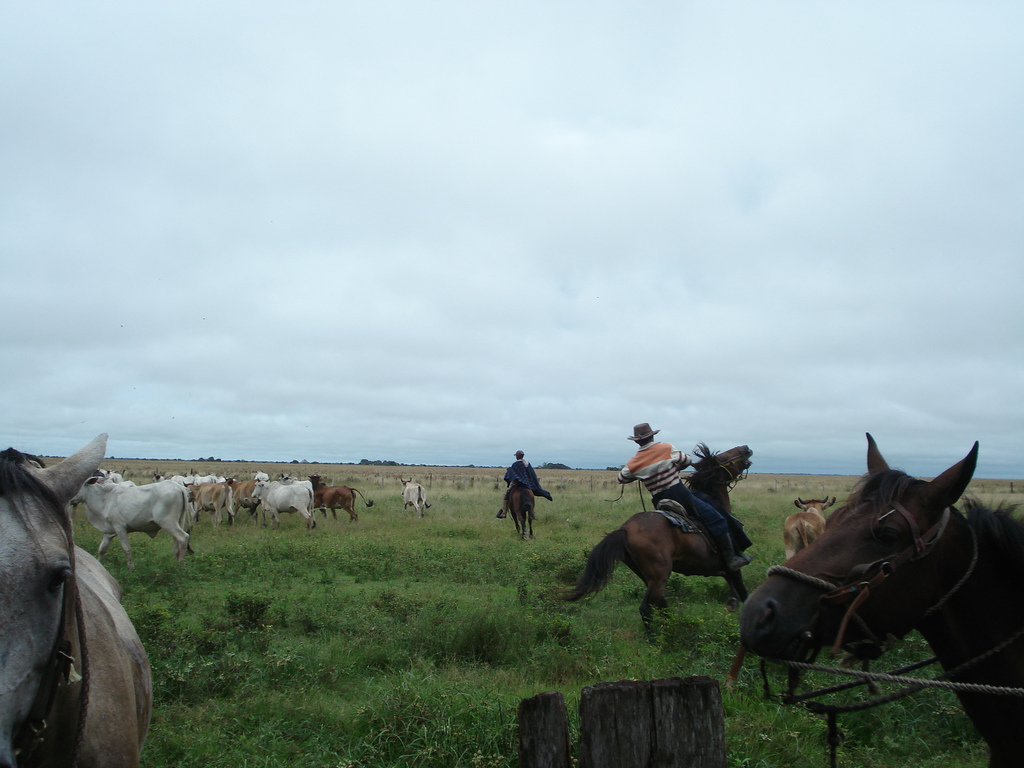
Venezuelan Criollos mounted for cattle work.

The Venezuelan Criollo is an essential partner for farm and ranch work. There is a difference in use according to sex: the horses put to work are very generally the males, while the females are put to breeding. These horses are mainly used as mounts for transporting people and goods in rural Venezuela. In particular, they are used for work riding with livestock. This use is predominant on Venezuela's large cattle farms. These horses help the Llaneros to stimulate, fetch and capture cattle destined for meat production in the country.

The breed is also regarded as suitable for trail riding and other riding activities. Cross‑breeding with other horse breeds is uncommon, as hybrids are generally regarded as less well adapted to the climatic and environmental conditions of the Venezuelan Llanos.

== Breeding spread ==
The Venezuelan Criollo is unique to Venezuela and is traditionally divided into three sub‑populations in the states of Apure, Aragua and Mérida. It is classified by some authorities as a local breed, but there are no comprehensive population records.

Although some sources suggest that cross‑breeding has increased, genetic studies indicate that the breed’s high genetic diversity and substantial numbers make the risk of extinction low in the absence of a severe genetic bottleneck

== Bibliography ==
- Hendricks, Bonnie Lou (2007). International Encyclopedia of Horse Breeds (2nd ed.). University of Oklahoma Press. ISBN 978-0-8061-3884-8.
- Porter, Valerie; Alderson, Lawrence; Hall, Stephen; Sponenberg, Dan (2016). Mason's World Encyclopedia of Livestock Breeds and Breeding. CAB International. ISBN 978-1-84593-466-8.
- Rousseau, Élise (2014). Tous les chevaux du monde (in French). Delachaux et Niestlé. ISBN 978-2-603-01865-1.
- De Armas, R. (1946). Caballo Criollo. Doctoral thesis, Facultad de Ciencias Veterinarias (in Spanish). Universidad Central de Venezuela.
- Aparicio, G. Exterior de los grandes animales domésticos (in Spanish). Imprenta Moderna.
- Cabrera, A. (1945). Caballos de América (in Spanish). Editorial Suramericana.
- Canelón, J. L.; Páez, J.; Rojas, C. (2002). Morfometría del caballo Criollo en el Llano Apureño, zona alta del Edo. Lara y Parque Nacional Sierra Nevada (in Spanish). Barquisimeto: II Jornada Nacional para el Estudio y la Conservación del Caballo Criollo Venezolano "Dr. José A. Giacopini Zárraga".
- Canelón, J. (2005). Caracteristicas fenotipicas del caballo criollo. Observaciones en el Estado Apure (PDF) (in Spanish). Archivos de Zootecnia.
- Canelón, J.; Ortiz, A.; Vasquez, R.; Mosquera, O. (2011). "Evaluación de los Aplomos en caballos criollos venezolanos de un hato del Estado Apure". Actas Iberoamericanas de Conservación Animal (in Spanish). 1 (1): 401–404.
- Castellanos, Raymi; Canelón, José; Calzolaio, Vita; Aguinaco, Federico; López, Ángel; Montesinos, Roselys (2010). Estudio hematológico y detección de hemoparásitos en caballos criollos venezolanos de dos hatos del Estado Apure, Venezuela (in Spanish). Revista Científica.
- Cothran, E.G.; Canelon, J.L.; Luis, C.; Conant, E. (2011). Genetic analysis of the Venezuelan Criollo horse (PDF). Genetics and Molecular Research. Archived from the original (PDF) on 14 November 2023.
