= Guilhem Figueira =

Languedocian jongleur and troubadour

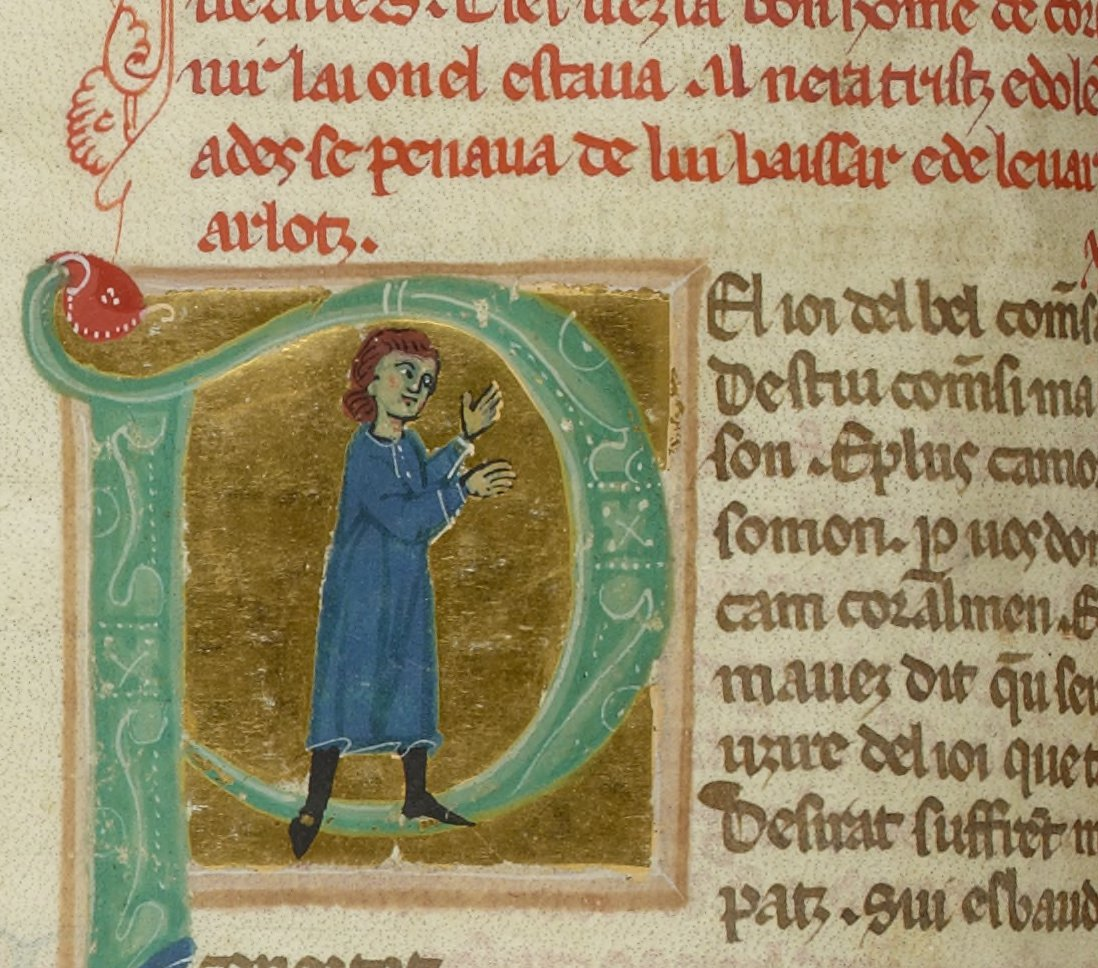
Guilhem Figueira

Guillem or Guilhem Figueira or Figera was a Languedocian jongleur and troubadour from Toulouse active at the court of the Emperor Frederick II in the 1230s. He was a close associate of both Aimery de Pégulhan and Guillem Augier Novella.

The son of a tailor and a tailor by trade, as a result of the Albigensian Crusade, he was exiled from his homeland and took refuge in Lombardy, where he eventually made his way to Frederick's court. In Italy he and Aimery, a fellow exile, helped to found a troubadour tradition of lamentation for the "good old days" of pre-Crusade Languedoc. The exiles' native Lombard successors continued to employ the Occitan language, however, and it was not until the time of Dante Alighieri that Italian got a significant vernacular literature of its own.

In 1228, Guilhem denied the efficacy of the crusade indulgence and blamed the death of "good" King Louis VIII, who died of dysentery at the siege of Avignon, on the false indulgence which had drawn him out of the safety of Paris. His most famous work, the sirventes contra Roma ("sirventes against Rome", actually entitled D'un sirventes far), was a strong reprimand for the papacy, its violent character probably engendered by the circumstances of its composition: Guilhem wrote it while he was in Toulouse besieged by the Crusaders in 1229. It was set to a famous hymn about the Virgin Mary and was therefore memorisable to the masses.

Guilhem attacked the papacy not only for the Albigensian Crusade and the cruel sack of Béziers, but also for the failures of the Fourth and Fifth Crusades, papal imperialism, and the moral failings of the clergy. He alleged that avarice was the motive of the Crusades, which in his mind were directed only at the Greeks, fellow Christians. The singing of Figueira's sirventes was outlawed by the Inquisition in Toulouse, though the 1274 inquisition which condemned a burgher of Toulouse on the basis of knowing the Roma tricharitz does not refer to the third stanza of Guilhem's sirventes, but to a vernacular work called La Bible. On the basis of his language, such as the use of matrem fornicationem (mother of fornication) to describe Rome, even modern scholars have labelled him a heretic.

Guilhem fled to Italy in 1229 or 1230. In Italy, Guilhem was free to criticise the Papacy and the Crusade however much and in whatever way he pleased. He attacked the Pope for his Crusade against Frederick, his new protector, and encouraged peace in Christendom in order to help the Crusades abroad in the Holy Land. In an earlier work, Totz hom qui ben comensa e ben fenis, dated to 1215–1220, he had encouraged Frederick's decision to take up the Cross in the Holy Land.

Among Guilhem's other surviving works are the sirventes Nom laissarai per paor (post-1216), which criticises the Church's false preaching, and Del preveire maior, which urges the pope and emperor to make peace and send a force to save the Holy Land from the Khwarezmians who had taken Jerusalem (1244).

== Excerpt from the sirventes contra Roma ==
Roma trichairitz,
C'a vostras berbitz
Lo sains Esperitz

cobeitat vos engana
tondetz trop la lana;
que receup carn humana

Entenda mos precs
E franha tos becs,
Roma! No m'entrecs,
Car es falsa e trafana
Vas nos e vas Grecs!

. . .

Roma, als Sarrazis
Mas Grecs e Latis
Inz el foc d'abis,

faitz vos pauc de dampnatge
metetz e carnalatge;
Roma, faitz vostre estatge,

En perdicion.

Treacherous Rome,
So that you shear
May the Holy Ghost

avarice ensnares you
too much wool from your sheep;
who takes on human flesh

Hear my prayers
And break your beaks,
O Rome! You will never have truce with me,
Because you are false and perfidious
With us and with the Greeks!

. . .

Rome, to the Saracens
But to the Greeks and Latins
In the bottom of the abyss,

you do little damage
massacre and carnage;
Rome, you have your seat

In hell.

== Bibliography ==
- Graham-Leigh, Elaine. The Southern French Nobility and the Albigensian Crusade. Woodbridge: The Boydell Press, 2005. ISBN 1-84383-129-5.
- Siberry, Elizabeth. Criticism of Crusading, 1095–1274. Oxford: Clarendon Press, 1985. ISBN 0-19-821953-9.
- Throop, Palmer A. "Criticism of Papal Crusade Policy in Old French and Provençal." Speculum, Vol. 13, No. 4. (Oct., 1938), pp 379–412.
