= Ceferino Denis =

Argentine footballer

Personal information
- Full name: Ceferino Hugo Raúl Denis
- Date of birth: 9 November 1978 (age 47)
- Place of birth: Ituzaingó, Argentina
- Height: 1.78 m (5 ft 10 in)
- Position: Defender

Senior career*
Years	Team	Apps	(Gls)
1998–2002	Argentinos Juniors	49	(1)
2002–2003	Nacional Tijuana	33	(3)
2003	Gimnasia y Tiro	9	(0)
2004–2010	Deportivo Morón	138	(16)
2009	→ Defensores de Belgrano (loan)	25	(1)
2010	Unión San Felipe	16	(1)
- * Club domestic league appearances and goals

Ceferino Hugo Raúl Denis (born 9 November 1978) is an Argentine former footballer who played as a defender. His last club was Unión San Felipe.

== Teams ==
- (Argentina) Argentinos Juniors 1998–2002
- (Mexico) Nacional Tijuana 2002–2003
- (Argentina) Gimnasia y Tiro 2003
- (Argentina) Deportivo Morón 2004–2008
- (Argentina) Defensores de Belgrano 2009
- (Argentina) Deportivo Morón 2009–2010
- (Chile) Unión San Felipe 2010
