= Serge Augier =

French writer

Serge Augier (born in 1969) is heir to the Taoist Tradition "Ba Men Da Xuan", author of books and articles on Taoism in French and English, and the primary subject of the book "Warrior Guards the Mountain: The Internal Martial Traditions of China, Japan and South East Asia". He is known for his teaching of Traditional Chinese Medicine and martial arts, particularly the Chinese Internal styles (Neijia), including Ziranmen, tai chi, Xingyiquan, Baguazhang and Taoist qigong. He has been an invited speaker at InreesTv where he was interviewed by the famous French writer and former war-correspondent Stéphane Allix on the origin and practice of Taoism.

Serge Augier was the subject of two documentaries on the clan Taoist arts, from the Warrior Guards the Mountain series by Line of Intent. In 2017 he gave an in-depth interview for Falcon Books. In 2019, Serge Augier was interviewed on the national CBC radio program, ICI Radio-Canada.

== Published books ==
=== In French ===
- Encyclopédie Pratique du Tao (Practical Encyclopedia of the Tao)
- Thérapie spirituelle
- Herboristerie
- Le grand secret apologie d'une spiritualité globale
- Yi Jing. Mieux se connaître. Prendre les bonnes décisions
- Vivre en harmonie avec les saisons
- Le Secret des immortels
- Traite de Magie Taoïiste

=== In English ===
- Ba Zi - The Four Pillars of Destiny: Understanding Character, Relationships and Potential Through Chinese Astrology
- Shen Gong and Nei Dan in Da Xuan: A Manual for Working with Mind, Emotion, and Internal Energy
- Urban Violence: Mian Xiang for Self Defence
- Daoist Boxing: The Authentic Transmission of Internal Martial Arts
- Eight Principles for Happiness
- Dao De Jing For Actual Transformation
- Seasonal Nei Gong
