= Augièr Galhard =

Occitan writer, 16th century

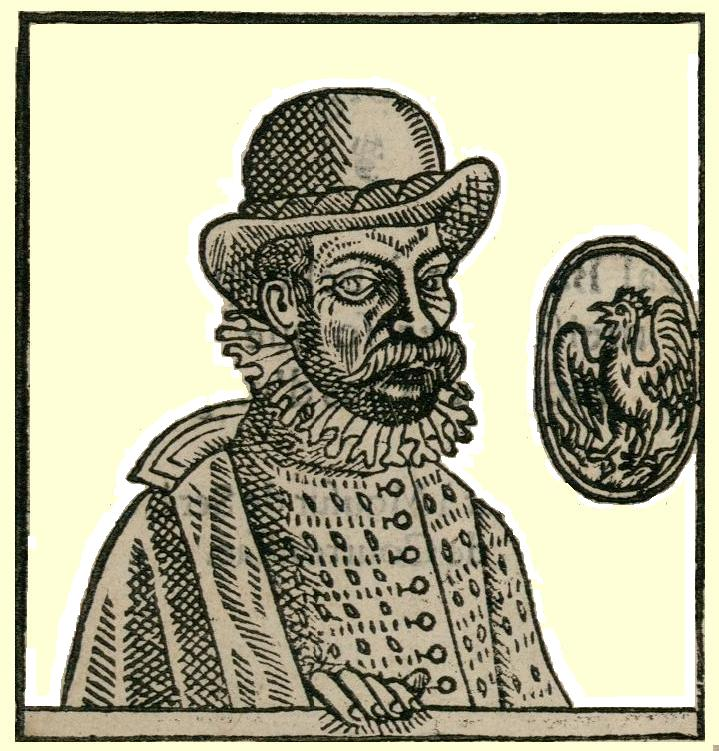

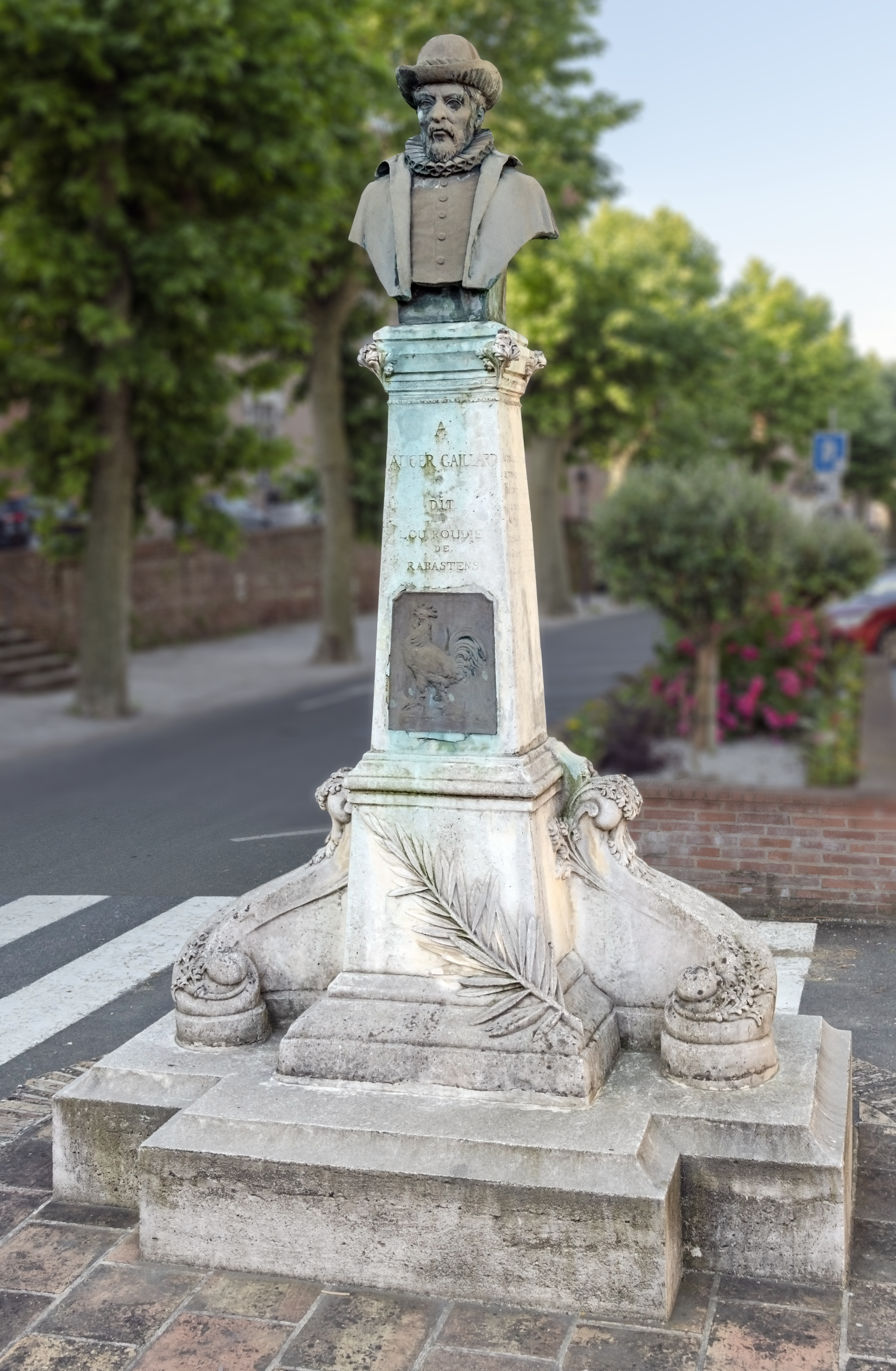
Monument to Auger Galhard in Rabastens

Augièr Galhard was a 16th-century Occitan language writer from western Languedoc.

== Biography ==
He was first a wheelwright (for this reason he is also known under the name of Lo Rodièr de rabastens, "rodièr" meaning wheelwright in Occitan language) born in Rabastens in 1540. He then served as a huguenot soldier during the War of Religion under the command of Guillaume de Lherm.

Augièr Galhard was also a rebec player and (both as a poet and as a musician) became an entertainer and thus earn his life both as a soldier and as an artist. As his work drew him to northern France, he also wrote poetry in French.

Galhard finally settle in Bearn, political center of Kingdom of Navarre Calvinist court, where the regent Catherine de Bourbon granted him a private income.

== Literary work ==
Occitan critics such as Jean-Baptiste Noulet and Robert Lafont mention three Occitan language books written by Augièr Galhard :

- Las Obras (Las Obros in the original graphy) printed in 1579, at first censored.
- Lo libre gràs (Lou libre gras) printed 1581 censored for being obscene, with no known remaining edition.
- Lo banquet (Lou banquet)

== Bibliography ==
- Gustave de Caussade, Poésies languedociennes et françaises d'Augier Gaillard, Éd. S. Rodière, Albi, 1843
