= Criollo horse =

Breed of horse

Criollo
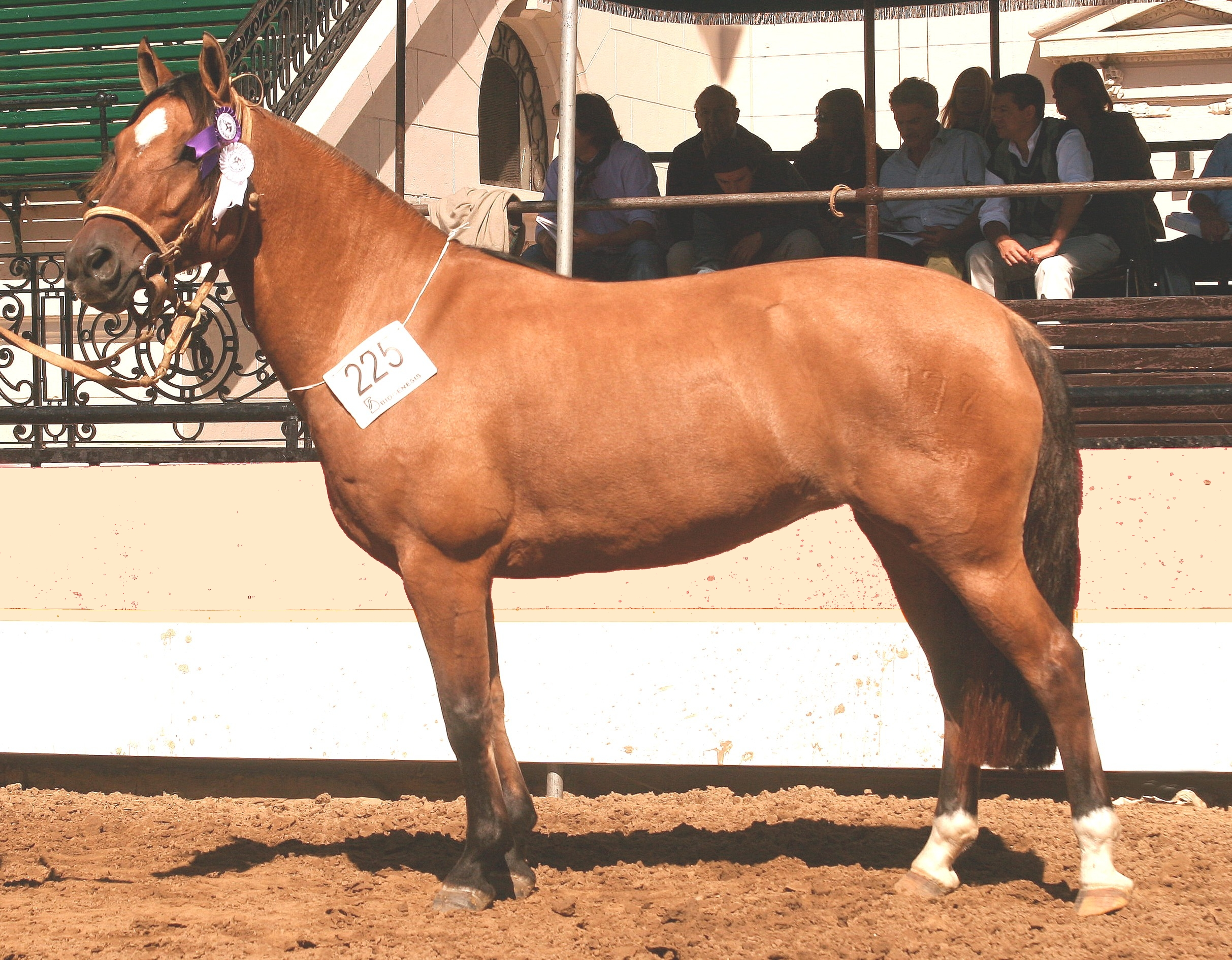
- Argentine Criollo mare

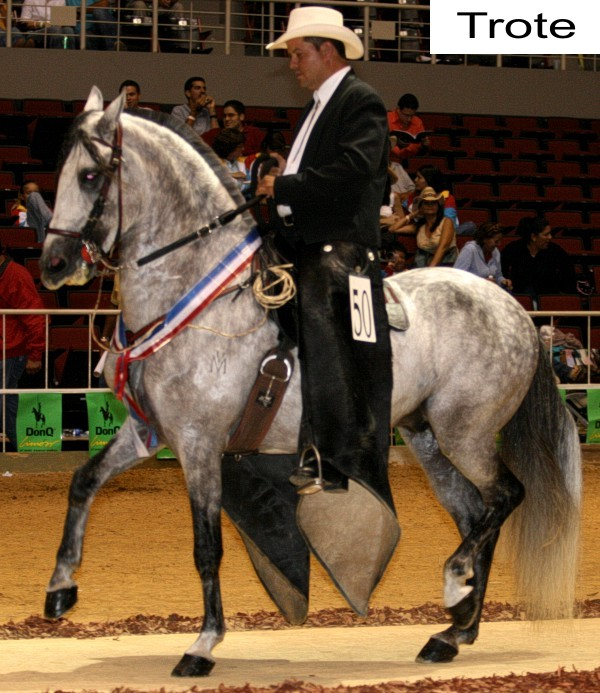
- Colombian Criollo horse
- Conservation status: DOM
- Other names: Criollo (Argentina), Crioulo (Brazil), Costeño/Morochuco (Peru), Corralero (Chile), Llanero (Venezuela)
- Country of origin: Pampas (Argentina, Uruguay and Brazil)

Traits
- Distinguishing features: Compact and strong, straight or convex head, broad chest, well-developed joints, small in stature.

The Criollo (in Spanish), or Crioulo (in Portuguese), is the native horse of the Pampas (a natural region between Argentina, Brazil, and Uruguay, in South America), with a reputation for long-distance endurance linked to a low basal metabolism. The breed, known for its hardiness and stamina, is popular in its home countries.

The word criollo or crioulo originally referred to human and animals of pure-bred Spanish ancestry who were born in the Americas, or to animals or slaves born in the Americas. In time, the meaning of the word would simply come to refer to native breeds of the Americas.

== Breed characteristics ==
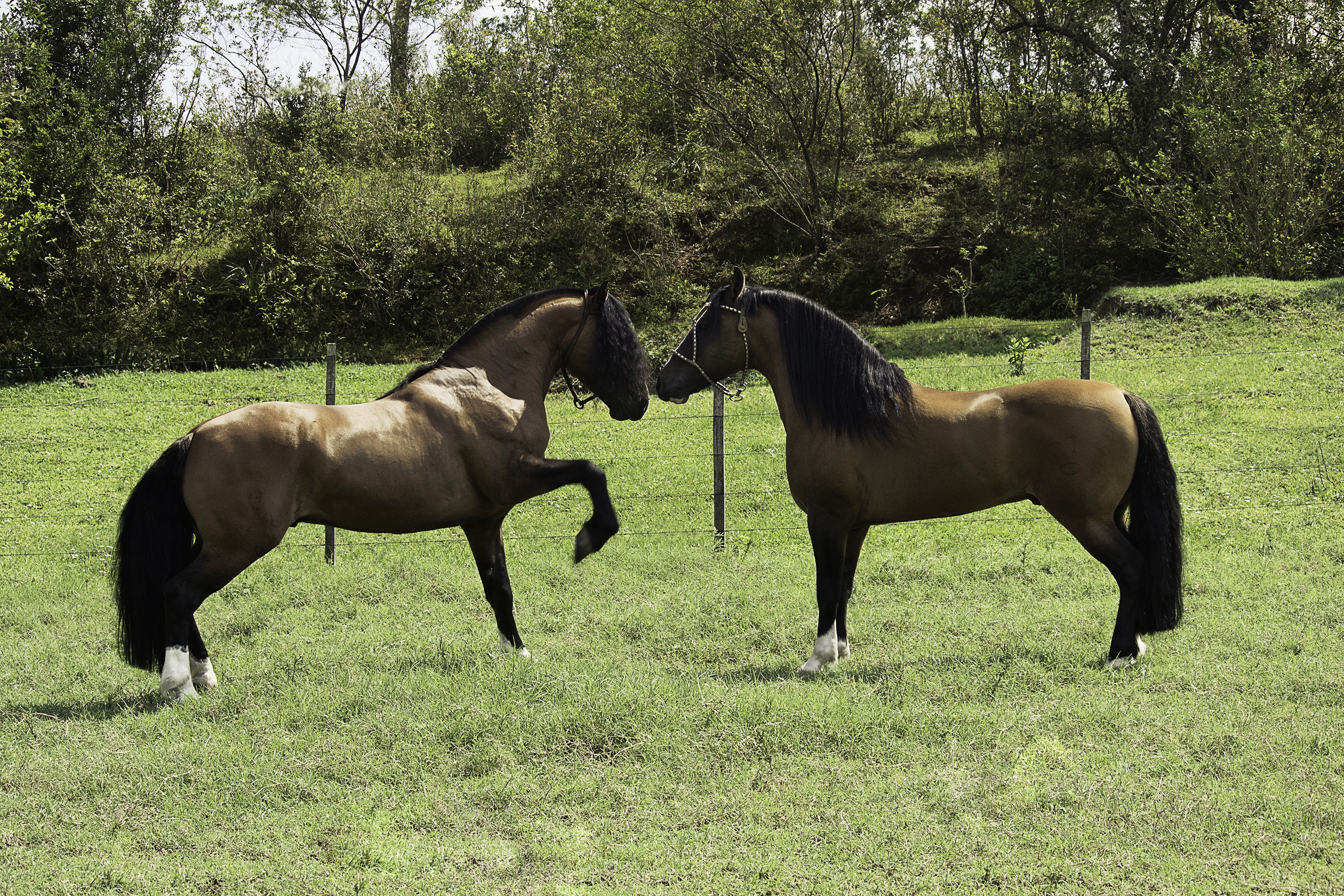
Two Criollo stallions in Brazil

The Criollo is a hardy horse with a brawny and strong body with broad chest and well-sprung ribs. They have sloping strong shoulders with muscular necks, short and strong legs with good bone structure and resistant joints, low-set hocks, and sound hard feet. The medium-sized to large long-muzzled head has a straight or slightly convex profile with wide-set eyes. The croup is sloping, the haunches well-muscled, and the back short with a strong loin.

The criollo is tractable, intelligent, willing, and sensible. Criollo horses average 14.3 hands (149 cm) high, being the maximum height for stallions and geldings of 14 to 15 hands (142-152 cm) high. The difference between the maximum and minimum height for mares is approximately 2 cm (one inch). The line-backed dun is the most popular color, but the breed may also come in bay, brown, black, chestnut, grullo, buckskin, palomino, blue or strawberry roan, gray and overo colors.

The breed is famous for its endurance capabilities and ability to live in harsh conditions, as their homeland has both extreme heat and cold weather. They are frugal eaters, thriving on little grass. They have good disease resistance and are long-lived horses.

== Breed history ==
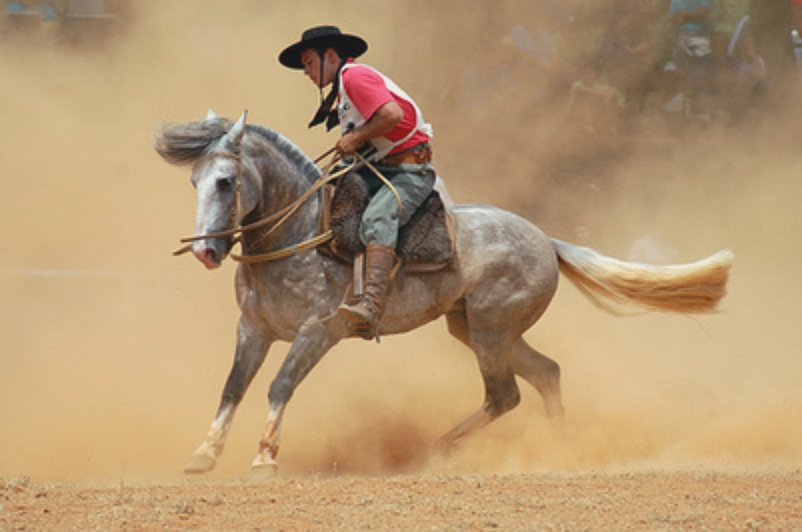
A gaucho with Criollo horse

The breed dates back to a 1535 shipment of 100 purebred Spaniards – Andalusian stallions coming from Cádiz, Spain, to the Rio de la Plata imported by the founder of Buenos Aires, Pedro de Mendoza.

In 1540, the hostility of the native populace forced the Spaniards to abandon Buenos Aires and release 12 to 45 horses. When Buenos Aires was resettled in 1580, it is estimated that the feral horse population numbered around 12,000. Since they largely reproduced in the wild, the criollo developed into an extremely hardy horse capable of surviving the extreme heat and cold, subsisting with little water, and living off the dry grasses of the area. Settlers later came and started capturing horses for riding and use as pack animals. The Native Americans had already been doing that for many years.

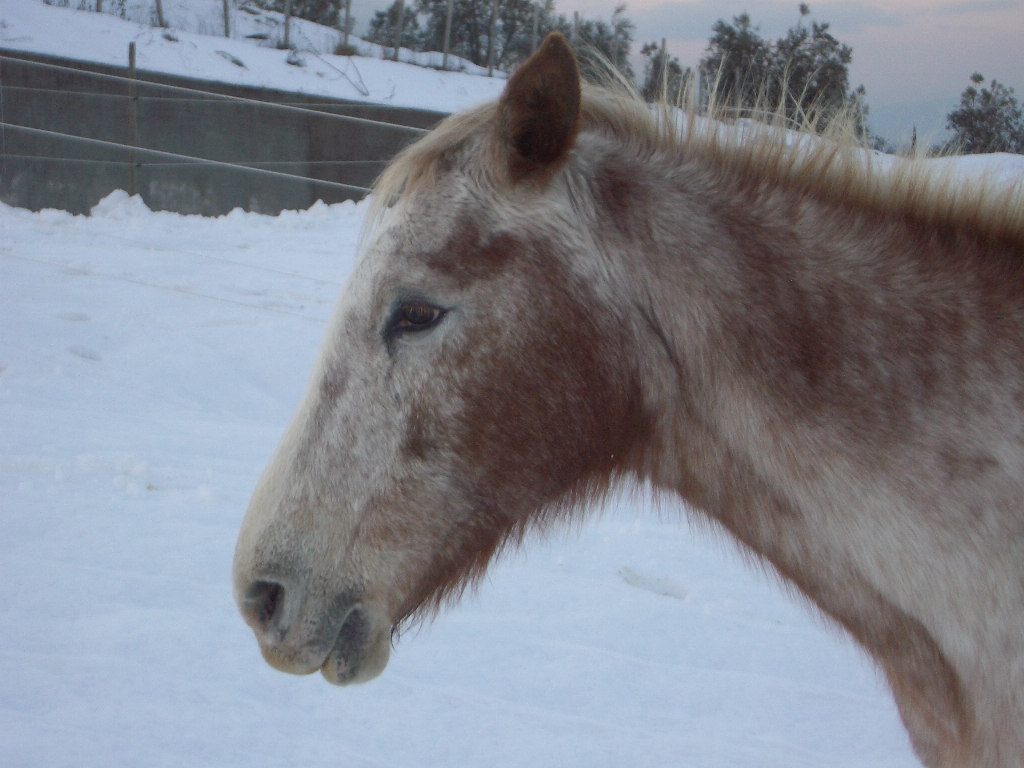
Criollo horse with winter coat (strawberry roan color)

Throughout the 19th century, a large proportion of the horses were crossed with imported European Thoroughbred, coach, and draft horse stallions, and a larger, coarser, long-striding multi-purpose, saddle-cart horse resulted. However, the crossbreeding nearly ruined the native Spanish horse type. In 1918, the Argentine breeders decided to create a purebred criollo registry, and the breeders' association was then formed in 1923. Much infighting occurred between Emilio Solanet and Enrique Crotto's groups. The first promoted the Asian-type crioulo and the latter the taller African type with a coarse, convex head; fallen croup; and thinner mane and tail.

It was not until 1934 that Dr. Solanet was able to firmly take control of the breeders association. He set a new goal for the breed with a shorter, more compact stock horse which emulated the Chilean Horse breed that he admired so much. In 1938, 70% of the registered crioulos were culled because they did not possess the phenotype desired by Dr. Solanet and his followers. The new breed standard, about which he had written in 1928, was finally made available to the public once he was assured that the breeders were more united in their breed objectives. It would not be until 1957 that the registry was closed for Argentine native breeds, but the registry has remained open for the Chilean Horse breed that has been so influential in giving shape to the crioulo as a better stock horse. Nevertheless, the breed maintains its own identity in a taller, leggier and squarer body conformation with a more angular hock that gives it the long stride it requires to cover the great distances in the flat Argentine plains known as "Pampas". The modern crioulo head has a straight facial profile and a shorter muzzle with longer ears than is typical in the Chilean Horse breed.

== Endurance ==
The breeders implemented rigorous endurance tests to help evaluate horses for breeding. In these events known as La Marcha, the horses are ridden over a 750 km (466 mi) course to be completed in 75 hours split into 14 days. No supplemental feed is allowed. The horses are required to carry heavy loads of 245 lb (110 kg) on their backs and may only eat the grass at the side of the road. At the end of the day, a veterinarian checks the horses.

Today, the horse is used mainly as a working cow horse, but it is also considered a pleasure and trail horse which contributed a great deal to the Argentine polo pony (Note: Criollo-Thoroughbred crosses possibly make excellent polo ponies.) They are also excellent rodeo and endurance horses. The national rodeo competition is known as paleteada, and it involves a paired team of horses and riders that approach a steer from both sides at a full run. The steer is sandwiched in between the two horses that lean onto the bovine, practically carrying it down a 60 m (200 ft) long delineated path beyond which the horses must not go during the defined trajectory. The task demonstrates a level of control enabling the riders to pick up a steer and place it where they want.

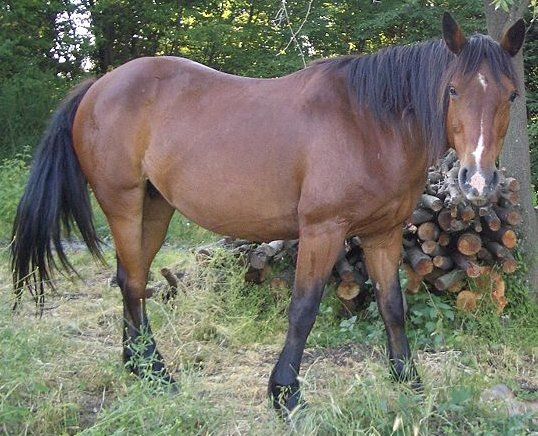
Criollo horse at a rescue center in Tuscany, Italy

One example of the breed's endurance was the ride made by the Swiss-born Argentine rider Aimé Félix Tschiffely (1894–1954) between 1925 and 1928. Tschiffely took two crioulos, 16-year-old Mancha and 15-year-old Gato, on a 21,500-kilometre (13,400 mi) trek from Buenos Aires to Manhattan, New York, crossing snow-capped mountains, the world's driest desert, the thickest tropical jungles, riding in all types of weather. Alternating the riding and packing between the two horses, the trio took three years to finish the trip. Tschiffely went through many hardships on the trip, including a bout of malaria, from the Pampas across La Quiaca, from La Paz, to Cusco, Lima, Trujillo, Quito, Medellín and Cartagena. They rode up to 5,900 metres (19,400 ft) above sea level, through Passo El Cóndor, between Potosi and Chaliapata,(Bolivia). The horses did well in a wide array of extreme topographies and climates. Gato lived to be 36 and Mancha 40. They lived the last years of their lives as celebrities in La estancia El Cardal (El Cardal Ranch), the breeding establishment of the man most credited for developing the crioulo breed, Emilio Solanet.

In 1987, Jorge Saenz Rosas, owner of the Argentine Estancia Cristiano Muerto, offered his criollo Sufridor to the American Louis Bruhnke and the Russian-French Vladimir Fissenko for a horseback ride from the Beagle Channel in Tierra del Fuego up to the shores of the Arctic Ocean in Deadhorse, Alaska. After traveling for five and a half years, the ride was accomplished in the summer of 1993. Having made the entire journey, the Criollo Sufridor is likely the horse that has traveled the farthest in a single direction. The ride was chronicled in the book Sufridor, Emece (2000) (ISBN 9789500421355), written by Bruhnke.

== See also ==
- Argentine polo (horse breed)
- Gaucho
- Gaucho sheepdog
- Venezuelan Criollo horse
