= Aimé Félix Tschiffely =

Swiss-Argentine professor, author, and adventurer (1895–1954)

Portrait of A.F. Tschiffely

Aimé Félix Tschiffely (May 7, 1895 – January 5, 1954) was a Swiss-born, Argentine professor, author, and adventurer. A. F. Tschiffely (as he was better known) wrote a number of books, most famously Tschiffely's Ride (1933) and A Tale of Two Horses (1935) in which he recounts his solo journey on horseback from Argentina to Washington D.C. Tschiffely was a household name in the United States during the 1930s, meeting with President Calvin Coolidge, appearing in National Geographic Magazine and earning a living from his popular book sales.

== Life ==
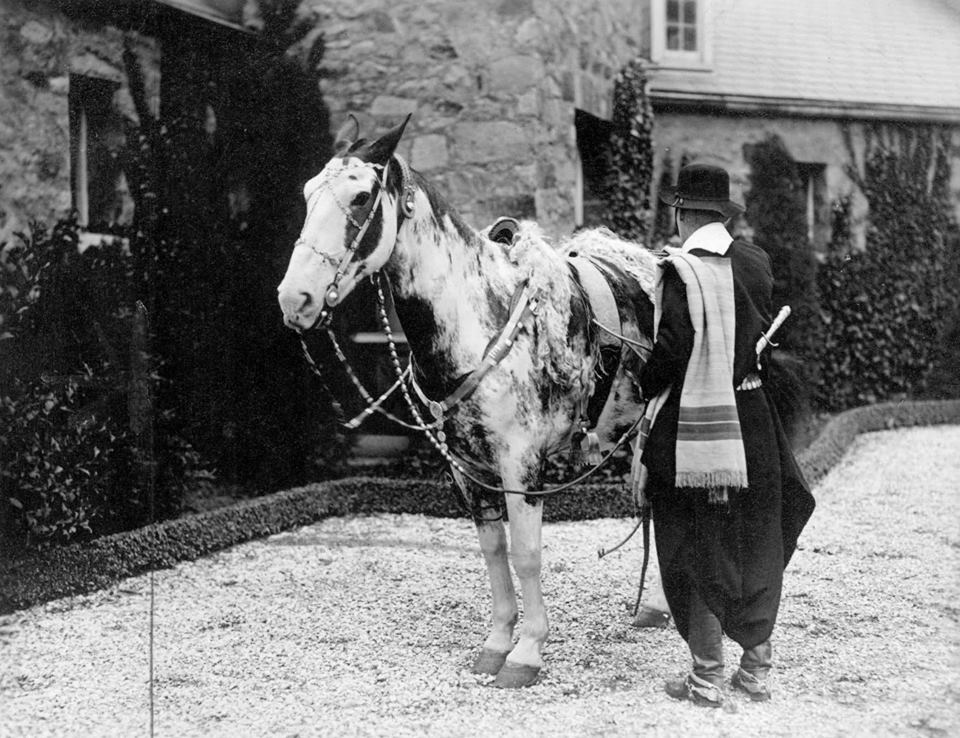
Aimé Félix Tschiffely with "Mancha", one of the two horses that he rode during the Buenos Aires-New York voyage that took 3 years, from 1925 to 1928.

A. F. Tschiffely was born into an old Swiss family in Bern in 1895 where he was educated and became a teacher. An adventurer at heart, he left Switzerland to teach in England in his early 20s, but found a new passion as a professional footballer and boxer. He then moved to Buenos Aires where he settled into teaching again, at St. George's College, Quilmes, and later as the temporary headmaster of the Buenos Aires English High School, but still found time on long vacations for adventures riding horses and exploring the surrounding pampas.

He made many friends among the ranchers and learned a lot about horses and outdoor travel. In April 1925, at the age of thirty, he embarked on a journey by horseback from Buenos Aires to Washington DC. At the time most would assume this could not be done. A newspaper at the time declared "Impossible! Absurd! The man must be mad!".

He wrote about his ride in a bestselling book called Southern Cross to Pole Star, The Ride (or Tschiffely's Ride for short), in which he recounts his epic three-year journey from April 1925 to September 1928 on two native Criollo horses named Mancha (meaning Spot) and Gato (meaning Cat), direct descendants of horses brought to Argentina by the conquistador Pedro de Mendoza in 1535, the first horses brought to the new world. These horses were of the best Spanish stock, at the time, the best in Europe, which had gone feral in the pampas. They were legendary for their toughness, intelligence and stamina.

In December 1933, he married radio performer Violet Marquesita. After Tschiffely's Ride, Tschiffely became a famous author and moved with his wife Violet to London where he continued to write more books, one of which was a biography of his friend Robert Bontine Cunninghame Graham who had died in 1936. In 1937 he returned to South America and made another journey, by car, to the southern tip of the continent, recording his experiences among the natives and the changes brought on by modernity in This Way Southward (1940).

In February 1998, and according to his final wishes, his ashes were buried next to Gato and Mancha in Emilio Solanet's farm, near Ayacucho, Argentina. Solanet was an Argentinian National Deputy who bought the two horses to Tehuelche chief Liempichún, in Patagonia.

== Works ==
- Tschiffely's Ride or The Ride or Southern Cross to Pole Star (1933). ISBN 978-1-59048-011-3
- The Tale of Two Horses (1934) ISBN 1-59048-012-0. The story of The Ride from the viewpoint of his two horses, Mancha and Gato.
- Bridle Paths: the story of a ride through rural England (1936). Travels through Britain on horseback, a poetic look at a now-vanished Britain, as it was before the advent of suburbia changed it forever. ISBN 1-59048-013-9
- Don Roberto: The Life of R B Cunninghame Graham (1937). London: William Heinneman Ltd.
- Coricancha (garden of gold): Discovery of Peru and conquest of the Inca empire (1943). See also Coricancha.
- This Way Southward (Norton & Co., New York, 1945). Recounts his journey by car to Tierra del Fuego and emotional reunion with his two horses Mancha and Gato.
- Ming and Ping (1948).
- Bohemia Junction (1951). A biography of 40 years of travel and adventure. ISBN 1-59048-015-5
- Round and about Spain (1952) ISBN 978-1-59048-268-1.
- Matt Cass – a tale of a man from the north (1953).

== Others' works ==
Tschiffely was a friend and admirer of Scots-Australian bush poet Will H. Ogilvie. Ogilvie's poem Saddles again makes reference to Tschiffely's horses 'Gato' and 'Mancha' used in the Ride.
