= Matías Sarraute =

Argentine footballer

Personal information
- Full name: Matías Ezequiel Sarraute
- Date of birth: 1 October 1990 (age 36)
- Place of birth: Mar del Plata, Argentina
- Height: 1.78 m (5 ft 10 in)
- Position: Midfielder

Team information
- Current team: River Plate MdP

Youth career
- Aldosivi

Senior career*
Years	Team	Apps	(Gls)
2009–2013	Aldosivi	37	(0)
2013–2014	Alvarado	21	(0)
2014–2015	Deportes Concepción	21	(3)
2016	Independiente Neuquén	11	(3)
2016	Colón FC		(1)
2017	Portuguesa	5	(0)
2017	Unión Aconquija	9	(0)
2018–2019	Unión Sunchales	22	(2)
2019–2020	Cipolletti	16	(1)
2021	Huracán FC	9	(2)
2022	Liniers	18	(1)
2022–2023	Huracán de White	5	(1)
2023	Liniers	27	(2)
2024–	River Plate MdP	–	(–)
- * Club domestic league appearances and goals as of 20 November 2024

Matías Ezequiel Sarraute (born October 1, 1990, in Mar del Plata, Argentina) is an Argentine football midfielder who plays for River Plate de Mar del Plata.

== Teams ==
- (Argentina) Aldosivi 2010–2013
- (Argentina) Alvarado 2013–2014
- (Chile) Deportes Concepción 2014–2015
- (Argentina) Independiente de Neuquén 2016
- (Ecuador) Colón FC 2016
- (Venezuela) Portuguesa 2017
- (Argentina) Unión Aconquija 2017
- (Argentina) Unión de Sunchales 2018–2019
- (Argentina) Cipolletti 2019–2020
- (Uruguay) Huracán FC 2021
- (Argentina) Liniers 2022
- (Argentina) Huracán de Ingeniero White 2022–2023
- (Argentina) Liniers 2023
- (Argentina) River Plate de Mar del Plata 2024–present
