= Paulina Trotz =

Argentine Biologist and Model (born 1986)

- Born: June 30, 1986 (age 39)
- Citizenship: Argentine
- Occupations: Scientist; Model
- Spouse: Gonzalo Tiesi (m. 2012)
- Children: 4
- Parent(s): Ernesto Trotz and María Laura Fernández Roussee

Paulina Trotz (June 30, 1986) is an Argentine Biologist and Model.

== Biography ==
Paulina Trotz was born on June 30, 1986. She is the second daughter of Ernesto Trotz and María Laura Fernández Roussee, one of the Trix.

== Personal life ==
On August 5, 2012, she married the retired Argentine rugby union player, Gonzalo Tiesi. On May 26, 2014, she gave birth to the couple's first child, a boy, whom they called Gonzalo Ignacio Tiesi. On December 15, 2015, she gave birth to the couple's second child, a boy, whom they called Carlos Emilio Tiesi. On October 14, 2020, she gave birth to the couple's third child, a boy, whom they called Borja Tiesi. On September 21, 2022, she gave birth to the couple's fourth child, a girl, whom they called Esmeralda Tiesi.

== See also ==
- List of Argentines
