= Susana Giqueaux =

Argentine poet, writer and translator

Susana Giqueaux (1904–2004) was an Argentine poet, writer and translator. She was born in Nogoyá, Argentina to a family of recently arrived immigrants from France. The family later moved to Concepción del Uruguay where Susana spent much of her life. She was fluent in French, and translated French-language poets such as Jules Supervielle, Saint-John Perse and Oscar Milosz. She also wrote fiction; her novel Mar de fondo was the first winner of the National Foundation for the Arts prize (Fondo Nacional de las Artes) in Argentina in 1977.

The eldest of eight children, Giqueaux never married and died aged around 100 in 2004.

== Works ==
=== Poetry ===
- L'unique lumière (1980)

=== Novels ===
- Mar de fondo (1977)
- La pandilla (1982)
- Y los días siguen (1997)
