= Uladislao Augier =

Argentine politician

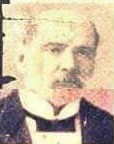
- Born: Uladislao Augier Correa de Soria y Medrano; July 4, 1826
- Died: January 5, 1908 (aged 81)

Uladislao Augier (July 4, 1826 – January 5, 1908) was an Argentine politician and the first National Deputy for the province of Catamarca.
