= Polo pony =

Horse used in the game polo

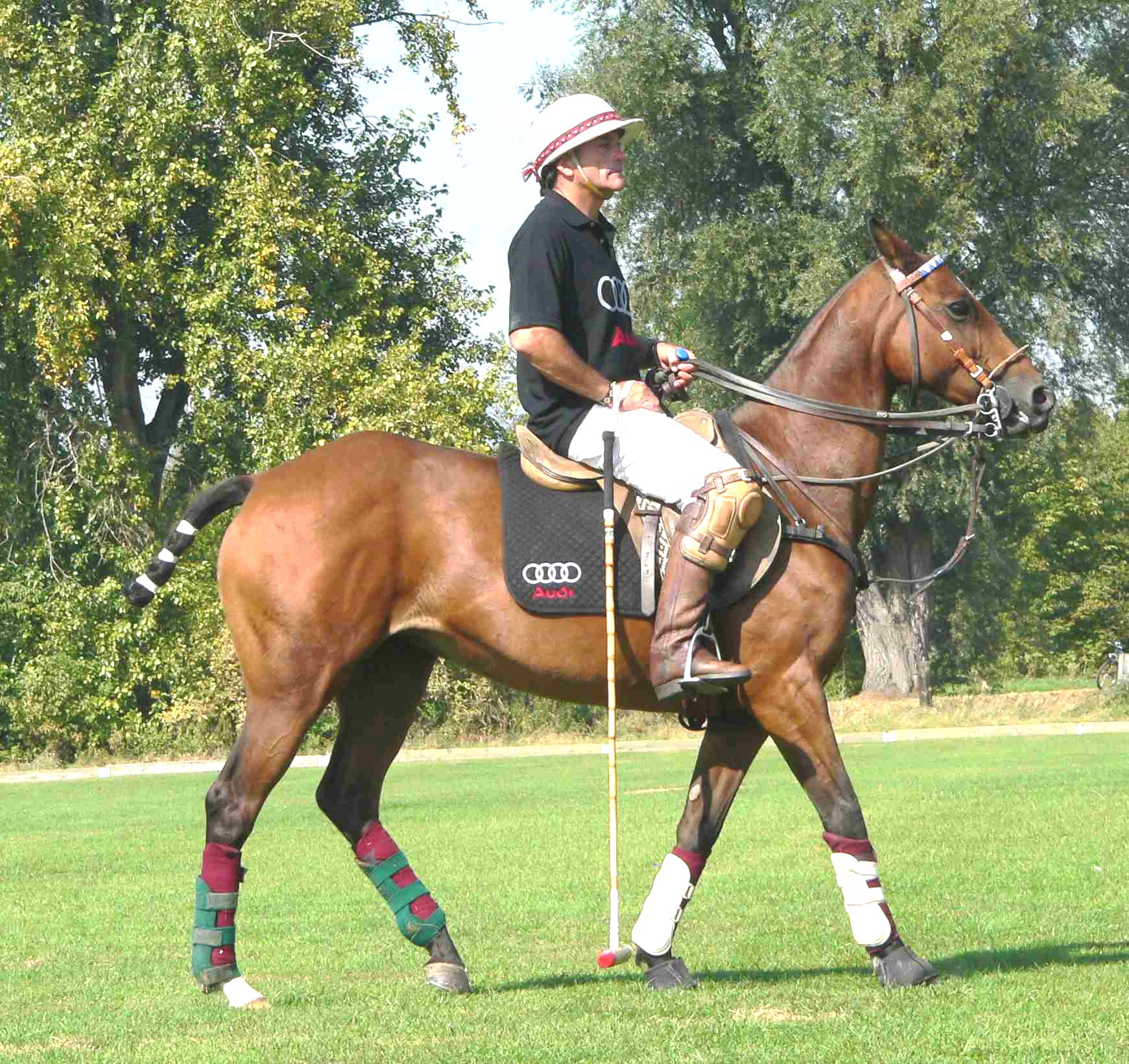
A polo pony

A polo pony is a horse used in the game of polo. They may be of any breed or combination of breeds, though many have a significant amount of Thoroughbred breeding. They are called "ponies", but that is a reference to their agile type rather than their size; almost all are horse-sized. They require considerable training and ongoing conditioning, and because each rider requires at least two horses in a single match, this can be a considerable expense. When playing, polo ponies have their manes roached and tails braided so that there is no danger of being tangled in the mallet.

== Size ==
Depending on time and location, the height of polo ponies has varied from about 13 hands (52 inches, 132 cm) in the sixteenth century to modern horses of 15 hands (60 inches, 152 cm) and over. Today, most polo ponies stand around 15.1 hands (61 inches, 155 cm), although it is not unusual to see a horse over 16 hands. Although they are called "ponies", this is a reference to their agile type rather than their size. True pony breeds typically stand a maximum of 14.2 hands (58 inches, 147 cm).

== Breeds ==
Various breeds used include mountain ponies from the Himalayas, Manipur ponies from Manipur, Arabians and the ever-popular Thoroughbred and its crosses. In the United States, Thoroughbreds and Quarter Horses are often crossed to produce polo ponies, while in recent years crosses of Thoroughbreds and Criollo horses from Argentina have become popular. In Australia, Australian Stock Horses are the most common breed used in polo.

The Argentine Polo Horse is a breed developed from crossing purebred racehorses with rustic country horses, resulting in a horse prized for its agility and skill rather than beauty. With a long neck, slender body, strong limbs, wide and smooth legs, and an elegantly implanted tail, these horses are built for the demands of polo. Since the 1970s, the emphasis has shifted to speed and endurance, characteristics derived from their thoroughbred lineage. Grooming practices, such as braiding the tail and trimming the mane, ensure that nothing interferes with their performance during the game.

== Preparation ==
Polo ponies need to be trained so that they are not afraid to bump into other horses, and not to shy at the ball or at mallets swinging near their heads. They need to be quick and agile so they can turn and follow the ball through its many movements. They also need to be in good physical condition; there are usually four to six chukkas per match, each chukka lasting seven and a half minutes, with the horse being on the move throughout. It is typical for a single player to have numerous horses available for each match, using a separate horse for each chukka, sometimes two. Thus there are significant costs of ownership and time required for exercise and conditioning of a polo string.

== Grooming ==
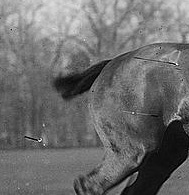
Docked and banged tail on a polo pony, photographed between 1910 and 1915

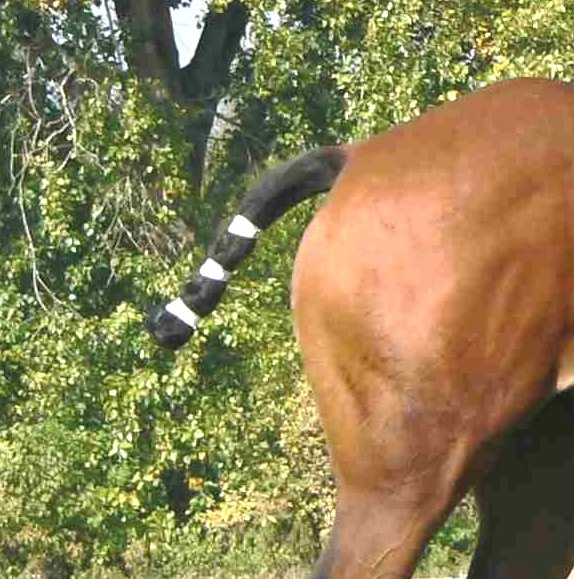
A modern polo pony's tail prepared for competition

Polo ponies have their manes roached and their tails plaited up before a match, so that the polo mallet will not get tangled in them. Formerly, their tails would be docked and banged. Today, polo ponies in competition often have their dock trimmed or shaved, and the skirt of the tail is braided and folded up against the tailbone. The braid is tied off with a lock of hair excluded from the braid, taped, or tied off and taped.

== See also ==
- Horseball
- Polocrosse
