= Guillem Augier Novella =

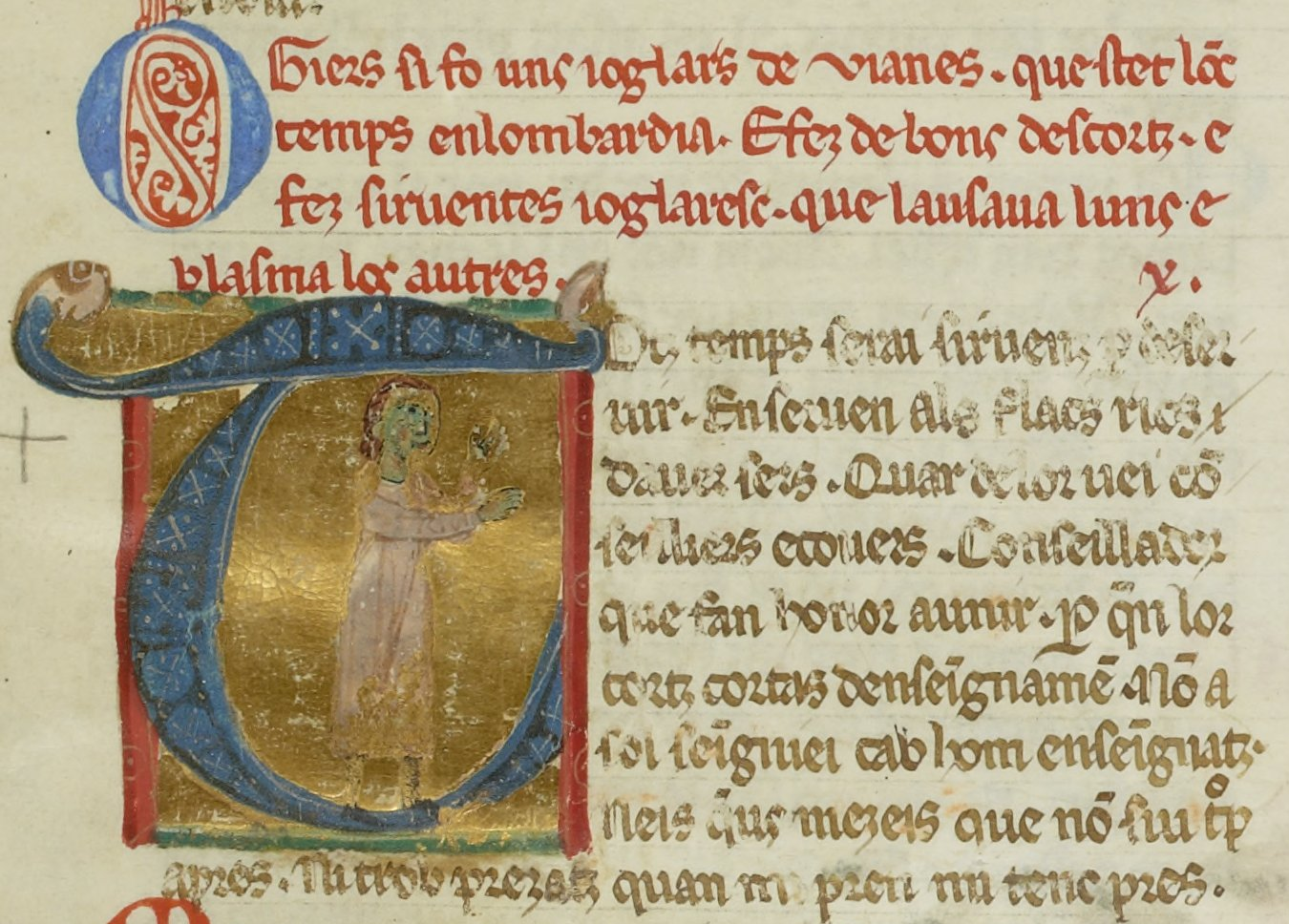
Ogiers si fo uns ioglars de vianes, questet lonc temps in lombardia. . . "Augier was a jongleur from the Viennois, who stayed a long time in Lombardy. . ."

Guillem Augier (Note: His surname is variously spelled Ogier or Ozier, and on chansonnier names him Guillem Mogier de Bezers, making him from Béziers.) Novella was a troubadour from Vienne in the Dauphinois who lived most of his adulthood in Lombardy and was active as a minstrel in the early or mid thirteenth century. According to his late thirteenth-century vida, "he composed good descartz and sirventes in the manner of jongleurs, in which he praised some and blamed others."

Augier spent his early career at the court of the Emperor Frederick II, and was there associated with such figures as Guilhem Figueira and Aimery de Pégulhan, until 1230. Among Augier's most famous works is his sirventes (a planh or lament) now entitled A People Grieving for the Death of their Lord, which commemorates either the murder of Raymond I Trencavel in 1167 or, as is more preferred, of Raymond Roger Trencavel in 1209. It has been described as a "funeral oration", but its contemporaneousness with the death of Raymond Roger has been called into question recently. It was probably written at a much later date. The chief purpose of the sirventes may be to mourn the lost culture of Languedoc before the Albigensian Crusade and the "lord" of the story is probably a stereotype meant to represent that culture. It can therefore be viewed as representative of a genre of anti-Crusading verse prevalent in the trovatore traditions of Italy at the time. On the other hand, it is said to convey a "sense of personal loss" and not "opposition to the expedition".

== Sources ==
- Graham-Leigh, Elaine. The Southern French Nobility and the Albigensian Crusade. Woodbridge: The Boydell Press, 2005. ISBN 1-84383-129-5.
- Siberry, Elizabeth. Criticism of Crusading, 1095–1274. Oxford: Clarendon Press, 1985. ISBN 0-19-821953-9.
