= List of Argentine deputies, 2017–2019 =

This is a list of members of the Argentine Chamber of Deputies from 10 December 2017 to 9 December 2019.

== Composition ==
=== By province ===
| Province | Deputies | Population (2010) |
|---|---|---|
| Buenos Aires | 70 | 15,625,084 |
| Buenos Aires City | 25 | 2,890,151 |
| Catamarca | 5 | 367,828 |
| Chaco | 7 | 1,053,466 |
| Chubut | 5 | 506,668 |
| Córdoba | 18 | 3,304,825 |
| Corrientes | 7 | 993,338 |
| Entre Ríos | 9 | 1,236,300 |
| Formosa | 5 | 527,895 |
| Jujuy | 6 | 672,260 |
| La Pampa | 5 | 316,940 |
| La Rioja | 5 | 331,847 |
| Mendoza | 10 | 1,741,610 |
| Misiones | 7 | 1,097,829 |
| Neuquén | 5 | 550,334 |
| Río Negro | 5 | 633,374 |
| Salta | 7 | 1,215,207 |
| San Juan | 6 | 680,427 |
| San Luis | 5 | 431,588 |
| Santa Cruz | 5 | 272,524 |
| Santa Fe | 19 | 3,200,736 |
| Santiago del Estero | 7 | 896,461 |
| Tierra del Fuego | 5 | 126,190 |
| Tucumán | 9 | 1,448,200 |

=== By political groups ===
| Alliance | Party | Leader |
|---|---|---|
| Cambiemos (108) | Unión PRO (55) | Mario Negri |
| Cambiemos (108) | Unión Cívica Radical (40) | Mario Negri |
| Cambiemos (108) | Coalición Cívica (10) | Mario Negri |
| Cambiemos (108) | Frente Cívico y Social de Catamarca (1) | Mario Negri |
| Cambiemos (108) | Partido por la Justicia Social (1) | Mario Negri |
| Cambiemos (108) | Salta Somos Todos (1) | Mario Negri |
| Frente para la Victoria-PJ (66) | Frente para la Victoria-PJ (65) | Agustín Rossi |
| Frente para la Victoria-PJ (66) | Concertación-FORJA (1) | Agustín Rossi |
| Argentina Federal (33) | Justicialista (18) | Pablo Francisco Juan Kosiner |
| Argentina Federal (33) | Frente de la Concordia Misionero (5) | Pablo Francisco Juan Kosiner |
| Argentina Federal (33) | Córdoba Federal (4) | Pablo Francisco Juan Kosiner |
| Argentina Federal (33) | Justicialista por Tucumán (3) | Pablo Francisco Juan Kosiner |
| Argentina Federal (33) | Todos Juntos por San Juan (1) | Pablo Francisco Juan Kosiner |
| Argentina Federal (33) | Somos San Juan (1) | Pablo Francisco Juan Kosiner |
| Argentina Federal (33) | Partido Bloquista de San Juan (1) | Pablo Francisco Juan Kosiner |
| Frente Renovador UNA (21) | Federal Unidos por una Nueva Argentina (18) | Graciela Camaño |
| Frente Renovador UNA (21) | Cultura, Educación y Trabajo (1) | Graciela Camaño |
| Frente Renovador UNA (21) | Córdoba Trabajo y Producción (1) | Graciela Camaño |
| Frente Renovador UNA (21) | Trabajo y Dignidad (1) | Graciela Camaño |
| Frente Cívico por Santiago (6) | | Hugo Orlando Infante |
| Peronismo para la Victoria-Libres del Sur (5) | Peronismo para la Victoria (3) | Leonardo Grosso |
| Peronismo para la Victoria-Libres del Sur (5) | Libres del Sur (1) | Leonardo Grosso |
| Unidad Justicialista (4) | | Ivana María Bianchi |
| Evolución Radical (3) | | Martín Lousteau |
| PTS-Frente de Izquierda (2) | | Nicolás del Caño |
| Elijo Catamarca (2) | | Gustavo Arturo Saadi |
| One deputy parties (7) | | |
| One deputy parties (7) | Bloque Protectora (1) | José Luis Ramón |
| One deputy parties (7) | Frente Progresista Cívico y Social (1) | Luis Contigiani |
| One deputy parties (7) | Frente de Izquierda y de los Trabajadores (1) | Romina del Plá |
| One deputy parties (7) | Movimiento Popular Neuquino (1) | Alma "Chani" Sapag |
| One deputy parties (7) | Nuevo Espacio Santafesino (1) | Alejandra Rodenas |
| One deputy parties (7) | Primero Argentina (1) | Alejandro Ramos |
| One deputy parties (7) | Somos Mendoza (1) | Omar Chafí Félix |

== Election cycles ==
| Election | Term | |
| Election | Start | End |
|---|---|---|
| 2015 | 10 December 2015 | 9 December 2019 |
| 2017 | 10 December 2017 | 9 December 2021 |

== List of Deputies ==
The table is sorted by provinces in alphabetical order, and then with their deputies in alphabetical order by their surnames. All deputies start their term on December 10, and end it on December 9 of the corresponding years, except when noted.

| Province | Portrait | Deputy | Party | Term start | Term end |
|---|---|---|---|---|---|
| Buenos Aires | | Samanta María Celeste Acerenza | Unión PRO | 2015 | 2019 |
| Buenos Aires | | Juan Aicega | Unión PRO | 2017 | 2021 |
| Buenos Aires | | Laura Valeria Alonso | Frente para la Victoria-PJ | 2017 | 2021 |
| Buenos Aires | | María Cristina Álvarez Rodríguez | Frente para la Victoria-PJ | 2015 | 2019 |
| Buenos Aires | | Eduardo Pablo Amadeo | Unión PRO | 2015 | 2019 |
| Buenos Aires | | Pablo Miguel Ansaloni | Frente para la Victoria-PJ | 2017 | 2021 |
| Buenos Aires | | Daniel Fernando Arroyo | Federal Unidos por una Nueva Argentina | 2017 | 2021 |
| Buenos Aires | | Fernando Asencio | Federal Unidos por una Nueva Argentina | 2018 (Note: Since 23 May 2018. Replaced Alberto Roberti after his death on 17 May 2018.) | 2019 |
| Buenos Aires | | Karina Banfi | Unión Cívica Radical | 2015 | 2019 |
| Buenos Aires | | Miguel Ángel Bazze | Unión Cívica Radical | 2015 | 2019 |
| Buenos Aires | | Hernán Berisso | Unión PRO | 2017 | 2021 |
| Buenos Aires | | Gustavo Bevilacqua | Federal Unidos por una Nueva Argentina | 2015 | 2019 |
| Buenos Aires | | Diego Luis Bossio | Justicialista | 2015 | 2019 |
| Buenos Aires | | Eduardo Bucca | Justicialista | 2017 | 2021 |
| Buenos Aires | | Sergio Omar Buil | Unión PRO | 2015 | 2019 |
| Buenos Aires | | Graciela Camaño | Federal Unidos por una Nueva Argentina | 2015 | 2019 |
| Buenos Aires | | Marcela Campagnoli | Coalición Cívica | 2017 | 2021 |
| Buenos Aires | | Javier Campos | Coalición Cívica | 2017 | 2021 |
| Buenos Aires | | Carlos Daniel Castagneto | Frente para la Victoria-PJ | 2015 | 2019 |
| Buenos Aires | | Walter Correa | Frente para la Victoria-PJ | 2017 | 2021 |
| Buenos Aires | | José Ignacio de Mendiguren | Federal Unidos por una Nueva Argentina | 2017 | 2021 |
| Buenos Aires | | Eduardo Enrique de Pedro | Frente para la Victoria-PJ | 2015 | 2019 |
| Buenos Aires | | Julio de Vido | Frente para la Victoria-PJ | 2015 | 2017 (Note: Suspended member and in jail since 25 October 2017 for corruption charges.) |
| Buenos Aires | | Nicolás del Caño | PTS-Frente de Izquierda | 2017 | 2021 |
| Buenos Aires | | Romina del Plá | Frente de Izquierda y de los Trabajadores | 2017 | 2021 |
| Buenos Aires | | Alejandro Carlos Augusto Echegaray | Unión Cívica Radical | 2015 | 2019 |
| Buenos Aires | | Fernando Espinoza | Frente para la Victoria-PJ | 2017 | 2021 |
| Buenos Aires | | Ezequiel Fernández Langan | Unión PRO | 2017 | 2021 |
| Buenos Aires | | Carlos Alberto Fernández | Unión Cívica Radical | 2017 | 2021 |
| Buenos Aires | | Héctor "Toty" Flores | Coalición Cívica | 2017 | 2021 |
| Buenos Aires | | Francisco Abel Furlán | Frente para la Victoria-PJ | 2015 | 2019 |
| Buenos Aires | | Nathalia Inés González Seligra | PTS-Frente de Izquierda | 2017 (Note: Since 9 June 2017. Replaced Néstor Pitrola after his resignation.) | 2019 |
| Buenos Aires | | Adrián Eduardo Grana | Frente para la Victoria-PJ | 2015 | 2019 |
| Buenos Aires | | Leonardo Grosso | Peronismo para la Victoria | 2015 | 2019 |
| Buenos Aires | | María Isabel Guerín | Frente para la Victoria-PJ | 2015 | 2019 |
| Buenos Aires | | Daniel Andrés Lipovetzky | Unión PRO | 2015 | 2019 |
| Buenos Aires | | Silvia Gabriela Lospennato | Unión PRO | 2015 | 2019 |
| Buenos Aires | | Mónica Macha | Frente para la Victoria-PJ | 2017 | 2021 |
| Buenos Aires | | Martín Nicolás Medina | Unión PRO | 2017 | 2021 |
| Buenos Aires | | Josefina Mendoza | Unión Cívica Radical | 2017 | 2021 |
| Buenos Aires | | Mayra Soledad Mendoza | Frente para la Victoria-PJ | 2015 | 2019 |
| Buenos Aires | | Guillermo Tristán Montenegro | Unión PRO | 2017 | 2021 |
| Buenos Aires | | Emilio Monzó | Unión PRO | 2015 | 2019 |
| Buenos Aires | | Cecilia Moreau | Federal Unidos por una Nueva Argentina | 2015 | 2019 |
| Buenos Aires | | Leopoldo Raúl Guido Moreau | Frente para la Victoria-PJ | 2017 | 2021 |
| Buenos Aires | | Juan Facundo Moyano | Federal Unidos por una Nueva Argentina | 2015 | 2019 |
| Buenos Aires | | María Graciela Ocaña | Unión PRO | 2017 | 2021 |
| Buenos Aires | | Marcela Fabiana Passo | Federal Unidos por una Nueva Argentina | 2015 | 2019 |
| Buenos Aires | | Raúl Joaquín Pérez | Federal Unidos por una Nueva Argentina | 2015 | 2019 |
| Buenos Aires | | María Carla Piccolomini | Unión PRO | 2017 | 2021 |
| Buenos Aires | | Horacio Pietragalla Corti | Frente para la Victoria-PJ | 2017 | 2021 |
| Buenos Aires | | Fabio José Quetglas | Unión Cívica Radical | 2017 | 2021 |
| Buenos Aires | | María Fernanda Raverta | Frente para la Victoria-PJ | 2015 | 2019 |
| Buenos Aires | | Alberto Oscar Roberti | Justicialista | 2015 | 2018 (Note: Died on 17 May 2018. Replaced by Fernando Asencio on 23 May 2018.) |
| Buenos Aires | | Rodrigo Martín Rodríguez | Frente para la Victoria-PJ | 2015 | 2019 |
| Buenos Aires | | Laura Russo | Frente para la Victoria-PJ | 2017 | 2021 |
| Buenos Aires | | Roberto Salvarezza | Frente para la Victoria-PJ | 2017 | 2021 |
| Buenos Aires | | Daniel Scioli | Frente para la Victoria-PJ | 2017 | 2021 |
| Buenos Aires | | Carlos Américo Selva | Federal Unidos por una Nueva Argentina | 2015 | 2019 |
| Buenos Aires | | Magdalena Sierra | Frente para la Victoria-PJ | 2017 | 2021 |
| Buenos Aires | | Vanesa Siley | Frente para la Victoria-PJ | 2017 | 2021 |
| Buenos Aires | | Felipe Carlos Solá | Federal Unidos por una Nueva Argentina | 2017 | 2021 |
| Buenos Aires | | Luis Rodolfo Tailhade | Frente para la Victoria-PJ | 2015 | 2019 |
| Buenos Aires | | Pablo Torello | Unión PRO | 2015 | 2019 |
| Buenos Aires | | Mirta Tundis | Federal Unidos por una Nueva Argentina | 2017 | 2021 |
| Buenos Aires | | Paula Marcela Urroz | Unión PRO | 2015 | 2019 |
| Buenos Aires | | Fernanda Vallejos | Frente para la Victoria-PJ | 2017 | 2021 |
| Buenos Aires | | Natalia Soledad Villa | Unión PRO | 2017 | 2021 |
| Buenos Aires | | Luana Volnovich | Frente para la Victoria-PJ | 2015 | 2019 |
| Buenos Aires | | Waldo Ezequiel Wolff | Unión PRO | 2015 | 2019 |
| Buenos Aires | | Hugo Yasky | Frente para la Victoria-PJ | 2017 | 2021 |
| Buenos Aires City | | Juan Cabandié | Frente para la Victoria-PJ | 2017 | 2021 |
| Buenos Aires City | | Elisa María Avelina Carrió | Coalición Cívica | 2017 | 2021 |
| Buenos Aires City | | Ana Carla Carrizo | Evolución Radical | 2017 | 2021 |
| Buenos Aires City | | Gabriela Cerruti | Frente para la Victoria-PJ | 2017 | 2021 |
| Buenos Aires City | | Victoria Analía Donda Pérez | Libres del Sur | 2015 | 2019 |
| Buenos Aires City | | Jorge Ricardo Enríquez | Unión PRO | 2017 (Note: Since 18 December 2017. Replaced Joanna Agostina Picetti after she was not allowed to assume over accusations of child abuse.) | 2021 |
| Buenos Aires City | | Daniel Filmus | Frente para la Victoria-PJ | 2017 | 2021 |
| Buenos Aires City | | Alejandro García | Unión PRO | 2017 | 2021 |
| Buenos Aires City | | Nilda Celia Garré | Frente para la Victoria-PJ | 2015 | 2019 |
| Buenos Aires City | | Álvaro Gustavo González | Unión PRO | 2015 | 2019 |
| Buenos Aires City | | Anabella Ruth Hers Cabral | Unión PRO | 2015 | 2019 |
| Buenos Aires City | | Fernando Adolfo Iglesias | Unión PRO | 2017 | 2021 |
| Buenos Aires City | | Axel Kicillof | Frente para la Victoria-PJ | 2015 | 2019 |
| Buenos Aires City | | Andrés Larroque | Frente para la Victoria-PJ | 2015 | 2019 |
| Buenos Aires City | | Marco Lavagna | Federal Unidos por una Nueva Argentina | 2015 | 2019 |
| Buenos Aires City | | Juan Manuel López | Coalición Cívica | 2017 | 2021 |
| Buenos Aires City | | Martín Lousteau | Evolución Radical | 2017 | 2021 |
| Buenos Aires City | | Paula Mariana Oliveto Lago | Coalición Cívica | 2017 | 2021 |
| Buenos Aires City | | Carla Betina Pitiot | Federal Unidos por una Nueva Argentina | 2015 | 2019 |
| Buenos Aires City | | Carmen Polledo | Unión PRO | 2017 | 2021 |
| Buenos Aires City | | Cornelia Schmidt-Liermann | Unión PRO | 2015 | 2019 |
| Buenos Aires City | | Facundo Suárez Lastra | Unión Cívica Radical | 2017 | 2021 |
| Buenos Aires City | | Pablo Gabriel Tonelli | Unión PRO | 2015 | 2019 |
| Buenos Aires City | | Juan Carlos Villalonga | Unión PRO | 2015 | 2019 |
| Buenos Aires City | | Marcelo Germán Wechsler | Unión PRO | 2015 | 2019 |
| Catamarca | | Eduardo Segundo Brizuela del Moral | Frente Cívico y Social de Catamarca | 2017 | 2021 |
| Catamarca | | Silvana Micaela Ginocchio | Elijo Catamarca | 2017 | 2021 |
| Catamarca | | Véronica Mercado | Frente para la Victoria-PJ | 2015 | 2019 |
| Catamarca | | Gustavo Arturo Saadi | Elijo Catamarca | 2017 | 2021 |
| Catamarca | | Orieta Cecilia Vera González | Coalición Cívica | 2015 | 2019 |
| Chaco | | Aída Beatriz Máxima Ayala | Unión Cívica Radical | 2017 | 2021 |
| Chaco | | Horacio Goicoechea | Unión Cívica Radical | 2015 | 2019 |
| Chaco | | María Lucila Masin | Frente para la Victoria-PJ | 2015 | 2019 |
| Chaco | | Juan Mosqueda | Justicialista | 2017 | 2021 |
| Chaco | | Elda Pértile | Justicialista | 2017 | 2021 |
| Chaco | | Analía Rach Quiroga | Frente para la Victoria-PJ | 2015 | 2019 |
| Chaco | | Alicia Terada | Coalición Cívica | 2017 | 2021 |
| Chubut | | Santiago Nicolás Igon | Frente para la Victoria-PJ | 2015 | 2019 |
| Chubut | | Ana María Llanos Massa | Frente para la Victoria-PJ | 2015 | 2019 |
| Chubut | | Gustavo Menna | Unión Cívica Radical | 2017 | 2021 |
| Chubut | | Rosa Rosario Muñoz | Trabajo y Dignidad | 2017 | 2021 |
| Chubut | | Jorge Taboada | Cultura, Educación y Trabajo | 2015 | 2019 |
| Córdoba | | Brenda Lis Austin | Unión Cívica Radical | 2017 | 2021 |
| Córdoba | | Héctor Baldassi | Unión PRO | 2017 | 2021 |
| Córdoba | | Juan Fernando Brügge | Córdoba Federal | 2015 | 2019 |
| Córdoba | | María Soledad Carrizo | Unión Cívica Radical | 2017 | 2021 |
| Córdoba | | Pablo Carro | Frente para la Victoria-PJ | 2017 | 2021 |
| Córdoba | | Paulo Leonardo Cassinerio | Córdoba Federal | 2017 | 2021 |
| Córdoba | | Gabriela Beatriz Estévez | Frente para la Victoria-PJ | 2015 | 2019 |
| Córdoba | | Gabriel Alberto Frizza | Unión PRO | 2017 | 2021 |
| Córdoba | | Martín Miguel Llaryora | Córdoba Federal | 2017 | 2021 |
| Córdoba | | Leonor María Martínez Villada | Coalición Cívica | 2015 | 2019 |
| Córdoba | | Nicolás María Massot | Unión PRO | 2015 | 2019 |
| Córdoba | | Diego Matías Mestre | Unión Cívica Radical | 2017 | 2021 |
| Córdoba | | Adriana Mónica Nazario | Córdoba Trabajo y Producción | 2015 | 2019 |
| Córdoba | | Mario Raúl Negri | Unión Cívica Radical | 2015 | 2019 |
| Córdoba | | Juan Manuel Pereyra | Concertación-FORJA | 2015 | 2019 |
| Córdoba | | Pedro Javier Pretto | Unión PRO | 2015 | 2019 |
| Córdoba | | Olga María Rista | Unión Cívica Radical | 2015 | 2019 |
| Córdoba | | Alejandra María Vigo | Córdoba Federal | 2017 | 2021 |
| Corrientes | | Sofía Brambilla | Unión PRO | 2017 | 2021 |
| Corrientes | | Julián Dindart | Unión Cívica Radical | 2015 | 2019 |
| Corrientes | | Araceli Ferreyra | Peronismo para la Victoria | 2015 | 2019 |
| Corrientes | | Oscar Alberto Macias | Justicialista | 2015 | 2019 |
| Corrientes | | Estela Mercedes Regidor Belledone | Unión Cívica Radical | 2017 | 2021 |
| Corrientes | | Jorge Antonio Romero | Frente para la Victoria-PJ | 2017 | 2021 |
| Corrientes | | José Arnaldo Ruiz Aragón | Frente para la Victoria-PJ | 2015 | 2019 |
| Entre Ríos | | Juan José Bahillo | Justicialista | 2017 | 2021 |
| Entre Ríos | | Atilio Francisco Salvador Benedetti | Unión Cívica Radical | 2017 | 2021 |
| Entre Ríos | | Mayda Cresto | Justicialista | 2017 | 2021 |
| Entre Ríos | | Alicia Fregonese | Unión PRO | 2017 | 2021 |
| Entre Ríos | | Yanina Celeste Gayol | Unión PRO | 2015 | 2019 |
| Entre Ríos | | Juan Manuel Huss | Frente para la Victoria-PJ | 2015 | 2019 |
| Entre Ríos | | Jorge Enrique Lacoste | Unión Cívica Radical | 2017 | 2021 |
| Entre Ríos | | Marcelo Alejandro Monfort | Unión Cívica Radical | 2015 | 2019 |
| Entre Ríos | | Julio Rodolfo Solanas | Frente para la Victoria-PJ | 2015 | 2019 |
| Formosa | | Mario Horacio Arce | Unión Cívica Radical | 2017 | 2021 |
| Formosa | | Luis Eugenio Basterra | Frente para la Victoria-PJ | 2015 | 2019 |
| Formosa | | Gustavo Ramiro Fernández Patri | Frente para la Victoria-PJ | 2017 | 2021 |
| Formosa | | Martín Osvaldo Hernández | Unión Cívica Radical | 2015 | 2019 |
| Formosa | | Inés Beatriz Lotto | Frente para la Victoria-PJ | 2015 | 2019 |
| Jujuy | | María Gabriela Burgos | Unión Cívica Radical | 2017 | 2021 |
| Jujuy | | José Luis Martiarena | Justicialista | 2017 | 2021 |
| Jujuy | | Silvia Alejandra Martínez | Unión Cívica Radical | 2015 | 2019 |
| Jujuy | | María Carolina Moisés | Justicialista | 2017 (Note: Since 18 December 2017. Replaced Guillermo Snopek after he resigned on 9 December 2017 to become national senator.) | 2019 |
| Jujuy | | Osmar Antonio Monaldi | Unión PRO | 2017 | 2021 |
| Jujuy | | Alejandro Francisco Snopek | Federal Unidos por una Nueva Argentina | 2015 | 2019 |
| La Pampa | | Melina Aida Delú | Justicialista | 2017 | 2021 |
| La Pampa | | Daniel Ricardo Kroneberger | Unión Cívica Radical | 2015 | 2019 |
| La Pampa | | Martín Maquieyra | Unión PRO | 2017 | 2021 |
| La Pampa | | Ariel Rauschenberger | Justicialista | 2017 | 2021 |
| La Pampa | | Sergio Raúl Ziliotto | Justicialista | 2015 | 2019 |
| La Rioja | | Danilo Adrián Flores | Justicialista | 2017 | 2021 |
| La Rioja | | Luis Beder Herrera | Justicialista | 2015 | 2019 |
| La Rioja | | Karina Alejandra Molina | Unión PRO | 2015 | 2019 |
| La Rioja | | Héctor Enrique Olivares | Unión Cívica Radical | 2015 | 2019 |
| La Rioja | | Julio Enrique Sahad | Unión PRO | 2017 | 2021 |
| Mendoza | | Elva Susana Balbo | Unión PRO | 2015 | 2018 (Note: Resigned on 4 April 2018 to become a member of Women 20. Replaced by Sebastián Bragagnolo on 9 May 2018.) |
| Mendoza | | Luis Gustavo Borsani | Unión Cívica Radical | 2015 | 2019 |
| Mendoza | | Sebastián Bragagnolo | Unión PRO | 2018 (Note: Since 9 May 2018. Replaced Elva Susana Balbo after her resignation on 4 April 2018.) | 2019 |
| Mendoza | | Guillermo Ramón Carmona | Frente para la Victoria-PJ | 2015 | 2019 |
| Mendoza | | Omar Chafí Félix | Somos Mendoza | 2017 | 2021 |
| Mendoza | | Stella Maris Huczak | Unión PRO | 2015 | 2019 |
| Mendoza | | Pedro Rubén Miranda | Justicialista | 2015 | 2019 |
| Mendoza | | Claudia Najul | Unión Cívica Radical | 2017 | 2021 |
| Mendoza | | Luis Alfonso Petri | Unión Cívica Radical | 2017 | 2021 |
| Mendoza | | José Luis Ramón | Bloque Protectora | 2017 | 2021 |
| Mendoza | | Federico Raúl Zamarbide | Unión Cívica Radical | 2017 | 2021 |
| Misiones | | María Cristina Britez | Frente para la Victoria-PJ | 2015 | 2019 |
| Misiones | | Verónica Derna | Frente de la Concordia Misionero | 2017 (Note: Since 18 December 2017. Replaced Maurice Closs after he resigned on 9 December 2017 to become national senator.) | 2019 |
| Misiones | | Daniel di Stefano | Frente de la Concordia Misionero | 2015 | 2019 |
| Misiones | | Jorge Daniel Franco | Frente de la Concordia Misionero | 2015 | 2019 |
| Misiones | | Flavia Morales | Frente de la Concordia Misionero | 2017 | 2021 |
| Misiones | | Luis Mario Pastori | Unión Cívica Radical | 2017 | 2021 |
| Misiones | | Ricardo Wellbach | Frente de la Concordia Misionero | 2017 | 2021 |
| Neuquén | | José Alberto Ciampini | Frente para la Victoria-PJ | 2015 | 2019 |
| Neuquén | | Leandro Gastón López Koenig | Unión PRO | 2015 | 2019 |
| Neuquén | | Norman Darío Martínez | Frente para la Victoria-PJ | 2017 | 2021 |
| Neuquén | | Alma "Chani" Sapag | Movimiento Popular Neuquino | 2017 | 2021 |
| Neuquén | | David Pablo Schlereth | Unión PRO | 2017 | 2021 |
| Río Negro | | Claudio Martín Doñate | Frente para la Victoria-PJ | 2015 | 2019 |
| Río Negro | | Silvia Renee Horne | Peronismo para la Victoria | 2015 | 2019 |
| Río Negro | | Lorena Matzen | Unión Cívica Radical | 2017 | 2021 |
| Río Negro | | María Emilia Soria | Frente para la Victoria-PJ | 2017 | 2021 |
| Río Negro | | Sergio Javier Wisky | Unión PRO | 2015 | 2019 |
| Salta | | Néstor Javier David | Justicialista | 2015 | 2019 |
| Salta | | Martín Grande | Unión PRO | 2017 | 2021 |
| Salta | | Pablo Francisco Juan Kosiner | Justicialista | 2015 | 2019 |
| Salta | | Sergio Napoleón Leavy | Frente para la Victoria-PJ | 2017 | 2021 |
| Salta | | Miguel Nanni | Unión Cívica Radical | 2015 | 2019 |
| Salta | | Alfredo Horacio Olmedo | Salta Somos Todos | 2015 | 2019 |
| Salta | | Andrés Zottos | Justicialista | 2017 | 2021 |
| San Juan | | Walberto Enrique Allende | Todos Juntos por San Juan | 2017 | 2021 |
| San Juan | | Eduardo Augusto Cáceres | Unión PRO | 2017 | 2021 |
| San Juan | | Graciela María Caselles | Partido Bloquista de San Juan | 2015 | 2019 |
| San Juan | | Sandra Daniela Castro | Frente para la Victoria-PJ | 2017 | 2021 |
| San Juan | | José Luis Gioja | Frente para la Victoria-PJ | 2015 | 2019 |
| San Juan | | María Florencia Peñaloza Marianetti | Somos San Juan | 2015 | 2019 |
| San Luis | | Karim Augusto Alume Sbodio | Unidad Justicialista | 2017 | 2021 |
| San Luis | | Ivana María Bianchi | Unidad Justicialista | 2015 | 2019 |
| San Luis | | José Luis Riccardo | Unión Cívica Radical | 2017 | 2021 |
| San Luis | | Victoria Rosso | Unidad Justicialista | 2017 | 2021 |
| San Luis | | Andrés Alberto Vallone | Unidad Justicialista | 2017 (Note: Since 18 December 2017. Replaced Claudio Poggi after he resigned on 9 December 2017 to become national senator.) | 2019 |
| Santa Cruz | | Antonio José Carambia | Frente para la Victoria-PJ] | 2017 | 2021 |
| Santa Cruz | | Máximo Carlos Kirchner | Frente para la Victoria-PJ | 2015 | 2019 |
| Santa Cruz | | Roxana Nahir Reyes | Unión Cívica Radical | 2017 | 2021 |
| Santa Cruz | | Héctor Alberto Roquel | Unión Cívica Radical | 2015 | 2019 |
| Santa Cruz | | Juan Benedicto Vázquez | Frente para la Victoria-PJ | 2017 (Note: Since 18 December 2017.) | 2021 |
| Santa Fe | | Albor Ángel "Nicky" Cantard | Unión Cívica Radical | 2017 | 2021 |
| Santa Fe | | Marcos Cleri | Frente para la Victoria-PJ | 2015 | 2019 |
| Santa Fe | | Luis Gustavo Contigiani | Frente Progresista Cívico y Social | 2017 | 2021 |
| Santa Fe | | Lucila María de Ponti | Peronismo para la Victoria | 2015 | 2019 |
| Santa Fe | | Gonzalo Pedro Antonio del Cerro | Unión Cívica Radical | 2017 | 2021 |
| Santa Fe | | Silvina Patricia Frana | Frente para la Victoria-PJ | 2015 | 2019 |
| Santa Fe | | Josefina Victoria González | Frente para la Victoria-PJ | 2017 | 2021 |
| Santa Fe | | Alejandro Ariel Grandinetti | Federal Unidos por una Nueva Argentina | 2015 | 2019 |
| Santa Fe | | Astrid Hummel | Unión PRO | 2017 (Note: Since 18 December 2017. Replaced Ana Laura Martínez after she resigned on 9 December 2017 to become councilwoman of Rosario.) | 2019 |
| Santa Fe | | Lucas Ciriaco Incicco | Unión PRO | 2015 | 2019 |
| Santa Fe | | Luciano Andrés Laspina | Unión PRO | 2017 | 2021 |
| Santa Fe | | María Lucila Lehmann | Coalición Cívica | 2017 | 2021 |
| Santa Fe | | Hugo María Marcucci | Unión Cívica Radical | 2015 | 2019 |
| Santa Fe | | Vanesa Laura Massetani | Federal Unidos por una Nueva Argentina | 2015 | 2019 |
| Santa Fe | | José Carlos Núñez | Unión PRO | 2015 | 2019 |
| Santa Fe | | Alejandro Ramos | Primero Argentina | 2015 | 2019 |
| Santa Fe | | Alejandra Rodenas | Nuevo Espacio Santafesino | 2017 | 2021 |
| Santa Fe | | Agustín Oscar Rossi | Frente para la Victoria-PJ | 2017 | 2021 |
| Santa Fe | | Gisela Scaglia | Unión PRO | 2017 | 2021 |
| Santiago del Estero | | Norma Amanda Abdala de Matarazzo | Frente Cívico por Santiago | 2017 | 2021 |
| Santiago del Estero | | Hugo Orlando Infante | Frente Cívico por Santiago | 2017 | 2021 |
| Santiago del Estero | | Claudia Alejandra Ledesma Abdala de Zamora | Frente Cívico por Santiago | 2017 | 2021 |
| Santiago del Estero | | Mariana Elizabet Morales | Federal Unidos por una Nueva Argentina | 2015 | 2019 |
| Santiago del Estero | | Graciela Navarro | Frente Cívico por Santiago | 2015 | 2019 |
| Santiago del Estero | | Estela Mary Neder | Frente Cívico por Santiago | 2017 (Note: Since 22 November 2017. Replaced José Alberto Herrera after he resigned on 15 November 2017 to become mayor of Clodomira.) | 2019 |
| Santiago del Estero | | Mirta Ameliana Pastoriza | Frente Cívico por Santiago | 2015 | 2019 |
| Tierra del Fuego | | Analuz Ailen Carol | Frente para la Victoria-PJ | 2015 | 2019 |
| Tierra del Fuego | | Martín Alejandro Pérez | Frente para la Victoria-PJ | 2017 | 2021 |
| Tierra del Fuego | | Matías David Rodríguez | Frente para la Victoria-PJ | 2015 | 2019 |
| Tierra del Fuego | | Carlos Gastón Roma | Unión PRO | 2015 | 2019 |
| Tierra del Fuego | | Héctor Antonio Stefani | Unión PRO | 2017 | 2021 |
| Tucumán | | Beatriz Luisa Ávila | Frente para la Victoria-PJ | 2017 | 2021 |
| Tucumán | | José Manuel Cano | Unión Cívica Radical | 2017 | 2021 |
| Tucumán | | Facundo Garretón | Unión PRO | 2015 | 2019 |
| Tucumán | | Medina Gladys | Justicialista por Tucumán | 2017 | 2021 |
| Tucumán | | José Fernando Orellana | Justicialista por Tucumán | 2015 | 2019 |
| Tucumán | | Walter Marcelo Santillan | Frente para la Victoria-PJ | 2015 | 2019 |
| Tucumán | | Mirta Alicia Soraire | Frente para la Victoria-PJ | 2015 | 2019 |
| Tucumán | | María Teresita Villavicencio | Evolución Radical | 2015 | 2019 |
| Tucumán | | Pablo Raúl Yedlin | Justicialista por Tucumán | 2017 | 2021 |
