= Martín Llaryora =

Argentine politician (born 1972)

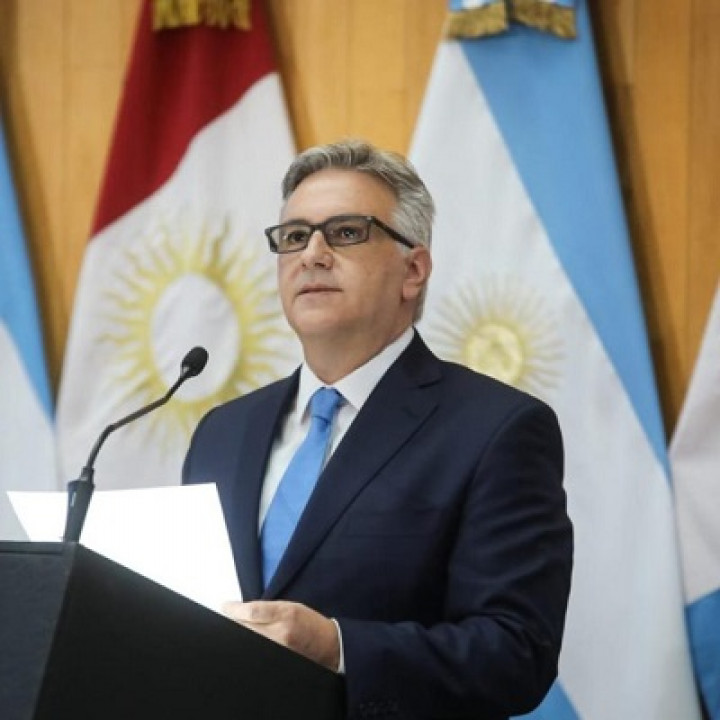

Governor of Córdoba
- Incumbent
- Assumed office 10 December 2023
- Vice Governor: Myrian Prunotto
- Preceded by: Juan Schiaretti

Mayor of Córdoba
- In office 10 December 2019 – 10 December 2023
- Preceded by: Ramón Javier Mestre
- Succeeded by: Daniel Passerini

National Deputy
- In office 10 December 2017 – 10 December 2019
- Succeeded by: Claudia Márquez
- Constituency: Córdoba

Vice Governor of Córdoba
- In office 10 December 2015 – 10 December 2017
- Governor: Juan Schiaretti
- Preceded by: Alicia Pregno
- Succeeded by: Manuel Calvo

Mayor of San Francisco
- In office 29 December 2014 – 10 December 2015
- Preceded by: Ignacio García Aresca
- Succeeded by: Ignacio García Aresca
- In office 10 December 2007 – 10 December 2013
- Preceded by: Hugo César Madonna
- Succeeded by: Ignacio García Aresca

Personal details
- Born: 6 October 1972 (age 54) San Francisco, Córdoba, Argentina
- Party: Justicialist Party
- Other political affiliations: Union for Córdoba (2009–2019); We Do for Córdoba (2019–present)
- Spouse: Marcela Beccaría
- Education: National University of Córdoba

Martín Miguel Llaryora (Spanish: [maɾˈtin ʃaɾˈʃoɾa], born 6 October 1972) is an Argentine politician who has been Governor of Córdoba Province since 2023.

A member of the Justicialist Party's dissident wing and close ally of Juan Schiaretti, Llaryora served as intendente (mayor) of the City of Córdoba from 2019 to 2023 and as a National Deputy for Córdoba from 2017 to 2019. Prior to that, he also served as Vice Governor under Schiaretti from 2015 to 2017.

== Early life and education ==
Llaryora was born on 6 October 1972 in San Francisco, Córdoba, to Luis Alberto Llaryora and María del Carmen Seijo. He attended finished high school at IPEM 50 “Emilio F. Olmos”, where he began his political involvement at the school's students' union. In 2002 he completed a diplom on Public Administration at the Catholic University of Córdoba, and in 2009 he attained a law degree from the National University of Córdoba.

== Political career ==
=== San Francisco ===
In 2003 he was elected to the City Council of San Francisco, Córdoba in the Justicialist Party ticket. Four years later, he was elected intendente (mayor) of San Francisco with 33% of the votes against the Radical Civic Union incumbent, Hugo Madonna.

In 2011 he was elected president of the San Francisco chapter of the Justicialist Party. In July of that year, he was re-elected as mayor with 52.76% of the votes, the highest percentage in a mayoral election in the city since 1983.

=== Provincial government ===
On 11 December 2013 he was appointed by Governor José Manuel de la Sota as Minister of Industry of Córdoba Province, a position he would hold until 2014. During his time in office, Llaryora proposed a number of bills to promote industrial development and boost small businesses in the province.

In the 2015 provincial election, Llaryora ran for vice governor in the Union for Córdoba list alongside Juan Schiaretti. The Schiaretti–Llaryora ticket won with 39% of the votes against the Together for Córdoba ticket of Oscar Aguad and Héctor Baldassi.

=== National Deputy ===
Ahead of the 2017 general election, Llaryora was announced as the first candidate in the Union for Córdoba list to the Argentine Chamber of Deputies. With 626,887 votes (48.48%), the UpC list came second, but with enough votes for Llaryora to make it past the D'Hondt cut and be elected. As a national deputy, Llaryora formed part of the parliamentary commission on foreign affairs and worship.

In 2017, he voted in favour of President Mauricio Macri's flagship pension reform. He was also selected by his peers as alternate member of the Council of Magistracy in representation of the lower house of Congress. In 2018, he voted against the Voluntary Interruption of Pregnancy Bill, which would have legalised abortion in Argentina.

=== Mayor of Córdoba ===
In 2019 he ran for intendente (mayor) of the City of Córdoba. During the campaign, he refused to participate in televised debates, brushing them off as "aggressive shows".

Among his campaign proposals, Llaryora introduced a proposal for a "metropolitan railway" that would operate within city limits. He also proposed renovating the existing parks and green areas and creating five new parks in the city: the Centro Cívico park, Parque del Este, Parque del Oeste, Parque Fadea, and a park in front of Estadio Mario Alberto Kempes. Llaryora also proposed a "Connectivity Plan", which would involve the construction of 102 kilometers of new optical fiber and the establishment of new free Wi-Fi zones in parks, squares, and municipal public buildings. Security-wise, he proposed the creation of "Citizen Security Councils", where the municipality would work in coordination with residents and the provincial government.

On 12 May 2019, he won the election with 37% of the votes, becoming the first mayor of Córdoba from the Justicialist Party to be elected since the 1970s. Luis Juez came in second place with 20% of the votes.

In late December 2019, he introduced an economic emergency ordinance bill to the Deliberative Council. The bill allowed the municipality to restructure financial obligations, rationalize public spending, sell movable and immovable property, and increase the property tax by 53%.

In January 2020, a joint plan with the provincial government was announced to restore Parque Sarmiento. By July 2020, the municipality intervened in the city zoo to transform it into the Biodiversity Park, focusing on species conservation, combating illegal pet trafficking and animal trade, and providing refuge for endangered wildlife.

The metropolitan train began operating in December 2021, with five daily trips between Córdoba and La Calera. However, by 2023, the train had not yet become a widely used transportation alternative.

=== Governor of Córdoba ===
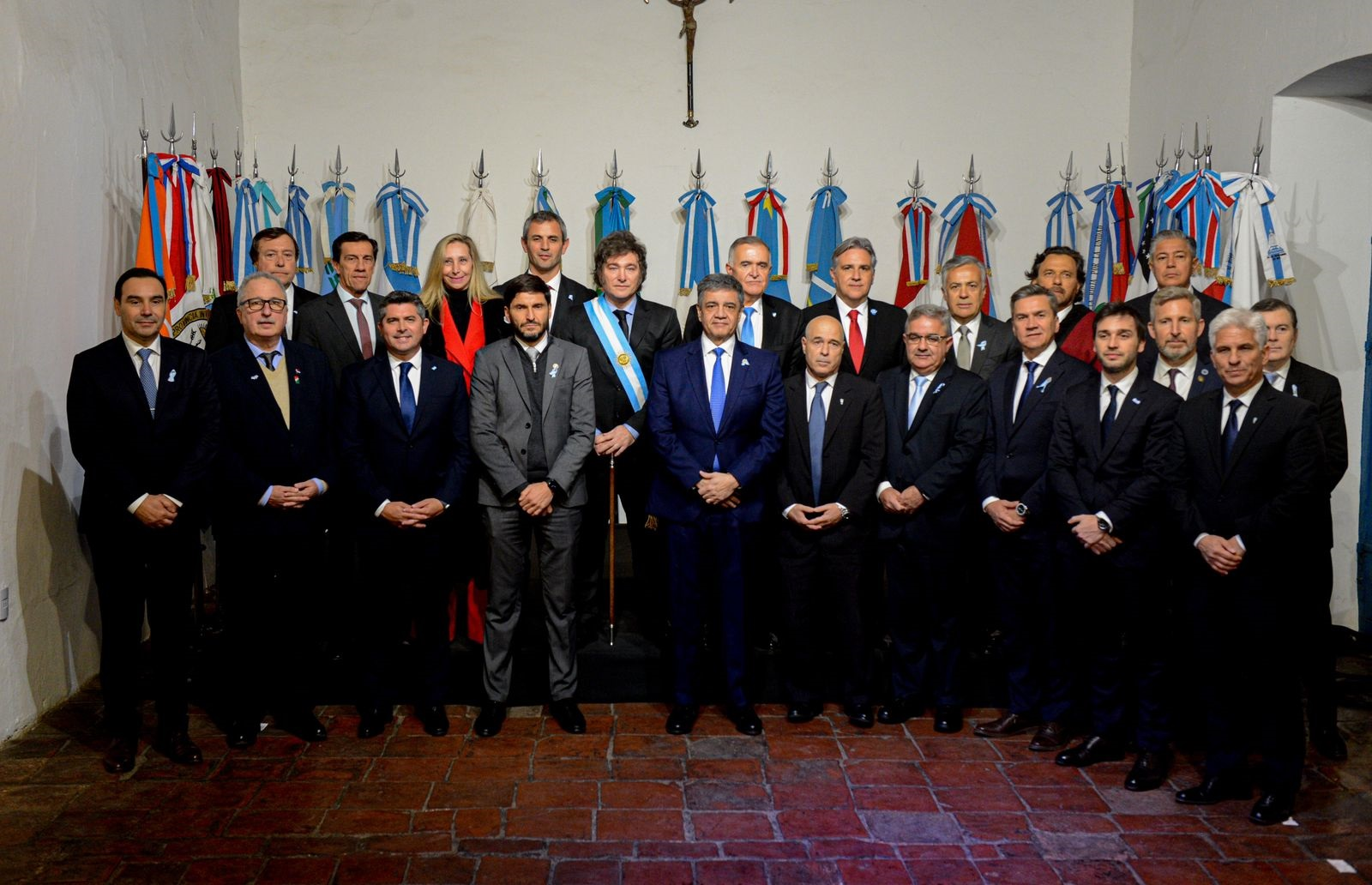
Llaryora alongside the governors of 18 other provinces and President Javier Milei during the signing of the May 25th Pact.

Llaryora ran for governor of Córdoba in the 2023 provincial elections. As the We Do for Córdoba candidate, he was elected with 870,935 votes (45.20%), defeating Luis Juez of Juntos por el Cambio, who received 806,541 votes (41.86%).

The first measures announced during his inauguration on December 10 were related to public spending cuts: reducing the number of ministries, freezing public sector vacancies (except in health, education, and security), and lowering public officials' salaries. Regarding security, he announced plans to double anti-narcotics prosecutor's offices and proposed legislation to establish a Municipal Police force.

As governor, Llaryora positioned himself as an ally of President Javier Milei and was one of the governors who signed the May 25th Pact. In July 2025 he was elected as president of the Córdoba Justicialist Party.

== Personal life ==
Llaryora has been married twice and has three children: Francisco, Facundo and Victoria.

== Electoral history ==
=== Executive ===
Electoral history of Martín Llaryora
| Election | Office | List | Votes | | | Result | Ref. |
| Election | Office | List | Total | % | P. | Result | Ref. |
|---|---|---|---|---|---|---|---|
| 2007 | Mayor of San Francisco | Justicialist Party | | 33% | 1st | Elected | |
| 2011 | Mayor of San Francisco | Union for Córdoba | | 52.76% | 1st | Elected | |
| 2015 | Vice Governor of Córdoba | Union for Córdoba | 745,240 | 39.99% | 1st | Elected | |
| 2019 | Mayor of Córdoba | We Do for Córdoba | 281,366 | 40.20% | 1st | Elected | |
| 2023 | Governor of Córdoba | We Do for Córdoba | 870,935 | 45.20% | 1st | Elected | |

=== Legislative ===
Electoral history of Martín Llaryora
| Election | Office | List | # | District | Votes | | | Result | Ref. |
| Election | Office | List | # | District | Total | % | P. | Result | Ref. |
|---|---|---|---|---|---|---|---|---|---|
| 2017 | National Deputy | Union for Córdoba | 1 | Córdoba | 626,887 | 30.48% | 2nd (Note: Presented on an electoral list. The data shown represents the share of the vote the entire party/alliance received in that constituency.) | Elected | |

Political offices
| Preceded by Hugo Madonna | Mayor of San Francisco; 2007–2013 | Succeeded by Ignacio García Aresca |
| Preceded by Ignacio García Aresca | Mayor of San Francisco; 2014–2015 | Succeeded by Ignacio García Aresca |
| Preceded by Ramón Javier Mestre | Mayor of Córdoba; 2019–2023 | Succeeded by Daniel Passerini |
| Preceded by Juan Schiaretti | Governor of Córdoba; 2023–present | Incumbent |
