= Carlos Gutiérrez (Argentine politician) =

Argentine politician

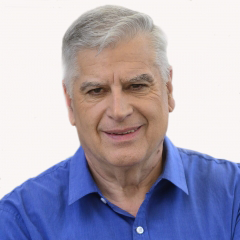

National Deputy
- Incumbent
- Assumed office 10 December 2019
- Constituency: Córdoba

Provincial Legislator of Córdoba
- In office 10 December 2015 – 10 December 2019
- Constituency: Provincial List

Minister of Agriculture, Livestock and Food of Córdoba
- In office 10 December 2007 – 10 December 2011
- Governor: Juan Schiaretti
- Succeeded by: Néstor Escalerandi

Personal details
- Born: 27 October 1953 (age 72) Río Cuarto, Argentina
- Party: Justicialist Party
- Other political affiliations: Union for Córdoba (until 2019); We Do for Córdoba (since 2019)

Carlos Mario Gutiérrez (born 27 October 1953) is an Argentine politician, currently serving as National Deputy representing Córdoba Province since 2019. A member of the Justicialist Party, Gutiérrez forms part of the provincial Hacemos por Córdoba (HPC) alliance and presides over the Federal Córdoba bloc in the Chamber of Deputies.

== Political career ==
Gutiérrez was a councilman in his hometown of Río Cuarto before serving as Minister of Agriculture, Livestock and Food of Córdoba under Governor Juan Schiaretti from 2007 to 2011. From 2015 to 2019, Gutiérrez was a member of the Legislature of Córdoba for the Union for Córdoba alliance.

Gutiérrez ran for a seat in the lower house of the National Congress in the 2019 legislative election, as the first candidate in the Hacemos por Córdoba list. The list was the third-most voted in the province, with 16.95% of the vote, and Gutiérrez was elected.

As a national deputy, Gutiérrez formed part of the parliamentary commissions on Regional Economies and Development (which he presides) and Public Works. Gutiérrez was an opponent of the legalization of abortion in Argentina, voting against the 2020 Voluntary Interruption of Pregnancy bill, which passed the Chamber and later went on to legalize abortion nationwide.

In September 2020, he confirmed he had tested positive for COVID-19.
