= Carlos Alberto Caserio =

Argentine politician (born 1950)

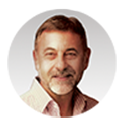

Vice President of the Banco de la Nación Argentina
- In office 31 March 2022 – 10 December 2023
- President: Silvina Batakis
- Preceded by: Matías Tombolini
- Succeeded by: Darío Wasserman

National Senator
- In office 10 December 2015 – 10 December 2021
- Constituency: Córdoba

National Deputy
- In office 10 December 2013 – 10 December 2015
- Constituency: Córdoba
- In office 10 December 2003 – 10 December 2007
- Constituency: Córdoba

Minister of Government of Córdoba
- In office 10 December 2007 – 10 December 2011
- Governor: Juan Schiaretti
- Preceded by: Eduardo Accastello
- Succeeded by: Oscar González

Minister of Public Works of Córdoba
- In office 10 December 1999 – 10 December 2003
- Governor: José Manuel de la Sota
- Succeeded by: Oscar Santarelli

Personal details
- Born: 25 May 1950 (age 75) Buenos Aires, Argentina
- Party: Justicialist Party
- Other political affiliations: Union for Córdoba (1998–2019); Frente de Todos (since 2019)

Carlos Alberto Caserio (born 25 May 1950) is an Argentine politician, who was a National Senator for Córdoba Province from 2015 to 2021 and a National Deputy from 2013 to 2015. A member of the Justicialist Party, Caserio formed part of the Union for Córdoba regional alliance from 1998 to 2019. In the Senate, he sat with the Frente de Todos parliamentary bloc from 2019 to 2021.

Caserio served in a number of posts in the Córdoba provincial government under José Manuel de la Sota and Juan Schiaretti.

== Early and personal life ==
Caserio was born on 25 May 1950 in Buenos Aires. He began his political activism in the Peronist Left, and in 1978, he moved with his family to Valle Hermoso, a small town in the Punilla Department of Córdoba Province.

He is married to Alicia Narducci and has two children, Mariana and Hernán. His brother, Jorge Caserio, is also active in politics and served as mayor of Valle Hermoso.

== Political career ==
During the 1990s, Caserio was director of the Rio II petrochemical plant and director of the National Administration of Health Insurance, and was elected to the provincial senate of Córdoba Province before its disestablishment with the adoption of a new provincial constitution. From 1998 to 1999, he was undersecretary of commerce and food in the Ministry of Agriculture, during the presidency of Carlos Menem.

In 1999, following the election of José Manuel de la Sota as governor of Córdoba, Caserio was appointed minister of public works. He held the position until 2003. In the 2003 legislative election, he was elected to the Argentine Chamber of Deputies on the Union for Córdoba list. In 2007, following the end of his mandate as deputy, Caserio was appointed Minister of Government of Córdoba by governor Juan Schiaretti, serving until 2011.

=== National Senator ===
In the 2015 general election, Caserio was the first Union for Córdoba candidate to the National Senate. With 21.11% of the vote, the Union for Córdoba list was the second-most voted alliance in the province, granting Caserio the seat for the minority as per the limited voting system used for the Argentine upper house. He was sworn in on 3 December 2015.

While he originally remained in a single-member bloc (nominally representing Union for Córdoba), following the 2017 legislative election Caserio joined the Argentina Federal bloc led by Miguel Ángel Pichetto. Following the 2019 general election, most sectors of the peronist movement unified into the Frente de Todos, of which Caserio formed part. Caserio resigned from his post as president of the Córdoba Justicialist Party over disagreements with governor Schiaretti regarding the Frente de Todos and the decision by the Córdoba PJ to remain outside it.

As senator, Caserio formed part of the parliamentary commissions on Agriculture, National Defense, Regional Economies and Small Businesses, Tourism, Population and Human Development, and Internal Security, and he presided the commission on Budgets and Finances. He was a supporter of the legalization of abortion in Argentina, voting in favour the two Voluntary Interruption of Pregnancy bill debated by the Argentine Congress in 2018 and 2020.

Caserio stood for re-election in 2021 as the first candidate in the Frente de Todos list, alongside deputy Gabriela Estévez. The Frente de Todos list received merely 10.47% of the votes, and landed third, losing the seat for the minority. Caserio's term expired on 10 December 2021.

=== Vice-President of the Bank of the Argentine Nation ===
Caserio was designated Vice-president of the Banco de la Nación Argentina on 31 March 2022 by President Alberto Fernández in replacement of the previous Vice-president Matías Tombolini.
