= Ignacio García Aresca =

Argentinian politician

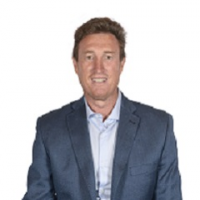

National Deputy
- Incumbent
- Assumed office 10 December 2021
- Constituency: Córdoba

Mayor of San Francisco
- In office 10 December 2015 – 10 December 2021
- Preceded by: Martín Llaryora
- Succeeded by: Damián Javier Bernarte
- In office 10 December 2013 – 29 December 2014
- Preceded by: Martín Llaryora
- Succeeded by: Martín Llaryora

Personal details
- Born: 24 August 1969 (age 57)
- Party: Justicialist Party
- Other political affiliations: Union for Córdoba (until 2019); We Do for Córdoba (since 2019); Hacemos Federal Coalition (since 2023)
- Education: Argentine University of Enterprise

Ignacio García Aresca (born 24 August 1969) is an Argentine politician currently serving as a National Deputy elected in Córdoba Province since 2021. A member of the Justicialist Party, García Aresca served twice as intendente (mayor) of San Francisco from 2013 to 2021.

== Biography ==
García Aresca counts with a degree on business administration from the Argentine University of Enterprise (UADE). In 2021 he was elected to the Chamber of Deputies on the Hacemos por Nuestro País list.

Political offices
Preceded by Martín Llaryora	Mayor of San Francisco; 2013–2014	Succeeded by Martín Llaryora
Preceded by Martín Llaryora	Mayor of San Francisco; 2015–2021	Succeeded by Damián Bernarte
