= Alliance-Union (disambiguation) =

Alliance-Union may refer to:

- The Alliance–Union universe of science fiction and fantasy writer C. J. Cherryh
- Popular Alliance – UDEUR, a political party in Italy
- Alliance Union of Cordoba, a provincial political party in Argentina
