= Claudia Márquez =

Argentine politician (born 1969)

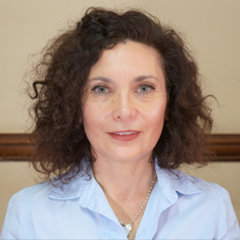

National Deputy
- In office 10 December 2019 – 9 December 2021
- Constituency: Córdoba

Personal details
- Born: 22 January 1969 (age 57) Córdoba, Argentina
- Party: Justicialist Party
- Other political affiliations: We Do for Córdoba
- Education: National University of Córdoba

Claudia Gabriela Márquez (born 22 January 1969) is an Argentine lawyer and politician who served as a National Deputy for Córdoba from 2019 to 2021. She assumed office on 10 December 2019, filling the vacancy left by Martín Llaryora.

== Electoral history ==
Electoral history of Claudia Márquez
| Election | Office | List | # | District | Votes | | | Result | Ref. |
| Election | Office | List | # | District | Total | % | P. | Result | Ref. |
|---|---|---|---|---|---|---|---|---|---|
| 2017 | National Deputy | Union for Córdoba | 5 | Córdoba | 626,887 | 30.48% | 2nd (Note: Presented on an electoral list. The data shown represents the share of the vote the entire party/alliance received in that constituency.) | Not elected (Note: Assumed office on 19 December 2019 following the resignation of Martín Llaryora.) | |

== See also ==
- List of Argentine deputies, 2019–2021
