= Roberto Salvarezza =

Argentine biochemist and politician

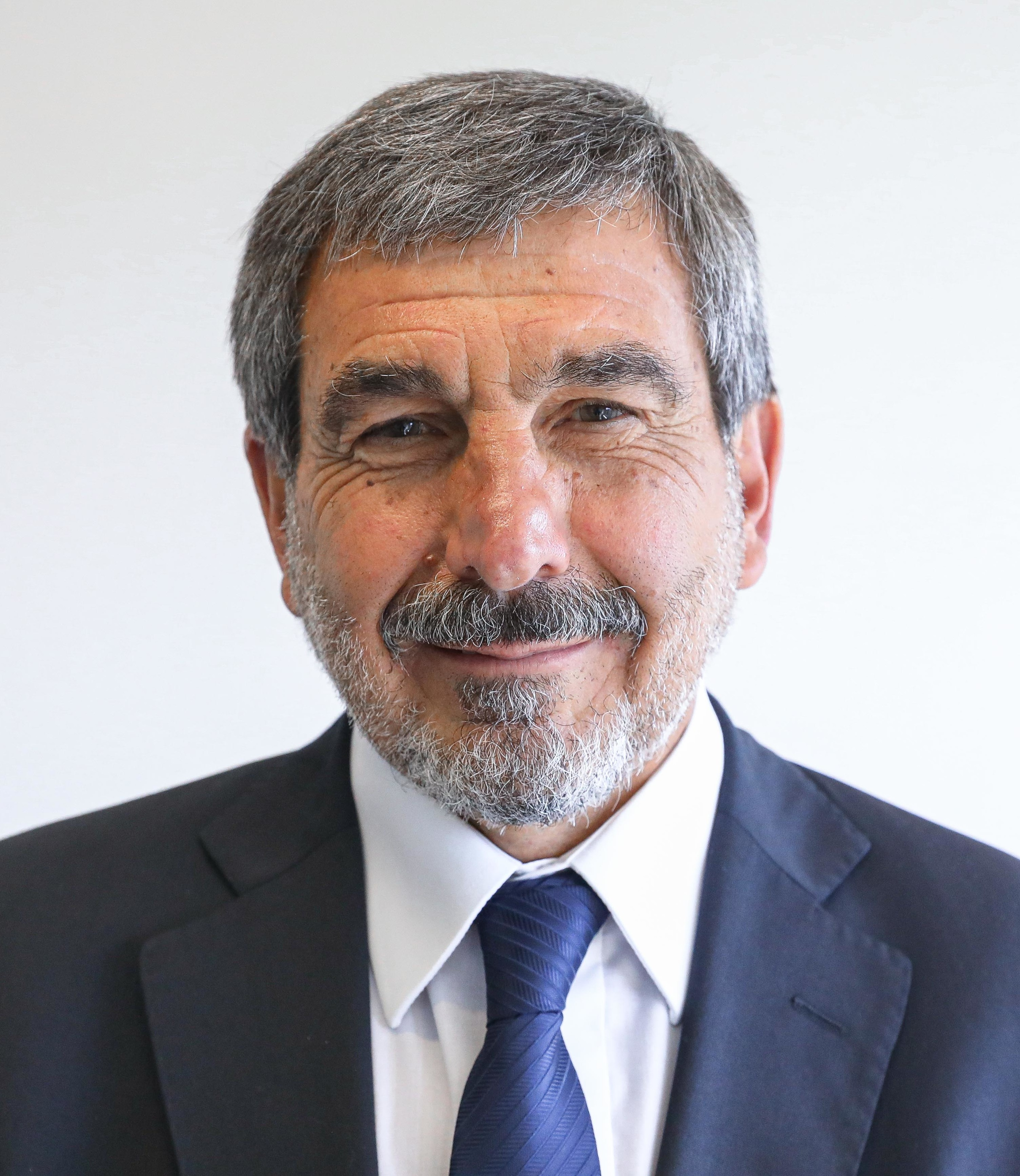

Minister of Science, Technology and Innovation
- In office 10 December 2019 – 20 September 2021
- President: Alberto Fernández
- Preceded by: Lino Barañao (as Secretary of Science)
- Succeeded by: Daniel Filmus

National Deputy
- In office 10 December 2017 – 10 December 2019
- Constituency: Buenos Aires

President of the National Scientific and Technical Research Council
- In office 7 May 2012 – 9 December 2015
- Preceded by: Marta Graciela Rovira
- Succeeded by: Alejandro Ceccatto

Personal details
- Born: 30 January 1952 (age 74) Lanús, Buenos Aires Province, Argentina
- Party: Independent
- Other political affiliations: Frente de Todos (since 2019); Front for Victory (until 2019)
- Education: University of Buenos Aires

Roberto Carlos Salvarezza (Spanish pronunciation: [roˈβeɾto ˈkaɾlos salβaˈɾesa]; born 30 January 1952) is an Argentine biochemist, researcher and politician. He was Argentina's Minister of Science, Technology and Innovation from 2019 to 2021, in the cabinet of President Alberto Fernández.

Salvarezza was president of the National Scientific and Technical Research Council (CONICET) from 2012 to 2015, and then served as a member of the Argentine Chamber of Deputies from 2015 to 2019 representing Buenos Aires Province, sitting in the Front for Victory bloc.

== Early life and education ==
Roberto Carlos Salvarezza was born on 30 January 1952 in Lanús Oeste, in the southern side of the Greater Buenos Aires conurbation in Buenos Aires Province. He attended high school at the prestigious Colegio Nacional de Buenos Aires, and later finished his biochemistry licenciatura at the University of Buenos Aires (UBA) in 1977. In 1981 he finished his PhD in the same university; his dissertation was titled "The microbiological corrosion of aluminium and alloys in water-combustion systems" (Spanish: "Corrosión microbiológica del aluminio y aleaciones en sistemas agua-combustible").

== Academic work ==
In the late 1980s he specialized his work on new scanning electron microscope technologies at the Autonomous University of Madrid; from then on his specialty was nanotechnology.

In 1992 he founded the Nanoscopy Laboratory of the Theoretical and Applied Physicochemical Research (Spanish: Instituto de Investigaciones Fisicoquímicas Teóricas y Aplicadas; INIFTA) at the National University of La Plata. He worked as director of said laboratory and also of the INIFTA. Throughout his career, Salvarezza has authored over 300 publications.

In April 2012 he was designated president of the National Scientific and Technical Research Council by then-Minister of Science Lino Barañao. Salvarezza resigned from the post in 2015 upon the ascension of Mauricio Macri to the presidency of Argentina, citing Macri's intended scientific policy as his main reason.

In July 2016, Salvarezza was elected representative of the Exact and Natural Sciences area in the CONICET directory, but his designation was not approved by the government in an unprecedented move. This caused controversy among the scientific community, wherein it was decried as "political discrimination". Salvarezza received the backing of the Directive Council of the UBA Faculty of Exact and Natural Sciences, the World Federation of Scientific Workers and the CyTa group.

== Political career ==
In June 2017 Salvarezza was selected to go second in the Citizen's Unity Chamber of Deputies candidates party list in Buenos Aires Province in the 2017 legislative election, following Fernanda Vallejos. The list received 37% of the votes, second to the Cambiemos list, but it secured enough votes for Salvarezza to be elected for the 2017–2021 term.

In December 2019, Salvarezza was appointed Minister of Science, Technology and Innovation by newly elected president Alberto Fernández, succeeding Barañao. The Ministry had been downgraded to a secretariat during the presidency of Mauricio Macri, but it was restored to its ministerial status with Salvarezza's appointment. He was replaced with Daniel Filmus on 20 September 2021 as part of a cabinet reshuffle, following the government's poor showings in the 2021 legislative primary elections.
