= Carlos Auyero =

Argentine politician

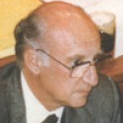

Leader of Christian Democratic Party (Argentina)

Personal details
- Born: 1936 Buenos Aires Province
- Died: 18 April 1997 (aged 60–61)
- Occupation: Politician

Carlos Auyero (1936 – 18 April 1997) was an Argentine politician. He was the leader of the Christian Democratic Party and played a major role in the formation of the centre-left coalition FrePaSo.

At 25 years old, Auyero was elected as a provincial deputy in Buenos Aires Province, having gained his doctorate in law. In 1973 he was elected as a national deputy. After the return of democracy in the 1980s he became leader of the Christian Democratic Party (PDC) and helped create the Frente Renovador with Peronists which saw Antonio Cafiero elected as governor of Buenos Aires Province and Auyero returned to the lower house of Congress in 1985.

Auyero was vice president of the Christian Democrat Organization of America (ODCA) and played a role in the Christian Democrat International.

Despite being the leader of the PDC, Auyero had opposed the party's 1989 alliance with Carlos Menem, which had been voted for narrowly by members, and Menem's pursuit of neo-liberal economic policies. He led his grouping, 'Humanism and Liberation', into a new party formed with activist Graciela Fernández Meijide, Popular Democracy, which then joined with dissident Peronists in the creation of the Broad Front.

Ahead of the 1995 elections, the Broad Front's leader Carlos Álvarez brought more opposition parties and social groups together into FrePaSo, the Front for a Country in Solidarity. FrePaSo's ticket for the Presidency in 1995 of José Octavio Bordón and Álvarez came second with 33% and established itself as a major force. In the same election, Auyero gained 20% of the vote for governor of Buenos Aires. He served as General Secretary of FrePaSo, which also included his old colleagues in the Christian Democrats.

On 17 April 1997, Auyero participated in the programme Hora Clave on Canal 9 presented by Mariano Grondona, appearing in a panel debate with government minister Eduardo Amadeo as well as journalist Néstor Ibarra and economist Enrique Szewach. Shortly after the programme, in which Auyero had debated forcefully with Amadeo, he collapsed with a heart attack. Auyero, who had a history of heart problems, died soon afterwards, at around midnight.
