= Lino Barañao =

Argentine chemist and politician

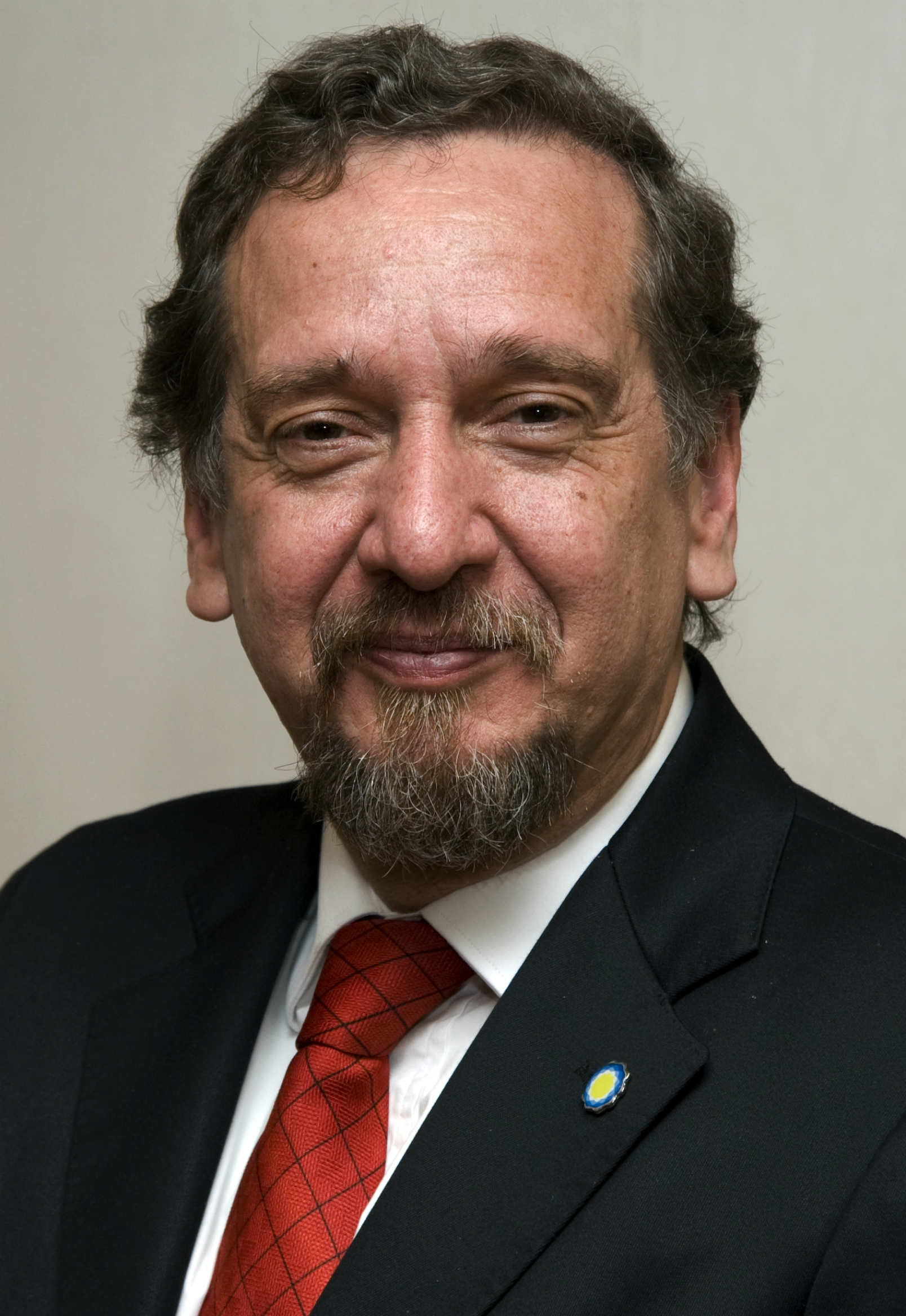

Minister of Science, Technology and Innovative Production
- In office December 10, 2007 – December 10, 2019
- President: Cristina Fernández de Kirchner; Mauricio Macri
- Preceded by: Position established
- Succeeded by: Roberto Salvarezza

Personal details
- Born: 28 December 1953 (age 72) Buenos Aires, Argentina
- Party: Independent
- Other political affiliations: Front for Victory (2007-2015)
- Education: University of Buenos Aires (BS, PhD); Max Planck Institute of Psychiatry; Penn State Milton S. Hershey Medical Center; CONICET

Lino Barañao (born 28 December 1953) is an Argentine chemist and politician. He was Minister of Science, Technology and Innovative Production of Argentina from 2007 to 2019, under Presidents Cristina Fernández de Kirchner and Mauricio Macri.

== Biography ==
Barañao was born in Buenos Aires and enrolled at the University of Buenos Aires (UBA) in 1973, where he graduated with high honors in 1976 with a degree in Chemistry. Specializing in biological chemistry, he earned a Doctorate at the University's School of Exact and Natural Sciences in 1980 and received the National Medical Academy's recognition for his research into hormonal roles in diabetes. Staying on as Professor from 1981, Barañao was subsequently given fellowships to the Max Planck Institute of Psychiatry in Munich and to the Milton S. Hershey Medical Center in Pennsylvania State University. A researcher in Argentina's CONICET specializing in reproductive biology from 1984 to 1994, he received the Bernardo Houssay Prize in 1987 and became part of the UBA's Exact Sciences School Board of Directors in 1990. He was named Vice President of the Argentine Biological Society in 1993 and served as its President in 1995-96.

== CONICET member ==
Becoming a member of CONICET's Advisory Board from 1999 to 2001, he continued research in the field of biotechnology and published 54 articles in international, peer-reviewed scientific journals and was named a fellow to the prestigious Endocrine Society, among others. Returning to the UBA as a leading Professor in his field, he was President of the National Agency for the Promotion of Science, Technology and Innovation and, on the creation of a cabinet-level Ministry by that name by outgoing President Néstor Kirchner in 2007, Barañao was named its first Minister on President Cristina Kirchner's inauguration on December 10, 2007.

With deep roots in veterinary science and agronomy, Barañao serves as a vital bridge between the administration and the agrarian sector.

== Honours and awards ==
He has won several awards, among them the Konex Award Special Mention in Science and Technology in 2013 for his last decade outstanding trajectory. In 2003 he won the Konex Award - Merit Diploma as one of 5 best biotechnologist in the last decade (1993-2002) in Argentina.
