= Ministry of Science, Technology and Innovation (Argentina) =

Former government ministry of Argentina

- Ministerio de Ciencia, Tecnología e Innovación
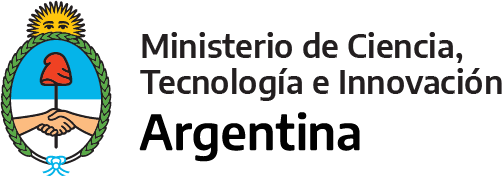

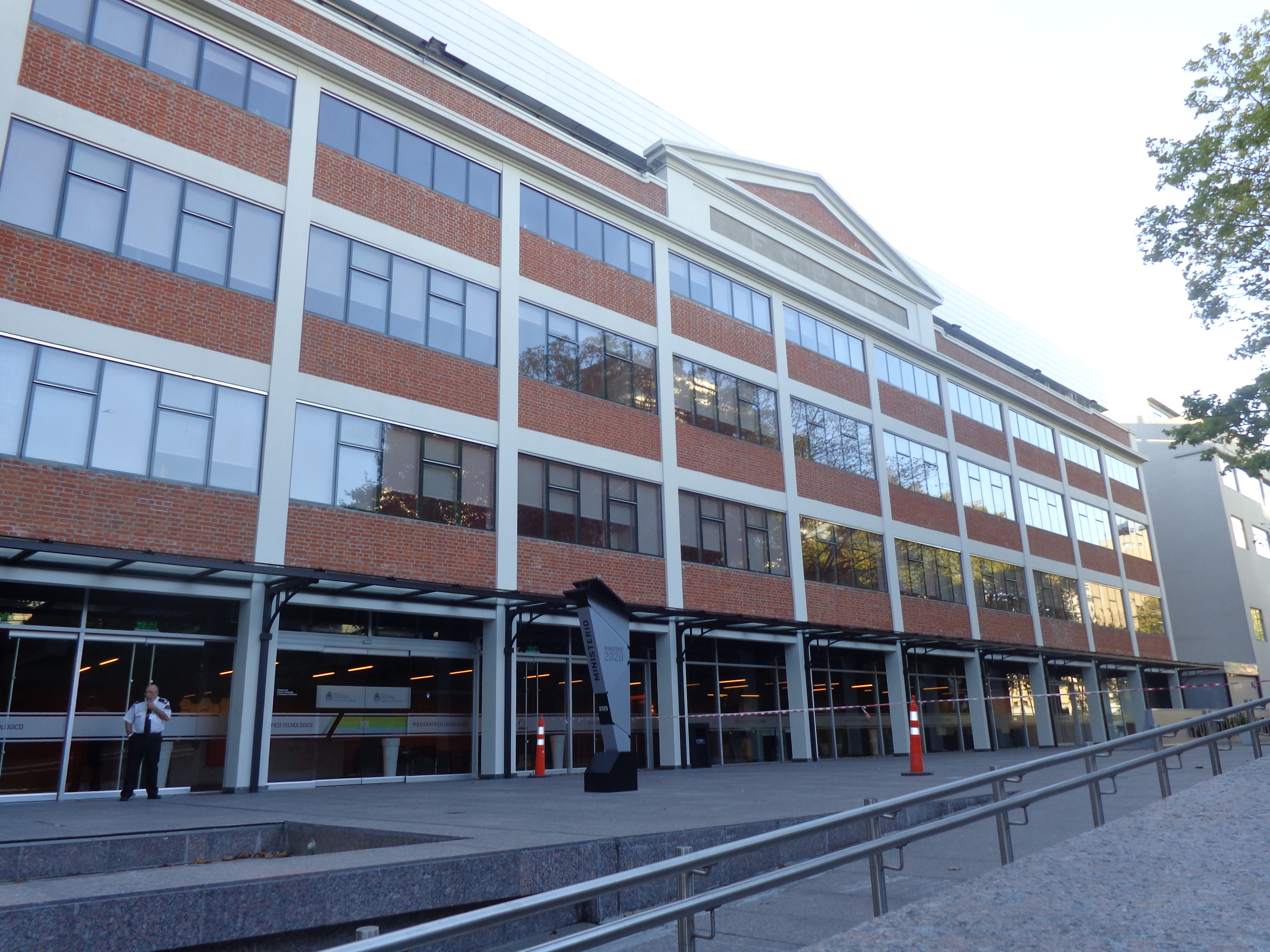

Ministry overview
- Formed: 2007; 19 years ago
- Preceding Ministry: Ministry of Education, Science, Technology and Innovation
- Dissolved: December 10, 2023; 2 years ago
- Jurisdiction: Government of Argentina
- Headquarters: Godoy Cruz 2320, Buenos Aires, Argentina
- Annual budget: $ 47,438,392 (2021)
- Minister responsible: Daniel Filmus
- Website: argentina.gob.ar/ciencia

Ministry of Science, Technology and Innovation (Spanish: Ministerio de Ciencia, Tecnología e Innovación; MINCYT) of Argentina was a ministry of the national executive power that oversaw the government's scientific and technological policy. It oversaw decentralized research and development dependencies such as the National Scientific and Technical Research Council (CONICET), the National Agency for the Promotion of Research, Technological Development and Innovation (Agencia I+D+i), the National Space Activities Commission (CONAE) and the National Genetic Data Bank.

The Ministry was created in 2007 by decree of then-President Cristina Fernández de Kirchner; matters of science and technological development had previously been part of the Ministry of Education's portfolio.

The ministry was dissolved on December 10, 2023 following a presidential decree from President Javier Milei.

== List of ministers ==
No.	Minister	Party	Term	President
Ministry of Science, Technology and Productive Innovation (2007–2018)
1	Lino Barañao	Independent	10 December 2007 – 10 December 2015	Cristina Fernández de Kirchner
1	Lino Barañao	Independent	10 December 2015 – 5 September 2018	Mauricio Macri
Ministry of Science, Technology and Innovation (2019–2023)
2	Roberto Salvarezza	Independent	10 December 2019 – 20 September 2021	Alberto Fernández
3	Daniel Filmus	Justicialist Party	20 September 2021 – 10 December 2023	Alberto Fernández
