= Eduardo Mondino =

Argentine politician (born 1958)

Eduardo R. Mondino (born 3 May 1958) is an Argentine journalist and Justicialist Party politician. Until April 2009, he was the National Ombudsman of Argentina.

Mondino qualified in journalism at the Colegio Universitario de Periodismo Obispo Trejo y Sanabria in Córdoba. Following several years working in social communications in his province, he joined the state gas company in 1989. In 1992 he became secretary of state for social action, serving until 1993 when he failed in his bid to be a state senator for Córdoba Province and returned to academia at the University College of Journalism of Cordoba.

On 14 May 1995, Mondino was elected to the Argentine Chamber of Deputies, representing Córdoba Province at the head of the Justicialist Party list. He served as chair of the Education Committee and vice-chair of the Communications Committee. He led the passage of several laws on education and telecommunications.

In 1999, Mondino was unanimously approved by both houses of Congress to be the National Ombudsman and took office on 28 December 1999. In 2000 he was made a director of the International Ombudsman Institute and he was elected President of the Federación Iberoamericana de Ombudsman (FIO) for the period 2001-2003. In 2004 he was reappointed as National Ombudsman by two-thirds of both houses of Congress.

== Return to elected politics ==
On several occasions, Mondino made clear his intention to compete for the governorship of Córdoba following the end of his term as Ombudsman in December 2009, leaving him two years ahead of the 2011 elections.

In April 2009, Mondino announced his early resignation as Ombudsman in order to allow him to compete in the 28 June legislative elections for Senator for Córdoba. His candidacy is being promoted by governor Juan Schiaretti in opposition to the national Peronist leadership of President Cristina Fernández de Kirchner and Néstor Kirchner. Schiaretti had fallen out with the Kirchners during the 2008 Argentine government conflict with the agricultural sector, during which Mondino too had been a critic of the government's position.

Preceded by Jorge Luís Mairorano	National Ombudsman of Argentina; 1999–2009	Succeeded by vacant
