= Juan Fernando Brügge =

Argentine politician (born 1962)

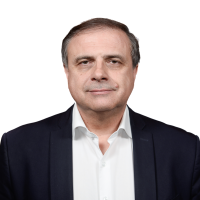

National Deputy
- Incumbent
- Assumed office 10 December 2023
- Constituency: Córdoba
- In office 1 March 2016 – 10 December 2019
- Constituency: Córdoba

Chairman of the Christian Democratic Party
- In office 19 December 2011 – 19 December 2015
- Preceded by: Carlos Lionel Traboulsi
- Succeeded by: Juan Carlos de la Peña

Provincial Legislator of Córdoba
- In office 10 December 2007 – 10 December 2011
- Constituency: Provincial List

Personal details
- Born: 24 June 1962 (age 64) Córdoba City, Argentina
- Party: Christian Democratic Party
- Other political affiliations: United for a New Alternative (2013–2015); Hacemos Federal Coalition (2023–present)
- Children: 2
- Education: National University of Córdoba
- Profession: Lawyer
- Website: www.juanbrugge.com.ar

Juan Fernando Brügge (born 24 June 1962) is an Argentine politician, vice president of the Christian Democratic Party of Argentina and National Deputy for Córdoba Province.

== Early years ==
Juan Fernando Brügge was born in the city of Córdoba, on June 24, 1962. His family, by father, is of German origin, from the small town of Werl, north of Germany, and by his mother is of French descent.

== Career path ==
Brügge attended Colegio Nacional de Monserrat before entering the National University of Córdoba. He graduated with a law degree in 1985.

Since 1987 he has been Professor of Constitutional Procedural Law at the National University of Córdoba.

From 1989 until 2014 was adjunct professor of the subject Constitutional Right in the Catholic University of Córdoba.

In 2007 he was elected to the Legislature of Córdoba.

From 30 April 2013 to 10 December 2015 Brügge served as one of the directors of the Bank of the province of Córdoba.

Afterwards Brügge was the chairman of the Christian Democratic Party (PDC) from 2011 to 2015.

And in 2015 he was elected to the Chamber of Deputies for his province, representing the centrist Christian Democratic Party, part of the United for a New Alternative political coalition.

Brügge chairs the commission of Communications and Information Technologyn of the Lower House.
