= Luis Contigiani =

Argentine politician (born 1972)

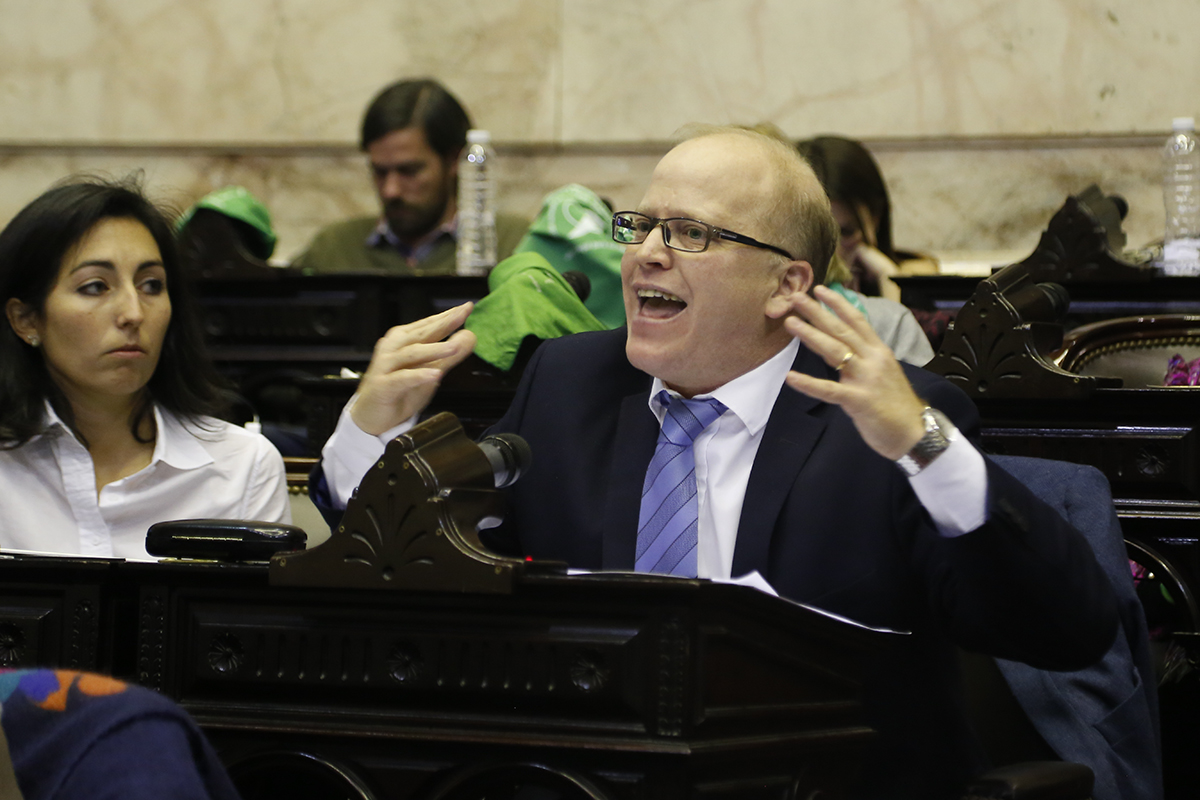

National Deputy
- In office 10 December 2017 – 10 December 2021
- Constituency: Santa Fe

Minister of Production of Santa Fe
- In office 11 December 2015 – 6 December 2017
- Governor: Miguel Lifschitz
- Preceded by: Carlos Fascendini
- Succeeded by: Alicia Ciciliani

Personal details
- Born: 21 January 1972 (age 54) Rosario, Argentina
- Party: Independent
- Other political affiliations: Progressive, Civic and Social Front (2011–2018); Socialist Party (2017–2018)

Luis Gustavo Contigiani (born 21 January 1972) is an Argentine politician who was a National Deputy elected in Santa Fe Province. Politically not affiliated to any party, Contigiani was elected on the Progressive, Civic and Social Front list in 2017, and for a time was the sole representative of the Socialist Party (PS) in the National Congress. The PS barred Contigiani from continuing to be the party's representative due to his opposition to the legalization of abortion in 2018.

Contigiani previously served as Minister of Production of Santa Fe from 2015 to 2017, during the governorship of Miguel Lifschitz, and as Secretary of Agriculture and Livestock of Santa Fe from 2011 to 2015, during the governorship of Antonio Bonfatti.

== Early and personal life ==
Contigiani was born on 21 January 1972 in Rosario, and grew up in the small town of Arequito. He finished high school at the Escuela de Enseñanza Media Nº 219 Domingo F. Sarmiento, and enrolled to study law at the National University of Rosario, but dropped out before completing his degree.

Contigiani is married to Valeria Mortarino and has three daughters.

== Political career ==
Contigiani was an advisor at the Legal and Technical Coordination cabinet of the Secretariat of Economic Development of Santa Fe, from 2001 to 2001, during the second governorship of Carlos Reutemann. Then, from 2002 to 2009, he was coordinator of the Labour Department of the Federación Agraria Argentina. In 2011, he was appointed Secretary of Agriculture and Livestock of the Ministry of Production of Santa Fe, under the supervision of Minister Carlos Fascendini. Later, upon the election of Miguel Lifschitz as governor of Santa Fe, Contigiani was appointed Minister of Production in his own right.

Contigiani ran for a seat in the Chamber of Deputies in the 2017 legislative election, as the first candidate in the Progressive, Civic and Social Front (FPCyS). The FPCyS was a coalition of the Socialist Party, the Radical Civic Union, and other smaller progressive parties. The FPCyS list received 14.63% of the vote, and Contigiani was the only candidate in it to be elected. Upon taking office, Contigiani formed the single-member Socialist Party parliamentary bloc.

As a national deputy, Contigiani formed part of the parliamentary commissions on Agriculture and Livestock, General Legislation, and National Defense. Controversially, Contigiani was a vocal opponent of the legalization of abortion in Argentina, which was first debated by Congress in 2018. Due to the Socialist Party's historic position on the issue, his opposition to the measure caused prominent Socialist Party members and leaders to call on Contigiani to resign from his seat, or at least stop nominally representing the party. He would eventually change the name of his bloc in order to vote against the Voluntary Interruption of Pregnancy Bill. Contigiani also voted against legalizing abortion in 2020, when it was approved by both chambers of Congress and signed into law by President Alberto Fernández.

Contigiani led the single-member "Progressive, Civic and Social Front" bloc for the remainder of his 2017–2021 term, though he no longer belonged to the alliance. Ahead of the 2021 primary elections, Contigiani announced he would be running for re-election as part of the "Diferentes" list within the Primero Santa Fe front. Although his list received enough votes in the primaries to make it to the general election, Contigiani resigned from his candidacy in October 2021 following disagreements over campaign strategies with his list mates. No longer in the race for re-election, Contigiani's term as a member of Congress expired on 10 December 2021.
