= Gabriela Estévez =

Argentine politician (born 1978)

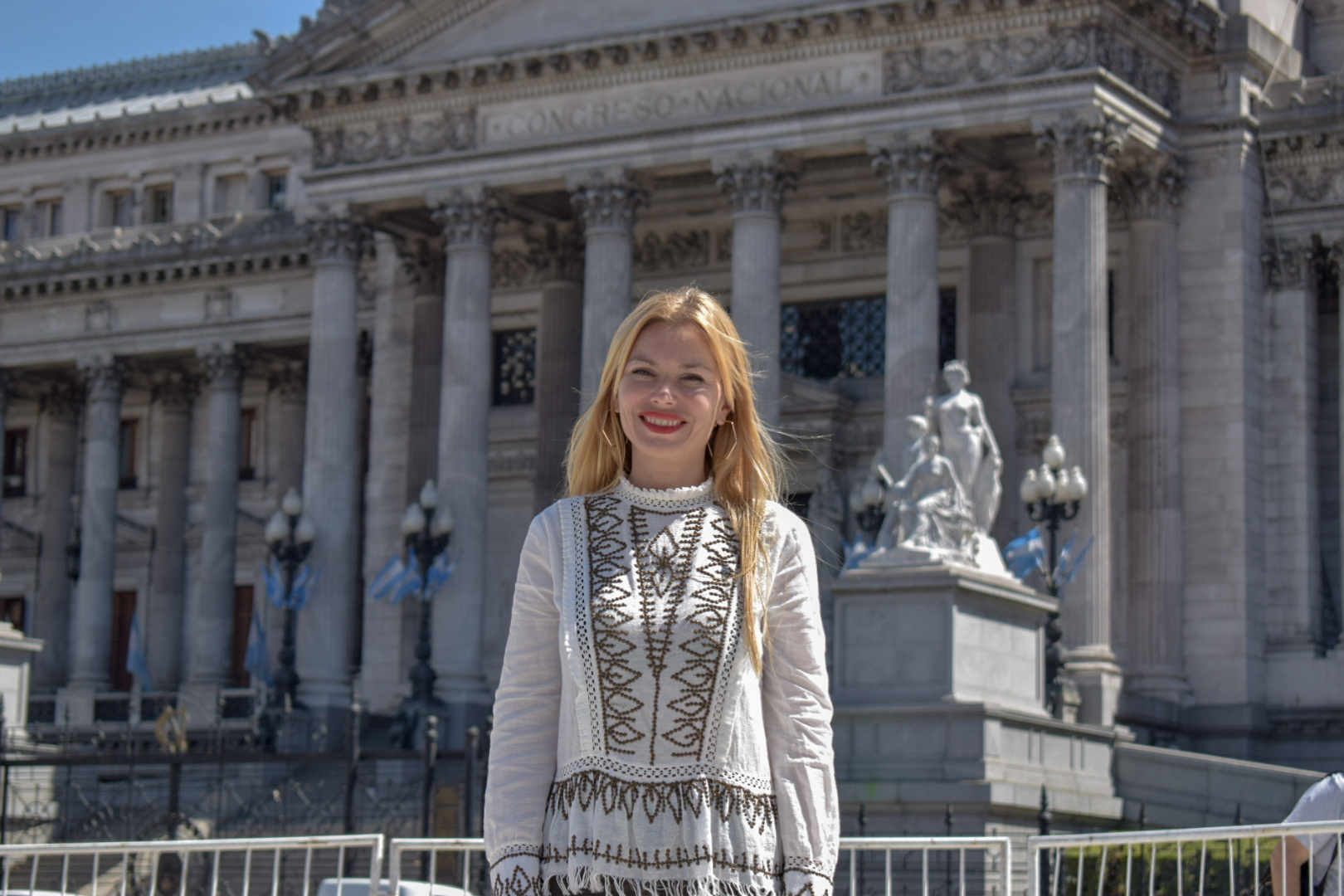

National Deputy
- Incumbent
- Assumed office 10 December 2015
- Constituency: Córdoba

Personal details
- Born: 11 February 1978 (age 48) Buenos Aires, Argentina
- Party: Justicialist Party
- Other political affiliations: Front for Victory (2008–2017); Unidad Ciudadana (2017–2019); Frente de Todos (2019–present)
- Education: Open University of Catalonia

Gabriela Beatriz Estévez (born 11 February 1978) is an Argentine politician, currently serving as National Deputy representing Córdoba. A member of the Justicialist Party, Estévez was first elected in 2015 for the Front for Victory, and was re-elected in 2019 as part of the Frente de Todos. She is a member of La Cámpora.

== Early life and education ==
Estévez was born on 11 February 1978 in Buenos Aires, to a family of Galician immigrants who had originally settled in Corrientes. She studied psychology at the Open University of Catalonia, graduating in 2008, and has a degree in Intra-family violence and Gender from Universidad Siglo XXI and a degree on social security from the International Social Security Association (ISSA).

== Political career ==
Estévez was appointed advisor of the Executive Board of the Córdoba Women's Provincial Council in 2008, a position she held until 2010. From then, she was regional chief of the provincial branch of ANSES, from 2012 to 2015. She is a member of La Cámpora.

Estévez ran for a seat in the Argentine Chamber of Deputies in the 2015 general election; she was the first candidate in the Front for Victory list in Córdoba Province, ahead of Juan Manuel Pereyra. The Front for Victory list received 18.10% of the votes, and both Estévez and Pereyra were elected. She was sworn in on 10 December 2015.

As a national deputy, Estévez was a vocal supporter of the legalization of abortion in Argentina. She voted in favor of the two Voluntary Interruption of Pregnancy bills that were debated by the Argentine Congress in 2018 and 2020. She has also been a supporter of the expansion of LGBT rights, having authored and introduced the 2021 bill on travesti and trans labour quota, which was approved by Congress.

Ahead of the 2021 primary elections, she was confirmed as the second Frente de Todos candidate to the Argentine Senate in Córdoba Province, behind Senator Carlos Caserio.

== Electoral history ==
Electoral history of Gabriela Estévez
Election	Office	List	#	District	Votes			Result	Ref.
Election	Office	List	#	District	Total	%	P.	Result	Ref.
2015	National Deputy	Front for Victory	1	Córdoba Province	385,387	18.10%	3rd (Note: Presented on an electoral list. The data shown represents the share of the vote the entire party/alliance received in that constituency.)	Elected	
2019	National Deputy	Frente de Todos	2	Córdoba Province	495,823	22.31%	2nd	Elected	
2023	National Deputy	Union for the Homeland	1	Córdoba Province	286,615	12.59%	4th	Elected	
