= May 25th Pact =

2024 political pact in Argentina

May Pact
May 25th Pact
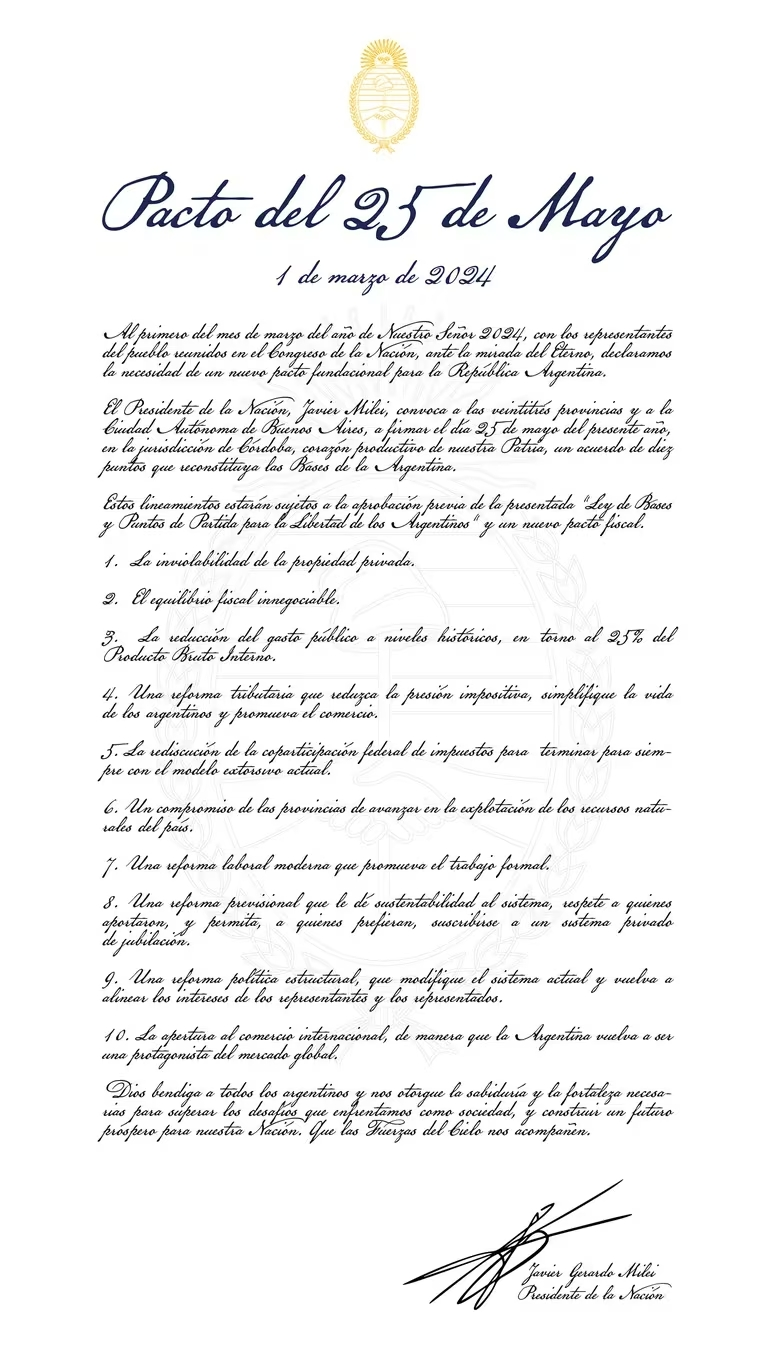
- Text of the May Pact
- Signed: September 7, 2024
- Location: Casa de Tucumán, Argentina
- Language: Rioplatense Spanish

The May 25th Pact (in Spanish Pacto del 25 de Mayo), commonly known as the Pacto de Mayo, is a pact proposed by Argentina's President, Javier Milei, to the governors of the 23 Provinces of Argentina as well as to the head of government of the capital, Buenos Aires. It is based on 10 outline points proposed by the government.

== Details ==
On March 1, 2024, Milei announced the Pact during the opening of the 142° ordinary session of the National Congress. The ten points are:

1. The defense of private property
2. Balanced budget
3. Reduction of public spending
4. Tax reform
5. Renegotiation of federal tax sharing
6. Provinces will exploit natural resources
7. Labor reform to promote formal labor
8. A provisional reform of pensions
9. Political reform
10. Free trade

The Pact was postponed due to issues with the Law of Bases and Starting Points for the Freedom of Argentines and the fiscal packet in the Plenary Commission of the Argentine Senate. In spite of the pact not being signed by the agreed date (chosen after the May Revolution), it kept the same name. After the approval of the Law of Bases and Starting Points for the Freedom of Argentines and the fiscal packet, on June 20, during the Argentinian Flag Day in Rosario, Milei renewed the invitation to the governors on July 9 in the Casa de Tucumán. During the 208° anniversary of the original Argentinian Independence Declaration, the Pact was signed by the attending governors.

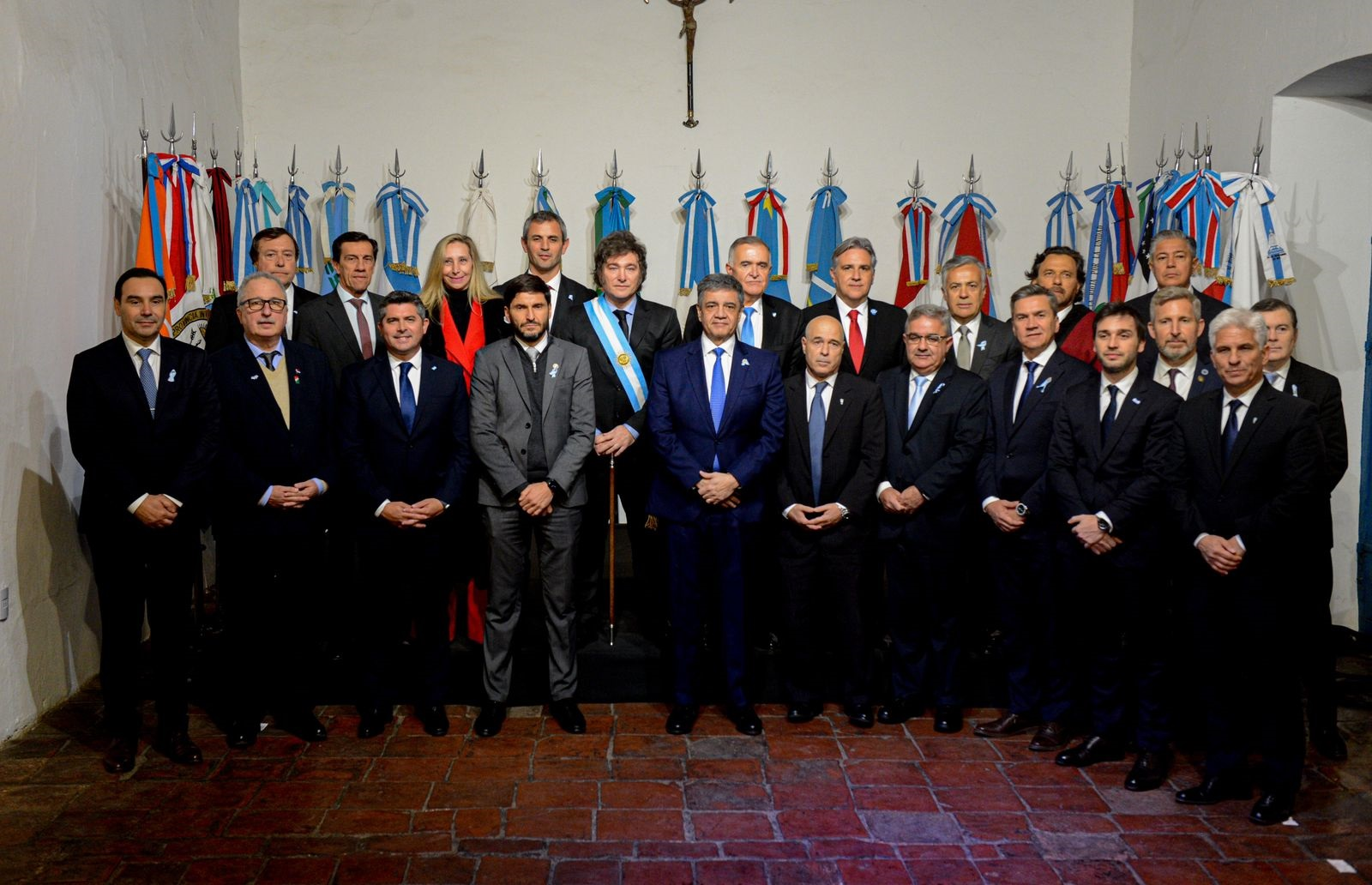
Milei and the governors meet on July 9, 2024, for the May 25th Pact

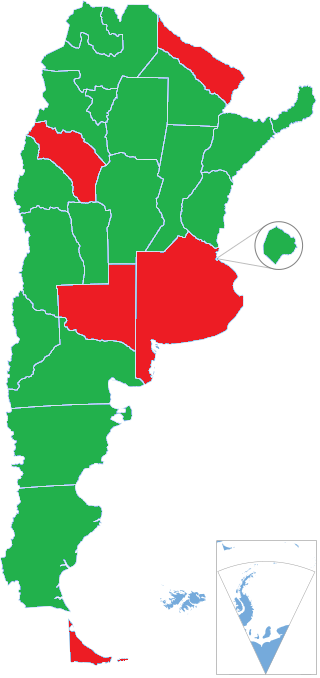
Provinces signing the Pact. Provinces not signing the pact.
