= Christian Democratic Party (Argentina) =

Political party in Argentina

Christian Democratic Party Partido Demócrata Cristiano
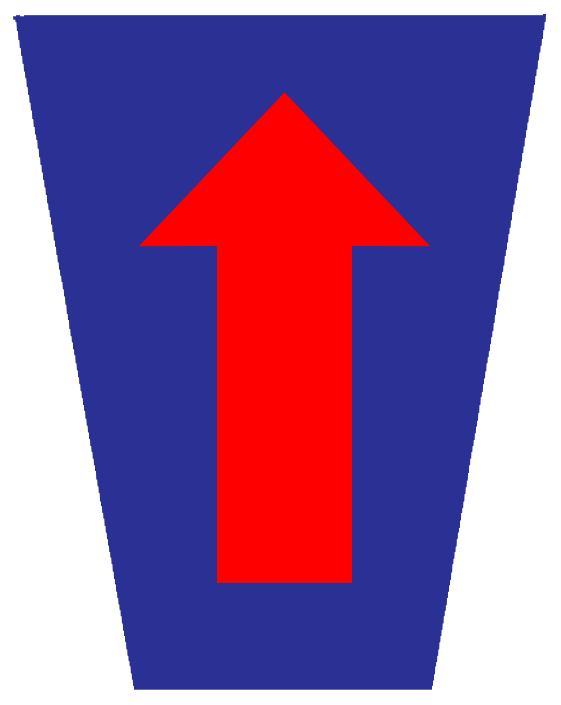
- Abbreviation: PDC
- Leader: Juan Fernando Brügge
- President: Nidia Margarita Sosa
- Vice President: Juan Fernando Brügge
- Founded: 9 July 1954; 71 years ago
- Split from: Justicialist Party; National Democratic Party
- Headquarters: Combate de los Pozos 1055, Piso 1, Buenos Aires
- Ideology: Christian democracy; Social conservatism
- Political position: Centre
- National affiliation: Hacemos por Nuestro País; Formally: Federal Consensus
- International affiliation: Centrist Democrat International
- Regional affiliation: Christian Democrat Organization of America
- Seats in the Chamber of Deputies: 0 / 257
- Seats in the Senate: 0 / 72

Website
- www.partidodemocratacristiano.com.ar

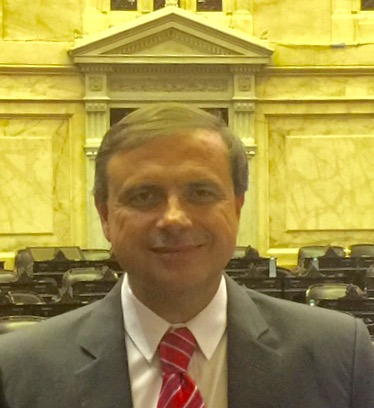
Juan Fernando Brügge, former President of the PDC (2011–2015), is the current vice-president and sole National Deputy of the party.

The Christian Democratic Party (Spanish: Partido Demócrata Cristiano, PDC), also called simply Christian Democracy (Spanish: Democracia Cristiana, DC), is a Christian democrat political party in Argentina.

== History ==
In 1947, the Christian Democrat Organization of America was founded to advocate the principles of Christian Democracy in their respective countries. Each of the member parties is different, sometimes having differing views of Christian Democracy itself. Some of the member parties are in government in their country, others are in coalition government, and others are not in government.

When President Perón was reelected in 1952, the government's relationship with the Catholic Church also worsened. As Perón increasingly distanced itself from the Church, the government, which had first respected the Church's privileges, now took them away in a distinctly confrontational fashion. By 1954, the Peronist was openly anti-Church. Meanwhile, a Christian Democratic Party was founded in 1954 after several other organisations had been active promoting Christian democracy in Argentina.

The Party was founded in 1954 after several other organisations had been active promoting Christian democracy in Argentina. Leading activists in its early years included Manuel Vicente Ordonez, Lucas Ayarragaray h., José Allende and Horacio Sueldo.

In 1973, the Party split, with Allende's Popular Christian Party being part of the Peronist Frejuli front which brought Héctor José Cámpora to power, opposed by Sueldo's Revolutionary Christian Party which worked with the Intransigent Party and joined the left-wing Popular Revolutionary Alliance.

After the return of democracy in 1983, the Christian Democratic Party was reunited. In 1989, the Party formed an alliance with the Justicialist Party to support the presidential bid of Carlos Menem. Shortly after Menem won the election, the PDC left the coalition, but not before the strategy had provoked a split in its ranks. The PDC's leader, Carlos Auyero, and his followers in the 'Humanism and Liberation' grouping left the Party to help form what would become the Broad Front with Carlos Álvarez and other dissident Peronists.

The party was part of the centre-left FrePaSo coalition formed by the Broad Front in the 1990s and entered government in 1999 as part of the Alianza between FrePaSo and the Radical Civic Union that brought Fernando de la Rúa to the presidency. The Alianza collapsed in 2001 and FrePaSo effectively disappeared.

After 2003, the Party backed the Presidency of Néstor Kirchner and joined the Plural Consensus in support of his Front for Victory. In 2007, the Party backed the election of Cristina Fernández de Kirchner as President.

In 2011, however, the Party changed affiliation and supported opposition candidate Eduardo Duhalde.

== Current Day ==
José Manuel de la Sota, ex-governor of Córdoba Province, was the candidate of the Christian Democratic Party in the 2015 presidential election in part of the United for a New Alternative political coalition.

In 2015, Juan Fernando Brügge was elected to the Chamber of Deputies for his province, representing the centrist Christian Democratic Party, part of the United for a New Alternative political coalition.

== See also ==
- Christian democracy
- Catholic social teaching
- Christianity and politics
- List of Christian democratic parties around the world

== Literature ==
- van Kersbergen, Kees (1995). Social Capitalism: A study of Christian democracy and the welfare state. Routledge.
- Mainwaring, Scott; Scully, Timothy R. (2003), Christian Democracy in Latin America: Electoral Competition and Regime Conflicts, Stanford University Press, ISBN 0-8047-4597-8
- Kalyvas, Stathis N. and Kees van Kersbergen (2010). "Christian Democracy". Annual Review of Political Science 2010. 13:183–209.
