= Daniel Filmus =

Argentine politician

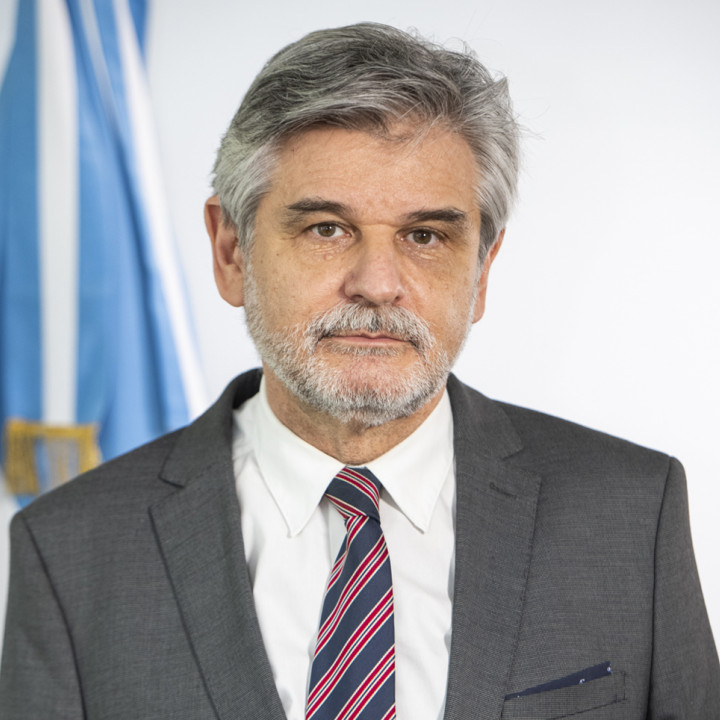

Minister of Science, Technology and Innovation
- In office 20 September 2021 – 10 December 2023
- President: Alberto Fernández
- Preceded by: Roberto Salvarezza
- Succeeded by: Office abolished

Secretary of Malvinas Affairs
- In office 27 December 2019 – 20 September 2021
- Preceded by: Mateo Estreme (as Undersecretary)
- Succeeded by: Guillermo Carmona
- In office 6 January 2014 – 10 December 2015
- Preceded by: Javier Esteban Figueroa (as General Director)
- Succeeded by: María Teresa Kralikas (as Undersecretary)

National Senator
- In office 10 December 2007 – 10 December 2013
- Constituency: City of Buenos Aires

Minister of Education, Science and Technology
- In office 25 May 2003 – 10 December 2007
- President: Néstor Kirchner
- Preceded by: Graciela Giannettasio
- Succeeded by: Juan Carlos Tedesco

Personal details
- Born: June 3, 1955 (age 71) Buenos Aires, Argentina
- Party: Justicialist Party
- Other political affiliations: Front for Victory (2003–2017); Citizen's Unity (2017–2019); Frente de Todos (2019–present)
- Education: University of Buenos Aires
- Profession: Sociologist
- Website: www.danielfilmus.com.ar

Daniel Fernando Filmus (Spanish pronunciation: [daˈnjel feɾˈnando ˈfilmus]; born June 3, 1955) is an Argentine politician and academic, who served as the country's Minister of Science, Technology and Innovation, from 2021 to 2023.

Filmus formerly served as a National Senator for the City of Buenos Aires from 2007 to 2013, and as Minister of Education, Science and Technology in the government of President Néstor Kirchner. From 2014 to 2015, and later from 2019 to 2021, he was Secretary of Affairs pertaining to the Malvinas (Falkland Islands).

== Early life and career ==
Born in La Paternal, Buenos Aires, to María Cecilia Cwik and Salomón Filmus, his mother was an English language teacher of Polish descent, and his father a Jewish immigrant from Bessarabia (now Moldova) who arrived in Argentina in 1928 and became a shopkeeper. Daniel Filmus was briefly involved in the Communist youth wing as a teenager, and enrolled at the University of Buenos Aires (UBA). He became involved in Peronist politics as a student union activist, and helped establish an office of the Permanent Assembly for Human Rights at UBA. He studied psychology and sociology at the university, and earned a degree in the latter in 1977. Filmus became a secondary school teacher, working in Entre Ríos and Chaco Provinces. He earned a specialization in adult education at CREFAL, a literacy promotion program in Mexico, and a master's degree in education at the Fluminense Federal University in Rio de Janeiro in 1989. Filmus never married. He had a daughter in 1992 during his first long-term relationship, and another daughter in 2002 with his second partner, Marisa Factorovich, a psychoanalyst.

Filmus became a professor of sociology at UBA in 1985 and served as president of the UBA Sociology Alumni Association, writing several books on the subject. He served in the Citizen Power Council of Buenos Aires and as staff researcher in the Latin American School of Social Studies (FLACSO), whose Argentine chapter he headed between 1992 and 2000.

== Political career ==
Filmus was appointed secretary of education of the City of Buenos Aires by Mayor Aníbal Ibarra, who asked him to become his running mate for his successful 2003 bid for reelection. Newly inaugurated president Néstor Kirchner appointed Filmus Minister of Education before the mayoral race began, however. Filmus also served as staff researcher at the National Research Council from 1997, and as president of the UNESCO Debt-for-Education task force from 2006.

Filmus ran for mayor of Buenos Aires on the Kirchnerist Front for Victory ticket in 2007. He came in second in the first round, and was defeated by Republican Proposal candidate Mauricio Macri by nearly 22% in the runoff. He was, however, elected Senator for Buenos Aires and took office in December 2007; he was named president of the Committee on the Environment and Sustainable Development.

He again ran as the Front for Victory candidate mayor of Buenos Aires in 2011, naming his rival in the primaries, Labor Minister Carlos Tomada, as his running mate. The results were largely a replay of the 2007 election, however, with a second place showing in the first round and Macri's eventual reelection in the runoff by a margin of over 28%.

In 2021, he was appointed as Minister of Science, Technology and Innovation in replacement of Roberto Salvarezza, as part of a cabinet reshuffle following the government's poor showings in the 2021 legislative primary elections.
