= Legislature of Córdoba =

Legislative body of Córdoba Province, Argentina

Legislature of Córdoba Province

Type
- Type: Unicameral

Leadership
- President (Vice Governor): Manuel Calvo (HPC) since 10 December 2019
- Provisional President: Oscar Félix González (HPC) since 10 December 2019
- Vice President: Vacant since 10 December 2021
- 1st Vice President: Alberto Ambrosio (JXC) since 10 December 2019
- 2nd Vice President: Marcelo Cossar (UCR) since 10 December 2019

Structure
- Seats: 70 legislators
- Legislature political groups: Government (51): HPC; Opposition (19): JXC (8); UCR (5); EVC (2); CC ARI (1); FIT (1); MST—NI (1)
- Length of term: 4 years
- Authority: Constitution of Córdoba

Elections
- Legislature voting system: Parallel voting
- Last Legislature election: 12 May 2019
- Next Legislature election: 2023

Meeting place
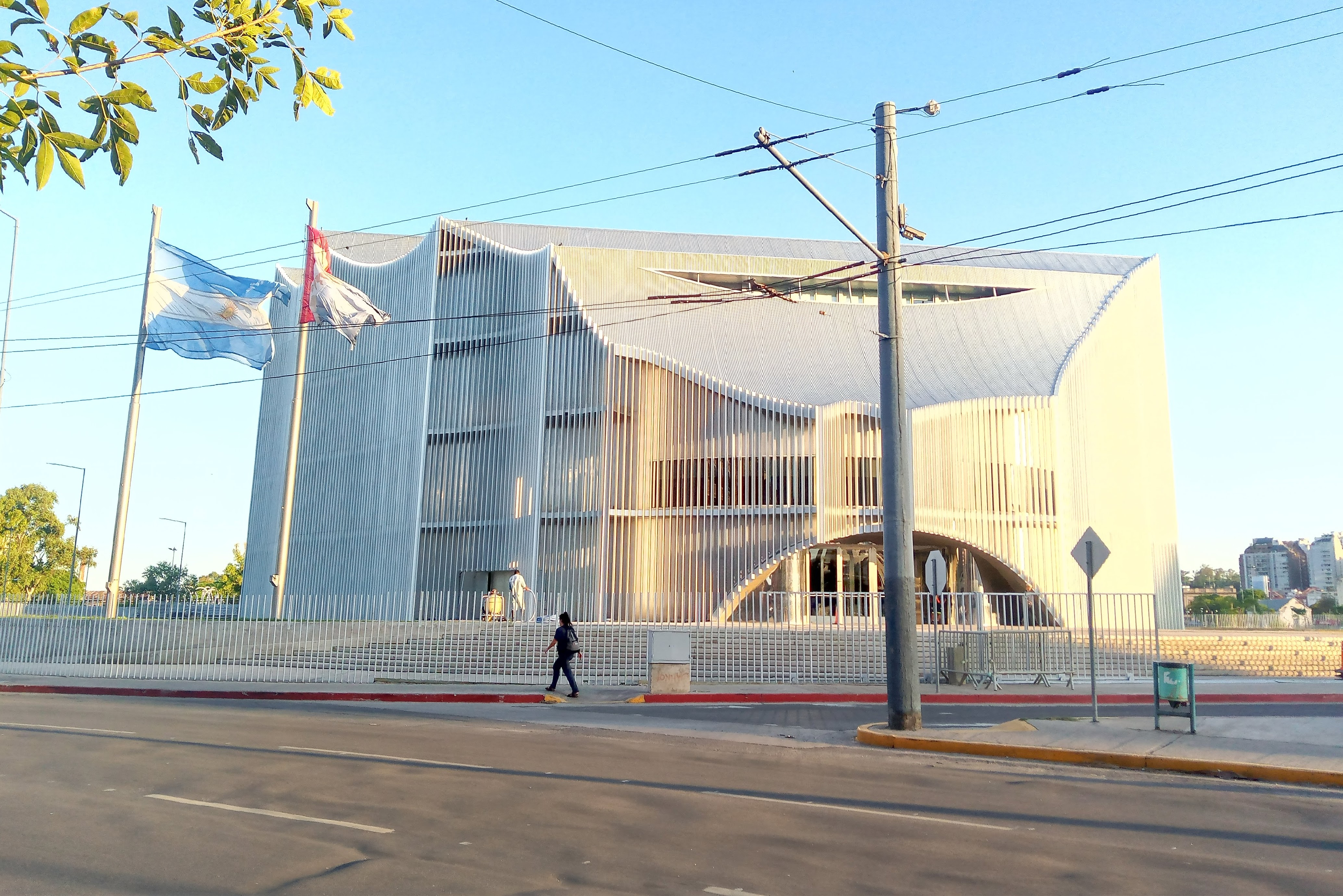

Website
- legislaturacba.gob.ar

The Legislature of Córdoba (Spanish: Legislatura de la provincia de Córdoba) is the unicameral legislative body of Córdoba Province, in Argentina. It comprises 70 legislators, of which 23 are elected directly in each of the 23 departments of Córdoba, while the remaining 44 are elected in a single province-wide district. All legislators serve four-year terms and are elected concurrently.

The unicameral Legislature was created in 2001 following a reform to the provincial constitution; before that, Córdoba was one of nine (now eight) provinces counting with a bicameral legislature, split between a Senate and a Chamber of Deputies.

Since 2019 the Legislature has had its seat in a new building in the City of Córdoba, the provincial capital. The building was designed by Morini Arquitectos.

== Constitutional previsions ==
The Constitution of Córdoba Province, sanctioned in 2001, lays out the responsibilities and limitations of the Legislature and its members. According to Article 76, the legislature will be composed of:

- 26 legislators elected directly by the people by a plurality of votes in each of the departments of the province, taking each of these as a single district,
- 44 legislators elected directly and proportionally by the people, taking the entirety of the province as a single district.

Article 83 states that the mandate of all legislators is limited to four years. Legislators may be re-elected an indefinite number of times. All legislators begin their mandates on the same day as the governor is inaugurated.

=== Requirements ===
Article 82 of the provincial constitution outlines the requirements for aspiring members of the Legislature. They must:

- be at least 18 years old at the time they take office;
- have had Argentine citizenship for at least five years prior to taking office;
- have resided in Córdoba Province continuously for at least two years prior to their election. This does not account for absences caused in the exercise of political or technical offices at the service of the federal and provincial governments;

Legislators elected in single-member districts must be natives of their department, or have resided in said department for no less than three years prior to the election.

== Last election ==
The last election to the Legislature was held on 12 May 2019. All elected members took office on 10 December 2019. We Do for Córdoba (Spanish: Hacemos por Córdoba, HPC), the alliance backing incumbent governor Juan Schiaretti, won the election with 53% of the vote, and took 51 out of 70 seats in the Legislature.

Party / alliance	Single-district legislators			Departmental legislators			Total seats
Party / alliance	Votes	%	Seats	Votes	%	Seats	Total seats
We Do for Córdoba	878,123	53.30	26 / 44	887,137	52.68	25 / 26	51 / 70
Córdoba Cambia	294,360	17.87	8 / 44	297,913	17.69		8 / 70
Radical Civic Union	205,156	12.45	6 / 44	222,093	13.19	1 / 26	7 / 70
Córdoba Neighbourhood Encounter	81,288	4.93	2 / 44	78,555	4.66	—	2 / 70
Workers' Left Front	60,046	3.64	1 / 44	62,946	3.74	—	1 / 70
MST–New Left	37,051	2.25	1 / 44	37,989	2.26	—	1 / 70
Independent Vecinalism	25,630	1.56	—	24,708	1.47	—	
Humanist Party	20,563	1.25	—	19,773	1.17	—	
Citizen Union	14,429	0.82	—	14,458	0.86	—	
Neighbourhood Action Movement	9,005	0.55	—	12,388	0.74	—	
Socialist Advance Movement	7,678	0.47	—	8,565	0.51	—	
Union of the Democratic Centre	6,868	0.42	—	7,427	0.44	—	
Open Politics for Social Integration	5,767	0.35	—	7,200	0.43	—	
Unite for Liberty and Dignity	2,568	0.16	—	2,773	0.16	—	
Positive votes	1,647,532	78.33	—	1,683,925	80.06	—	
Blank votes	397,463	18.90	—	354,053	16.83	—	
Null votes	58,423	2.78	—	65,440	3.11	—	
Turnout	2,103,418	72.78	—	2,103,418	72.78	—	
Registered electors	2,889,973	100	—	2,889,973	100	—	
Source: justiciacordoba.gob.ar (in Spanish)
