= Guillermo Carmona =

Argentine politician (born 1967)

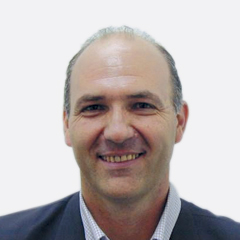

Secretary of Malvinas Affairs
- In office 24 September 2021 – 10 December 2023
- President: Alberto Fernández
- Preceded by: Daniel Filmus
- Succeeded by: Paola Di Chiaro

National Deputy
- In office 10 December 2011 – 10 December 2019
- Constituency: Mendoza

Provincial Deputy of Mendoza
- In office 10 December 2003 – 10 December 2007
- Constituency: Maipú

Personal details
- Born: 26 June 1967 (age 59) Guaymallén, Argentina
- Party: Justicialist Party
- Other political affiliations: Front for Victory (2003–2017); Frente de Todos (2019–2023)
- Education: University of Buenos Aires

Guillermo Ramón Carmona (born 26 June 1967) is an Argentine lawyer and politician of the Justicialist Party. From 2021 to 2023, he served as Secretary of Malvinas Affairs, a special post in the Argentine Foreign Ministry.

Carmona formerly served as a National Deputy elected for the Front for Victory in his native Mendoza Province from 2011 to 2019. He also served as Secretary for the Environment of Mendoza from 2007 to 2011, during the governorship of Celso Jaque, and as a member of the Legislature of Mendoza.

== Early life ==
Carmona was born on 26 June 1967 in the Guaymallén Department of Mendoza Province, Argentina. He has a law degree and a specialisation on public law from the University of Buenos Aires, and post-graduate degrees on Social Sciences (2000) and Political Economy (2002) from the Latin American Faculty of Social Sciences (FLACSO).

== Political career ==
Carmona was elected to the Deliberative Council of Maipú Department in 1998, serving in the position until 2002. In 2003, he was elected to the Chamber of Deputies of Mendoza in representation of the Maipú Department, and served as the chamber's vice president from 2005 to 2007. He was also appointed as the Chamber's representative to the Mendoza Province Council of Magistracy.

From December 2007 to April 2011, he was Secretary for the Environment of Mendoza, during the governorship of Celso Jaque. In this role, he was also a member of the Federal Council for the Environment of the Argentine Republic (COFEMA) in representation of Mendoza.

In the 2011 general election, Carmona ran for one of Mendoza's seats in the National Chamber of Deputies as the first candidate in the Front for Victory (FPV) list. The FPV was the most voted alliance in the province, with 46.66% of the vote, and Carmona was elected. During this first term as deputy, he served as president of the parliamentary commission on foreign affairs. Carmona was re-elected for a second term in 2015, as the second candidate in the FPV list, which received 29.97% of the vote.

From 2018 to 2020, he was president of the Mendoza chapter of the Justicialist Party.

=== Secretary of Malvinas Affairs ===
In September 2021, Malvinas Secretary Daniel Filmus was appointed as Education Minister, and Carmona was tapped as his replacement. During his time in Congress, Carmona had sponsored a bill to declare Namuncurá–Burdwood Bank a protected maritime area. In addition, he authored a law to increase pension benefits to Malvinas War veterans and worked alongside Filmus to have the 2012 Declaration of Ushuaia pass through Congress with unanimous support.

As secretary, Carmona has reiterated Argentina's claim to sovereignty over the Falkland Islands, the South Georgia and the South Sandwich Islands, as well as the surrounding maritime spaces.

== Personal life ==
Carmona has three children.
