= José Manuel de la Sota =

Argentine politician (1949–2018)

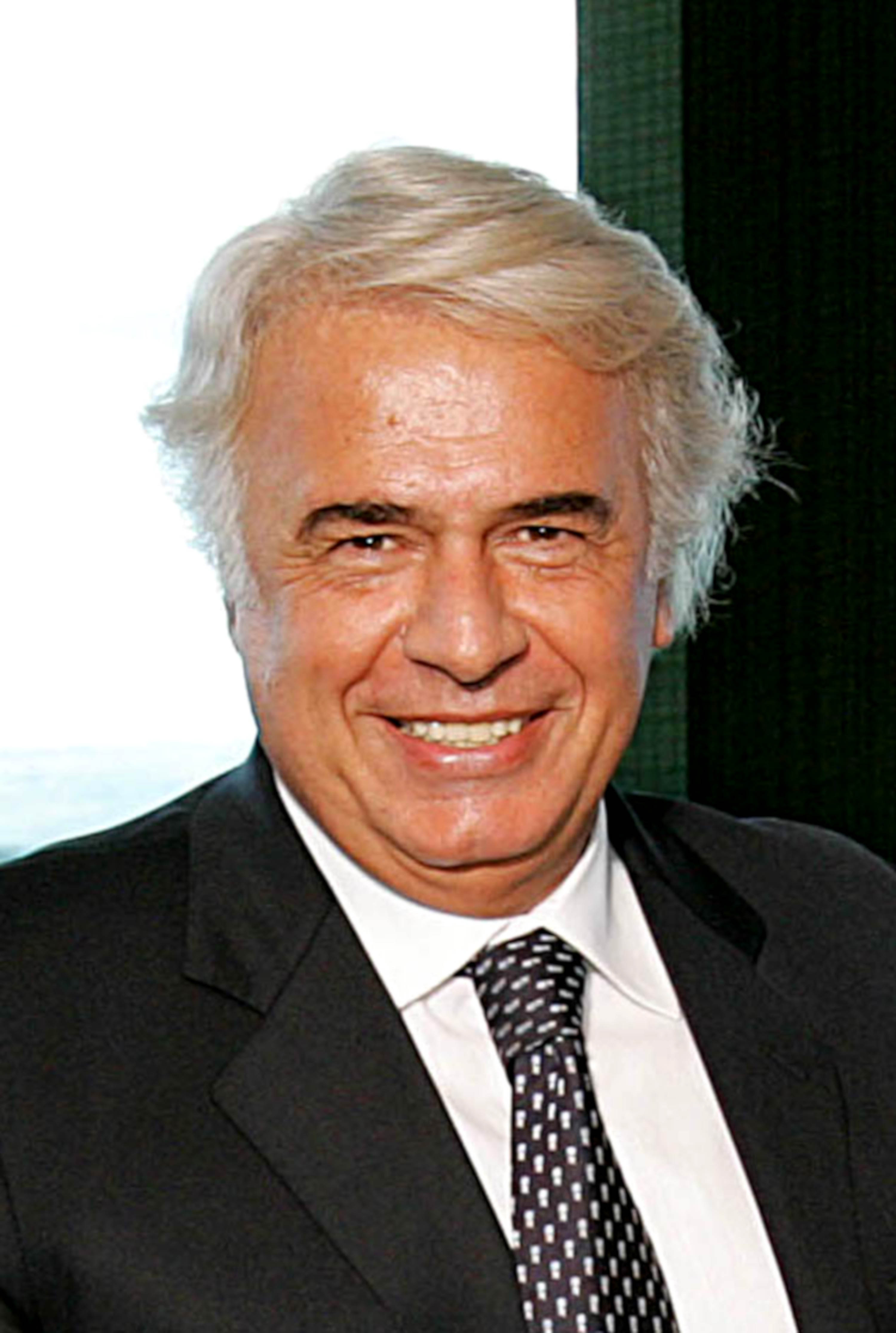
- de la Sota in 2007

57th and 59th Governor of Córdoba
- In office 10 December 2011 – 10 December 2015
- Deputy: Alicia Pregno
- Preceded by: Juan Schiaretti
- Succeeded by: Juan Schiaretti
- In office 12 July 1999 – 10 December 2007
- Lieutenant: Germán Kammerath (1999); Hernán Olivero (acting 1999–2003); Juan Schiaretti (2003–07)
- Preceded by: Ramón Mestre
- Succeeded by: Juan Schiaretti

National Senator
- In office 10 December 1995 – 12 July 1999
- Constituency: Córdoba

Personal details
- Born: 28 November 1949 Córdoba, Córdoba Province Argentina
- Died: 15 September 2018 (aged 68) Altos Fierro, Córdoba Province, Argentina
- Cause of death: Traffic accident
- Party: Justicialist Party
- Other political affiliations: Union for Córdoba; United for a New Alternative
- Spouse(s): Silvia Zanichelli (m. 1972; div. 1989) Olga Riutort (m. 1989; div. 2004) Adriana Nazario (m. 2005)
- Education: National University of Córdoba
- Profession: Lawyer

José Manuel de la Sota (28 November 1949 – 15 September 2018) was an Argentine politician who was a member of Justicialist Party. He was the governor of Córdoba Province from 1999 until 2007, and was reelected to the post for the 2011–15 term.

== Early life and career ==
Born in Córdoba, de la Sota studied law at the National University of Córdoba and married Silvia Zanichelli, the daughter of former Governor Arturo Zanichelli, in 1972. He was designated Legislative Secretary to Córdoba Councilman Miguel Flores, a left-wing Peronist, in 1973, and Chief of Staff to Mayor José Domingo Coronel, a right-wing Peronist, in 1975; the March 1976 coup, however, cut his political career short.

The return of democracy in 1983 led de la Sota to run in the Justicialist Party (Peronist) primaries for governor. Coming in second, he ran for Mayor of Córdoba, but was amply defeated by UCR candidate Ramón Mestre. He was, despite a continued poor showing by the Peronists in the province, one of four candidates elected on the party list to the Argentine Chamber of Deputies for Córdoba Province in 1985. He served in the 1986 Provincial Constitutional Convention as the body's vice president, and secured the nomination as candidate for governor in 1987; he was defeated by the incumbent, Eduardo Angeloz of the UCR, by 5%, however.

The tragic death in 1989 of one of his daughters led to his divorce, and in December 1989, he married Olga Riutort, a San Juan Province Peronist lawmaker. He had been reelected to Congress, but resigned in 1990 to accept a post as Ambassador to Brazil. De la Sota again ran for governor of Córdoba in 1991. Defeated by Governor Angeloz by over 15%, this latter setback was significant because it cost De la Sota much of his support within the Justicialist Party (which was flush with victory in the 1991 mid-terms), leading to President Carlos Menem's endorsement of a separate party list in Córdoba for the 1993 mid-term elections, and to De la Sota's failure to regain a seat in Congress.

The 1994 amendment of the Argentine Constitution raised the number of Senators from two to three (giving the largest minority party in each province the third seat), and this allowed De la Sota to return to high-profile elected office as a Senator in 1995. His tenure in the Senate was highlighted by a largely unsuccessful effort to reform the nation's budget process, proposing a fiscally conservative program that would replace the value added tax for a national sales tax of 15%, and would limit spending.

== Governorship ==
He was elected Governor of Córdoba in December 1998, defeating Governor Mestre (in the first Córdoba governor's race won by Peronists since the 1950s). He launched a putative campaign for president in 2002, though he withdrew in favor of his candidacy for a second four-year term as governor, which he obtained by nearly 15%.

De la Sota and Olga Riutort had two daughters, but divorced in 2004. As governor, he emphasized public works, and during his tenure, 340 schools and over 20,000 public housing units were completed (in a province of 3 million inhabitants). He reaped controversy, however, following his creation of a Corruption Prosecution Office in 2000. The director appointed to the office, Luis Juez, uncovered evidence of corruption by, among others, Córdoba Mayor Germán Kammerath, Public Works Minister Carlos Caserio, and the governor's chief of staff (and wife), Olga Riutort. Lacking support from the governor, Juez resigned on October 10, 2002. The governor's expropriation of the former Ferreyra Palace in 2005 for its use as the Evita Fine Arts Museum also proved contentious; the Ferreya family was reportedly compensated with a fraction of the landmark's market value, and most of the mansion's grand interiors were lost during its subsequent conversion as a museum.

He joined President Néstor Kirchner in supporting Vice-Governor Juan Schiaretti, who was elected in 2007 over Juez in highly contested results. Following speculation that his 2011 bid for governor would be as an opponent to Kirchnerism, de la Sota gave President Cristina Kirchner his endorsement late in the campaign. He was returned to the office of Governor of Córdoba by voters in the August 7, 2011, elections, defeating Juez and UCR candidate Oscar Aguad. Governor de la Sota distanced himself from the president following the 2011 elections amid a dispute over ANSES social security funds in excess of a billion pesos (US$210 million), and in September 2012 established a local Federal Peronist faction opposed to Kirchnerism.

The governor sought the nomination for president during the 2015 election on the centrist United for a New Alternative, coming in second to Sergio Massa on the 9 August primary. His support of right-wing candidate Mauricio Macri ahead of the November 22 runoff helped Macri win Córdoba Province by 43%, giving him a 931,000 margin in the province that exceeded the 679,000 margin he won nationwide.

De la Sota died in a car crash on 15 September 2018; he was 68.

Preceded by Ramón Mestre	Governor of Córdoba; 1999–2007	Succeeded by Juan Schiaretti
Preceded by Juan Schiaretti	Governor of Córdoba; 2011–2015	Succeeded by Juan Schiaretti
