= Fernanda Vallejos =

Argentine politician

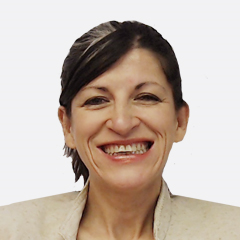

National Deputy
- In office 10 December 2017 – 10 December 2021
- Constituency: Buenos Aires

Personal details
- Born: 9 March 1979 (age 47) Zárate, Argentina
- Party: Justicialist Party
- Other political affiliations: Citizen's Unity (2017–2019); Frente de Todos (2019–present)
- Education: University of Buenos Aires
- Profession: Economist, politician

María Fernanda Vallejos (born 9 March 1979) is an Argentine economist and politician who served as a National Deputy elected in Buenos Aires Province. She was elected in 2017, when she was the first candidate in the Unidad Ciudadana list, and later sat in the Frente de Todos bloc.

Vallejos was born in Zárate, Buenos Aires Province. She studied economics at the University of Buenos Aires, and has a master's degree in economic history and policies. She worked as an advisor on national accounts at the Ministry of Economy under then-minister Axel Kicillof, who was her professor at the University of Buenos Aires. She was also an economic advisor at the National Congress.

At the 2017 legislative election, Vallejos was the first candidate in the Unidad Ciudadana list to the Chamber of Deputies in Buenos Aires Province; the list received 36.28% of the popular vote and Vallejos was elected.
