= Hacemos por Córdoba =

Argentine political coalition

We Act for Córdoba Hacemos por Córdoba
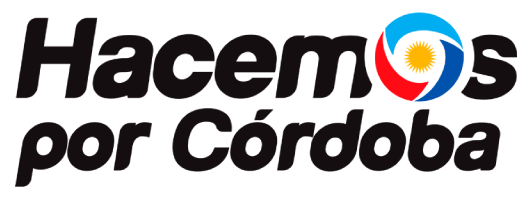
- Founder: Juan Schiaretti
- Founded: 2019
- Preceded by: Union for Córdoba
- Ideology: Peronism; Federal Peronism; Third Way
- Political position: Centre-right
- National affiliation: Hacemos por Nuestro País
- Members: List: Justicialist Party; Faith Party; PDC; MID; Federal Commitment; Socialist Party; Intransigent Party; GEN Party
- Argentine Chamber of Deputies (Córdoba seats): 4 / 9
- Argentine Senate (Córdoba seats): 1 / 3
- Seats in the Córdoba Legislature: 51 / 70

Website
- Official website

Hacemos por Córdoba (HPC, lit. 'We Act for Córdoba') is a provincial political coalition in Córdoba Province, Argentina. It was formed in 2019 to support the gubernatorial candidacy of Juan Schiaretti by the Union for Córdoba – another political coalition consisting of, chiefly, the Justicialist Party – as well as the Socialist Party, the Intransigent Party and the GEN Party.

The coalition won the 2019 provincial elections with ease; Schiaretti received 57.38% of the vote and the coalition now holds a qualified majority in the Legislature of Córdoba. Additionally, the coalition has representation in the National Congress, with one senator (Carlos Caserio) and four deputies (Cassinerio, Márquez, Vigo and Gutiérrez).
