= Juan Schiaretti =

Argentine politician (born 1949)

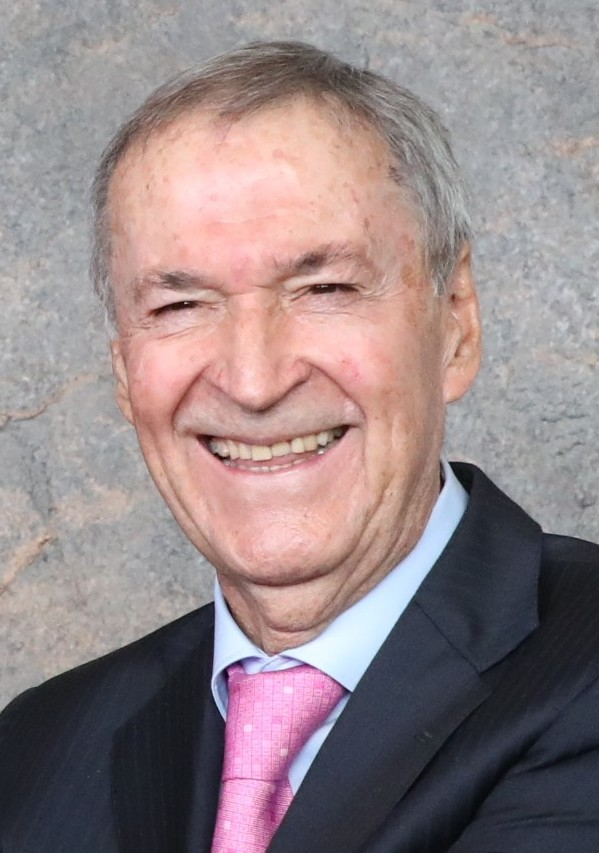
- Schiaretti in 2022

Governor of Córdoba
- In office December 10, 2015 – December 10, 2023
- Vice Governor: Martín Llaryora; Manuel Calvo
- Preceded by: José Manuel de la Sota
- Succeeded by: Martín Llaryora
- In office December 10, 2007 – December 9, 2011
- Vice Governor: Héctor Campana
- Preceded by: José Manuel de la Sota
- Succeeded by: José Manuel de la Sota

Vice Governor of Córdoba
- In office July 12, 2003 – December 10, 2007
- Governor: José Manuel de la Sota
- Preceded by: Germán Kammerath
- Succeeded by: Héctor Campana

Federal Interventor of Santiago del Estero Province
- In office December 18, 1993 – July 6, 1995
- Preceded by: Fernando Lobo (governor)
- Succeeded by: Carlos Arturo Juárez (governor)

Personal details
- Born: June 19, 1949 (age 77) Córdoba, Argentina
- Party: Justicialist
- Other political affiliations: Union for Córdoba (1998–2019); Hacemos por Córdoba (since 2019)
- Spouse: Alejandra Vigo (m. 2007)
- Profession: Accountant

Juan Schiaretti (born June 19, 1949), known as El Gringo, is an Argentine accountant and Justicialist Party politician. He was Governor of Córdoba Province from 2015 to 2023.

== Early life ==
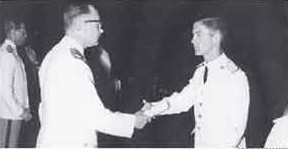
Schiaretti during his 1965 graduation from the General Paz Military Lyceum

Schiaretti was born in Córdoba, Argentina, to Julia Álamo and Dante Schiaretti. His father was a railway worker and Peronist activist descended from immigrants from Parma. He was imprisoned after the military coup which toppled President Juan Perón in 1955. His mother is a housewife. Schiaretti studied at the Escuela Pública Nacional N°95, in the Talleres Oeste neighbourhood, then at the Liceo Militar General Paz, which he entered at eleven and left with the gold medal for best academic achievement of his group (1961 to 1965). He enrolled at the School of Economic Sciences of the National University of Córdoba, where he qualified as a public accountant at age 21. He married a fellow political activist and had two children.

Schiaretti was threatened by the Triple A and in 1975, moved with his family to Neuquén. The military coup of 1976, forced him into exile in Brazil. He worked as a salesman then found work as an administrative assistant at Fiat in Belo Horizonte. He stayed with the company and rose to be deputy director of administration.

== Political career ==
Schiaretti returned to Argentina in 1984, and separated from his wife. He worked in politics and was sub-secretary of Latin American Integration in the Ministry of International Relations under President Carlos Menem between 1989 and 1991, then Secretary of Industry and Commerce in the Ministry of Economy between 1991 and 1993, during the same administration. He was appointed Federal Interventor for Santiago del Estero Province from 1993 to 1995, following the removal of the province's governor, and was then elected to the Argentine Chamber of Deputies for Córdoba Province, serving from 1995 to 1997. Schiaretti married Córdoba politician Alejandra María Vigo, secretary general of the Córdoba section of the housewives' union, in 1997. He was provincial minister of production in Córdoba from 1999 to 2001, then returned as Deputy for the province from 2001 to 2002 before becoming provincial Minister of Production and Finances 2002–03.

In 2003, Schiaretti was elected vice-governor of his province with José Manuel de la Sota as governor. In 2007, upon de la Sota's retirement, Schiaretti stood for the governorship for the Justicialist Party in the Union for Córdoba Coalition, with Héctor 'Pichi' Campana (a former basketball player and New Party Councillor who had originally intended to stand in his own right). His principal opponent was the Mayor of Córdoba, Luis Juez and Schiaretti trailed in the polls for some time. In the 2007 election, there were claims of electoral fraud and the result went to recounts and was finally declared for Schiaretti by the electoral court of the province.

Following the 2008 Argentine government conflict with the agricultural sector, Schiaretti became distanced from the national Peronist leadership of President Cristina Fernández de Kirchner and Néstor Kirchner. Ahead of the legislative elections of June 2009, he announced he would be running his own list for the National Congress, headed by Eduardo Mondino, in opposition to the Kirchners' Front for Victory.

In the 2023 Argentine general election, he ran for president as the head of the centrist Hacemos por Nuestro País alliance and came 4th in the first round.

Preceded by Fernando Lobo	Governor of Santiago del Estero; 1993–1995	Succeeded by Carlos Arturo Juárez
Preceded by José Manuel de la Sota	Governor of Córdoba; 2007–2011	Succeeded by José Manuel de la Sota
Preceded by José Manuel de la Sota	Governor of Córdoba; 2015–2023	Succeeded by Martín Llaryora
