= Union for Córdoba =

Argentine political coalition

Union for Córdoba Unión por Córdoba
- Founder: José Manuel de la Sota
- Founded: 1998
- Dissolved: 2019
- Succeeded by: We Do for Córdoba
- Ideology: Peronism
- Political position: Centre
- Colors: Teal
- Members: Justicialist Party; Faith Party; PDC; MID; PCP; PAIS

The Union for Córdoba (Spanish: Unión por Córdoba) was a provincial coalition of political parties in Córdoba Province, Argentina. It included the provincial chapters of the Justicialist Party, Union of the Democratic Centre, Acción para el Cambio, and the Christian Democratic Party, among others, as well as other provincial parties.

It was founded in 1998 by José Manuel de la Sota, then president of the Córdoba Justicialist Party. De la Sota was eventually succeeded by Juan Schiaretti. Both de la Sota and Schiaretti served as governors of Córdoba.

On 12 March 2019, the Unión por Córdoba was dissolved as a new coalition called We Do for Córdoba was formed, together with the Socialist Party, the Intransigent Party, the GEN Party and other small center-left parties.
