= 1901 in Argentina =

- Decades: 1880s; 1890s; 1900s; 1910s; 1920s
- See also: Other events of 1901; List of years in Argentina

== Incumbents ==
- President: Julio Argentino Roca

=== Governors ===
- Buenos Aires Province: Bernardo de Irigoyen
- Cordoba: Donaciano del Campillo then José Manuel Álvarez
- Mendoza Province: Jacinto Álvarez then Elías Villanueva

=== Vice Governors ===
- Buenos Aires Province: Alfredo Demarchi

== Events ==
- 25 March – The Argentine Regional Workers' Federation, a syndicalist movement, is founded.
- 17 May – José Manuel Álvarez becomes Governor of Córdoba.
- December - Scientist José María Sobral joins the Swedish Antarctic Expedition in Buenos Aires, thus becoming the first Argentine to set foot on Antarctica.

== Births ==
- 25 January – Martín de Álzaga, Argentinian race car driver and pilot (died 1982)
- 27 February – Horatio Luro, Argentine-born American horse trainer (died 1991)
- 17 April – Raúl Prebisch, economist (died 1986)
- 13 November – Arturo Jauretche, writer, politician, and philosopher (died 1974)
- 2 December – Raimundo Orsi, footballer (died 1986)
- 24 December – Nina Negri, artist (died 1981)

== Deaths ==
- 23 August – Enrique Tornú, physician and hygienist (born 1865)
