= 1902 in Argentina =

- Decades: 1880s; 1890s; 1900s; 1910s; 1920s
- See also: Other events of 1902; List of years in Argentina

== Incumbents ==
- President: Julio Argentino Roca

=== Governors ===
- Buenos Aires Province: Bernardo de Irigoyen
- Cordoba: José Manuel Álvarez
- Mendoza Province: Elías Villanueva

=== Vice Governors ===
- Buenos Aires Province: Alfredo Demarchi (until 1 May); Adolfo Saldías (starting 1 May)

== Events ==
- 30 April – Cordillera of the Andes Boundary Case 1902 (Argentina, Chile): Commissioners receive the views of the inhabitants of the "Colonia del Valle 16 de Octubre".
- 28 May – Pacts of May: Chile and Argentina sign four protocols intended to improve relations and resolve territorial disputes.
- 4 June – Settlement of Afrikaner Boers in Argentina begins.
- 12 July – The first of the Neuquén–Cipolletti bridges on the Buenos Aires Great Southern Railway opens to traffic. The first locomotive to pass over it is number 205, driven by Antonio Mazzarolo.
- 20 November – The Cordillera of the Andes Boundary case, a territorial dispute between Argentina and Chile, is decided in Argentina's favour.
- 29 December – The "Drago Doctrine" is put forward by Argentina's Foreign Minister Luis María Drago, stating that countries, including the USA, should not use armed force against other countries to collect debts arising from international loans.
- date unknown – The Paz Palace, Buenos Aires, is commissioned by José C. Paz, the proprietor of the city's then-second most-circulated newspaper, La Prensa.

== Births ==
- 16 February - Yolanda Carenzo, pianist (died 1968)
- 19 March - Manuel Seoane ("La Chancha"), footballer (died 1975)
- 22 April - Raquel Forner, Expressionist painter (died 1988)
- 9 September - Roberto Noble, politician, journalist and publisher (died 1969)
- 12 December - Juan Alberto Montes, surveyor and historian (died 1986)

== Deaths ==
- 13 May - Zenón Rolón, Afro-Argentine musician (born 1856)
- 31 May - Rufina, daughter of Eugenio Cambaceres (born 1883; possible victim of premature burial)

== See also ==
- 1902 in Argentine football
