= 1965 in Argentina =

- Decades: 1940s; 1950s; 1960s; 1970s; 1980s
- See also: Other events of 1965; List of years in Argentina

Events from the year 1965 in Argentina.

== Incumbents ==
- President: Arturo Umberto Illia
- Vice president: Carlos Humberto Perette

=== Governors ===
- Buenos Aires Province: Anselmo Marini
- Cordoba: Justo Páez Molina
- Chubut Province: Roque González then Armando Knischnik then Manuel Pío Raso
- Mendoza Province: Francisco Gabrielli
- Santa Fe Province: Aldo Tessio

=== Vice Governors ===
- Buenos Aires Province: vacant

== Events ==
- 14 March – In the legislative election, the Unión Popular captures 30.9% of the vote.
- May – 1965 Argentina rugby union tour of Rhodesia and South Africa: The Argentine rugby union team embarks on its first tour outside South America.
- 26 October – Operación 90: Argentina launches its first ground expedition to the South Pole.

== Births ==
- 27 January – Ignacio Noe, comic, children's book, and magazine artist
- 13 April – Patricio Pouchulu, architect
- 15 December – Luis Fabián Artime, footballer

== Deaths ==
- 3 August – Antonio Fondevilla, sprinter (born 1916)

== See also ==
- 1965 in Argentine football
- List of Argentine films of 1965
