= 1974 in Argentina =

- Decades: 1950s; 1960s; 1970s; 1980s; 1990s
- See also: Other events of 1974; List of years in Argentina

Events in the year 1974 in Argentina.

== Incumbents ==
- President: Juan Peron until July 1, Isabel Perón
- Vice President: Isabel Perón until July 1, then vacant

=== Governors ===
- Buenos Aires Province:
  - Oscar Bidegain (until 24 January)
  - Victorio Calabró (from 24 January)
- Cordoba: Ricardo Obregón Cano
- Chubut Province: Benito Fernández
- Mendoza Province:
  - Alberto Martínez Baca (until 6 June)
  - Carlos Mendoza (6 June-13 August)
  - Antonio Cafiero (from 13 August)
- Santa Fe Province: Carlos Sylvestre Begnis

=== Vice Governors ===
- Buenos Aires Province: Victorio Calabró (until 24 January); vacant thereafter (starting 24 January)

== Events ==
- May 1 - Expulsion of Montoneros from Plaza de Mayo

== Births ==
- 5 January – Omar Carrasco, conscript and murder victim (d. 1994)
- 30 January – Sebastián Rambert, footballer
- 1 March – Guillermo Morigi, football left winger
- 4 March – Ariel Ortega, footballer
- 1 April – Hugo Ibarra, football right back
- 10 April – Andrés Guglielminpietro, football midfielder
- 13 April – Pablo Cavallero, football goalkeeper
- 29 May – Fernando Pandolfi, footballer
- 17 July – Claudio López, footballer
- 30 July – Hugo Morales, football midfielder
- 31 July – Eduardo Tuzzio, footballer
- 4 August – Kily González, football winger
- 2 September – Hugo Pablo Centurión, footballer
- 10 October – Julio Ricardo Cruz, football forward
- 4 November – Maximiliano Djerfy musician and singer-songwriter (d. 2021)
- 20 November – Claudio Husaín, football midfielder

== Deaths ==
=== May ===
- May 25 - Arturo Jauretche, writer, politician, and philosopher (born 1901)

=== July ===
- July 1 - Juan Peron, president of Argentina

=== September ===
- September 30 - Sofía Cuthbert, wife of Carlos Prats

=== October ===
- October 27 - Jordán Bruno Genta, Catholic writer, philosopher, journalist and educator.

== See also ==
- List of Argentine films of 1974
