= Diego Mestre =

Argentine politician (born 1978)

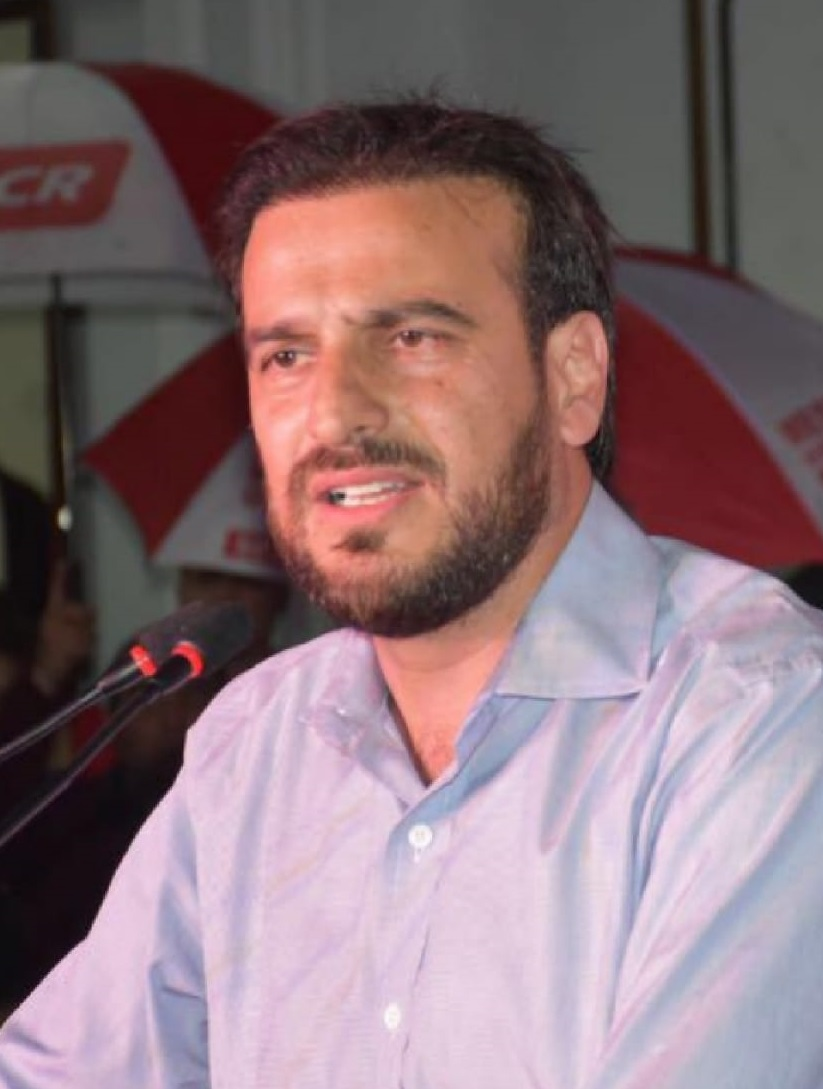

National Deputy
- In office 10 December 2013 – 10 December 2021
- Constituency: Córdoba

Personal details
- Born: 16 March 1978 (age 48) Córdoba, Argentina
- Party: Radical Civic Union
- Other political affiliations: Juntos por el Cambio (2015–present)
- Education: National University of Córdoba

Diego Matías Mestre (born 16 March 1978) is an Argentine politician who served as a National Deputy elected in Córdoba Province from 2013 to 2021. He is a member of the Radical Civic Union (UCR). Mestre is one of former Córdoba governor Ramón Mestre's children.

== Early life and career ==
Mestre was born on 13 March 1978 in Córdoba, the fourth child of Ramón Mestre (1937–2003), and his second son, after Ramón Javier (born 1972). Ramón Mestre was a prominent Radical Civic Union politician, having served as intendente (mayor) of the City of Córdoba from 1983 to 1991, as governor of Córdoba Province from 1995 to 1999, and briefly as Interior Minister during the presidency of Fernando de la Rúa, from March to December 2001.

Diego Mestre studied law at the National University of Córdoba. He is married and has three children.

== Political career ==
Upon his brother's election as mayor of Córdoba in 2011, Mestre was appointed Undersecretary of Control, Inspection, and Civic Coexistence of the municipality of Córdoba. He ran for a seat in the Chamber of Deputies in the 2013 legislative election, as the third candidate in the Radical Civic Union list in Córdoba Province (behind Oscar Aguad and Soledad Carrizo). The list came second in the general election with 22.67% of the vote, and Mestre was elected. Mestre was re-elected in the 2017 legislative election, this time as part of the Cambiemos coalition; he was the fifth candidate in the list. The list was the most voted with 48.48% of the vote.

During his 2017–2019 term, Mestre formed part of the parliamentary commissions on Consumer Rights, Justice, Criminal Legislation, Transport, Petitions, Powers and Norms, Political Trials, and Foreign Affairs. He was an opponent of the legalization of abortion in Argentina, voting against the two Voluntary Interruption of Pregnancy bills that were debated by the Argentine Congress in 2018 and 2020.
