= 1900 in Argentina =

- Decades: 1880s; 1890s; 1900s; 1910s; 1920s
- See also: Other events of 1900; List of years in Argentina

== Incumbents ==
- President: Julio Argentino Roca

=== Governors ===
- Buenos Aires Province: Bernardo de Irigoyen
- Cordoba: Donaciano del Campillo
- Mendoza Province: Jacinto Álvarez

=== Vice Governors ===
- Buenos Aires Province: Alfredo Demarchi

== Events ==
- January 25 - Plague is officially declared in Rosario.
- January 29–February 4 - Buenos Aires suffers its worst heat wave for 20 years. In the first two weeks of February, 403 deaths are certified from "heat apoplexy and sunstroke". The Buenos Aires Herald speculates that some of these are actually caused by plague.
- March 30 - By presidential decree, lyrics considered offensive to Spanish immigrants are omitted from future public performances of the Argentine National Anthem.
- May 14–October 28 - Argentina participates for the first time in the Olympic Games.
- June 8 - The Argentine Republic is officially declared free of plague.

== Births ==
=== April ===
- April 2 - Roberto Arlt, writer (died 1942)

=== June ===
- June 11 - Leopoldo Marechal, writer (died 1970)

=== July ===
- July 15 – Enrique Cadícamo, tango lyricist, poet and novelist (died 1999)

=== August ===
- August 4 - Arturo Umberto Illia, President of Argentina 1963–66 (died 1983)

=== October ===
- October 8 - Alfredo Carricaberry, footballer (died 1942)

=== December ===
- December 14 - Juan d'Arienzo, tango musician (died 1976)

== See also ==
- 1900 in Argentine football
