= 1899 in Argentina =

- Decades: 1870s; 1880s; 1890s; 1900s; 1910s
- See also: Other events of 1899; List of years in Argentina

== Incumbents ==
- President: Julio Argentino Roca

=== Governors ===
- Buenos Aires Province: Bernardo de Irigoyen
- Cordoba: Donaciano del Campillo
- Mendoza Province: Jacinto Álvarez

=== Vice Governors ===
- Buenos Aires Province: Alfredo Demarchi

== Born ==
- 23 July - Julio Irazusta, writer and politician (died 1982)
- 24 August - Jorge Luis Borges, short-story writer, essayist, poet and translator (died 1986)
- 16 November - Leonardo Castellani, priest, essayist, novelist, poet and theologian (died 1981)
- 11 December - Julio de Caro, tango musician, conductor and composer (died 1980)

== See also ==
- 1899 in Argentine football
