= Manuel Pizarro =

Manuel Pizarro may refer to:

- Manuel Esteban Pizarro (1805–1888), Argentinian political who was succeeded by Servando Bayo as senator for Santa Fe
- Manuel Pizarro Cenjor (1889–1954), deputy director of the Spanish Civil Guard during World War II
- Manuel Pizarro Moreno (born 1951), Spanish jurist and politician
- Manuel Pizarro (politician) (born 1964), Portuguese politician
- Manuel D. Pizarro (1841–1909), Argentinian revolutionary figure
