= 1966 in Argentina =

- Decades: 1940s; 1950s; 1960s; 1970s; 1980s
- See also: Other events of 1966; List of years in Argentina

Events from the year 1966 in Argentina.

== Incumbents ==
- President:
  - Arturo Umberto Illia (1 January - 28 June)
  - Juan Carlos Onganía (29 June - 31 December)
- Vice President:
  - Carlos Humberto Perette (1 January - 28 June)
  - Vacant (from 29 June)

=== Governors ===
- Buenos Aires Province:
  - until 28 June: Anselmo Marini
  - 28 June-5 July: Jorge Von Stecher
  - from 5 July: Francisco A. Imaz
- Cordoba: Justo Páez Molina (until 28 June)
- Chubut Province: Manuel Pío Raso then Carlos Arturo Vellegal then Gerardo Ojanguren then Rodolfo Varela
- Mendoza Province:
  - until 28 June: Francisco Gabrielli
  - 28 June-22 July: Tomás José Caballero
  - from 22 July: José Eugenio Blanco
- Santa Fe Province: Aldo Tessio (until 28 June); Carlos Sylvestre Begnis (from 28 June)

=== Vice Governors ===
- Buenos Aires Province: vacant

== Events ==
- 29 July – La Noche de los Bastones Largos

== Births ==
- 11 August – Juan María Solare, composer and pianist
- 18 August – Gustavo Charif, artist
- 24 August – Pablo Quirno, politician, Foreign Minister since 2025

== Deaths ==
- 26 December – Guillermo Stábile, footballer and manager (b. 1905)

== See also ==
- 1966 in Argentine football
- 1966 Argentine Primera División
- List of Argentine films of 1966
