= Roque Ferreyra =

Argentine politician

9th Governor of Córdoba
- In office 27 June 1855 – 26 June 1858
- Preceded by: Alejo del Carmen Guzmán
- Succeeded by: Mariano Fragueiro

13th Governor of Córdoba
- In office 28 June 1863 – 28 July 1863
- Preceded by: Benigno Ocampo
- Succeeded by: Mateo Luque

Personal details
- Born: 1810 Córdoba, Viceroyalty of the Rio de la Plata
- Died: 1885 (aged 74–75) Córdoba, Argentina
- Party: Unitarian
- Profession: Businessman

Roque Ferreyra (16 August 1810 – 13 September 1885) was an Argentine politician, twice Governor of Córdoba Province.

== Biography ==
Ferreyra was a member of the Federal Party and a prosperous businessman. He supported the revolution of 1840 against governor Manuel López and was arrested, but benefited from an amnesty and did not involve himself in politics until the fall of López in 1852.

From 1852 he was a provincial legislator and earned the respect of the provincial governor Alejo del Carmen Guzmán, becoming president of the legislature.

=== First term as governor ===
On 17 June 1855 he was elected Governor of Córdoba Province, assuming the post on 21 June. One of the first tasks he had to take was to maintain institutional order in the province in the midst of a civil war. On 16 August a new provincial constitution was approved, based on the constitutions of Mendoza Province and Chile. It was ratified by the Confederation's Congress on 19 September and instituted on 30 November 1855.

One important measure was the institution of a municipal reorganization in September 1856, augmenting the number of departments in the province to give the administration more efficiency in governing and managing, the Punilla Department was divided in two, giving origin to the Cruz del Eje Department (1856).

The following year local authorities were elected, and the Capital's municipal government was put in place on 9 July 1857, with its first president Juan Posse. On 3 January 1858 the Municipality of Río Cuarto was organized, with its new president Adolfo Ortiz.

Governor Ferreyra organized the civilian night guards corps in the provincial capital, and the first police force, separated from the army. He was preoccupied on the interior of the province and its affairs, travelling there on numerous occasions, leaving governmental control to his seconds Gumersindo Asúnsulo, José Alejo Román and Tomás Garzón.

Córdoba Province had big population growth during his tenure. The census of March 1857 showed a total of 137,079 inhabitants in the province, 26,540 more than in the 1852 census.

Reaching the end of his term as governor there were many disputes between the main political factions increasing daily to nominate a successor. On 23 May 1858, the provincial congress nominated Mariano Fragueiro as governor.

=== Provincial crisis ===
In the years that followed, he was one of the most prominent leaders of Córdoba's Unitarianism, along with Manuel D. Pizarro, Félix de la Peña and Justiniano Posse. With the fall or Fragueiro in 1860, victim of his double play of support and opposition to the federal government, Posse took control of the province, and tilted the government to a decided support of the policies of Buenos Aires. Even after the federal intervention of President Santiago Derqui, his group reached power with Posse, after the Battle of Pavón and the short tenure of Marcos Paz.

Ferreyra did not show himself in the forefront of local politics until Posse's resignation, in June 1863, victim of the confrontations between federals and Unitarians in the province. Córdoba's federalism was not finally defeated until the end of the 1860s; and then it did not disappear, but joined some other minority factions to form the National Autonomist Party, which would govern without opposition until 1916.

After Posse's resignation, the legislature elected his minister Benigno Ocampo in his place, which overtook Ferreyra by one vote.

=== Second term as governor ===
After a short while Ocampo also resigned, and Ferreyra was elected governor for the second time, counting with the support of the federals, which only asked in return, distancing from Posse. The latter made enemies with the governor, reelected temporarily in March. In February Ferreyra was victorious in stopping a federal revolution, and had pardoned the people responsible, with he hoped to obtain their political support.

In March 1865 there was a unitarian revolution instigated by Posse. It was quickly defeated and Posse was arrested and an officer who was not certain of final victory had him shot. As the opposition, and also the government accused Ferreyra of having caused Posse's death, he requested the visit of the federal Interior Minister, Guillermo Rawson, to testify for his innocence. Rawson instead asked for Ferreyra's resignation, not for considering guilty, but for thinking him a strong ally of president Mitre. Ferreyra refused to resign.

Soon after the Paraguayan War started and he sent several battalions to the front. While the unitarians had enlisted voluntarily, the opposition to the war by the federalists caused several units to rebel along the way to the front. The battalion that protected the government in the provincial capital also mutinied and refused to go to war. It was then dissolved and its soldiers forced to march with other units, some of them in chains.

In July 1866, the provincial army commander, Simón Luengo, led a revolution that deposed Ferreyra.

=== Last years ===
For more than a year, the federalists took power for the last time, but the differences between Luengo – future assassin of general Urquiza – and the governor Mateo Luque provoked the invasion of the province by federal troops, and at the end of 1867 the unitarians would return to power, with governor Félix de la Peña.

In his last years in politics, Ferreyra joined the Autonomist Party, which reached power with governor Enrique Rodríguez. Ferreyra, disenchanted with him, left politics altogether, and died in Córdoba in 1885.

== Bibliography ==
- Bischoff, Efraín (1989), Historia de Córdoba (in Spanish), Buenos Aires: Plus Ultra, ISBN 950-21-0106-5
- Zinny, Antonio (1987), Historia de los gobernadores de las Provincias Argentinas (in Spanish), Hyspamérica, ISBN 950-614-685-3

Political offices
Preceded by Alejo del Carmen Guzmán	Governor of Córdoba; 1855-1858	Succeeded by Mariano Fragueiro
Preceded by Benigno Ocampo	Governor of Córdoba; 1863-1866	Succeeded by José Mateo Luque
