= Mario Negri =

Argentine politician and lawyer

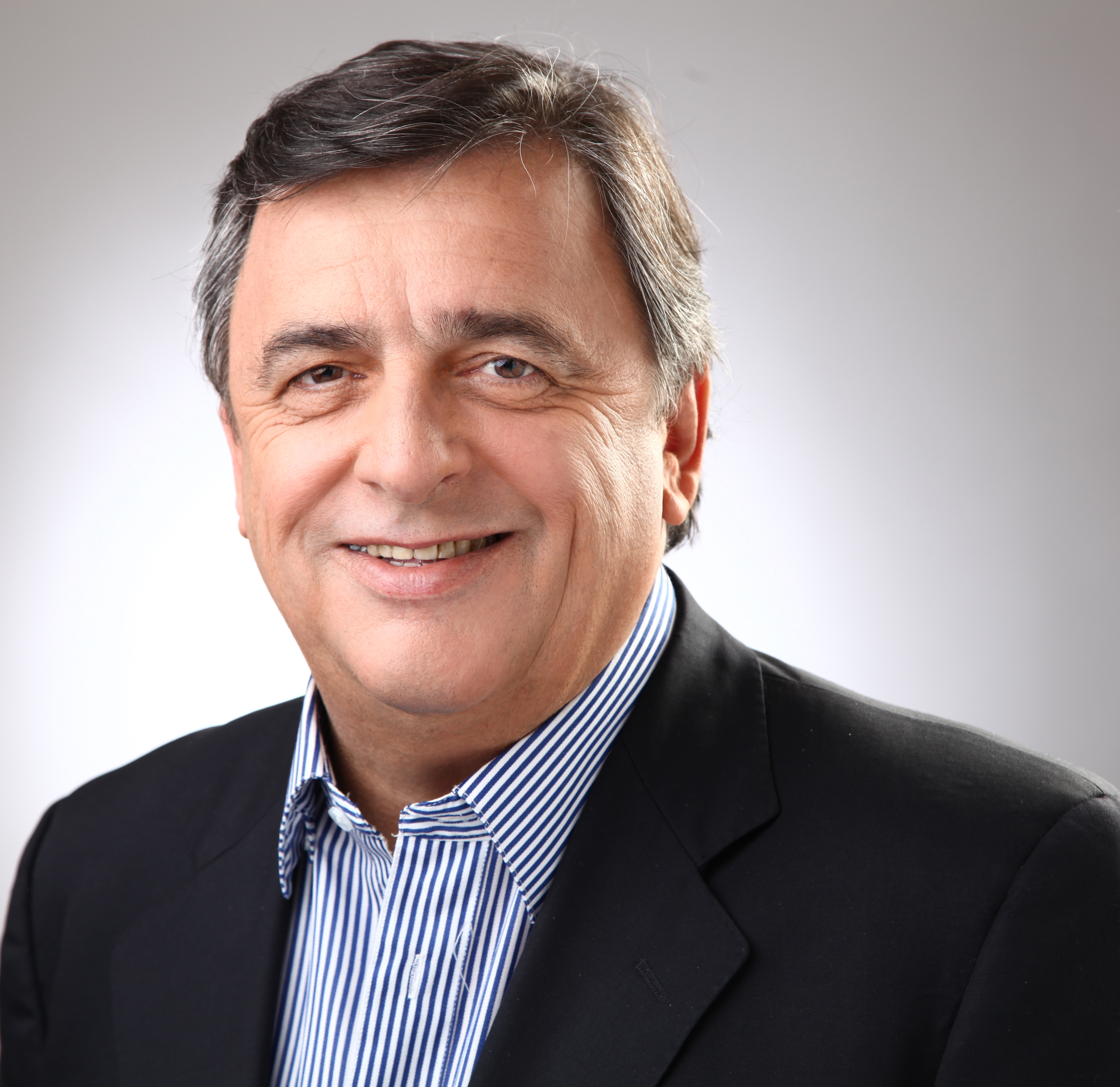

National Deputy
- In office 10 December 2011 – 10 December 2023
- Constituency: Córdoba

Councillor of Magistracy
- In office 6 December 2017 – 10 November 2018
- Appointed by: Chamber of Deputies
- In office 10 December 2003 – 10 December 2007
- Constituency: Córdoba
- In office 10 December 1993 – 10 December 2001
- Constituency: Córdoba

Vice Governor of Córdoba
- In office 10 December 1987 – 10 December 1991
- Governor: Eduardo Angeloz
- Preceded by: Edgardo Grosso
- Succeeded by: Edgardo Grosso

Provincial Deputy of Córdoba
- In office 10 December 1983 – 10 December 1987

Personal details
- Born: 6 February 1954 (age 72) Lucas González, Entre Ríos Province, Argentina
- Party: Radical Civic Union
- Other political affiliations: Juntos por el Cambio (since 2015)
- Spouse: María Angélica Biasutti
- Children: Constanza Negri, Juan Hipólito Negri, Eugenia Negri, Candelaria Negri
- Education: National University of Córdoba
- Occupation: Lawyer
- Website: marionegri.com.ar

Mario Raúl Negri (born 6 February 1954) is an Argentine Radical Civic Union (UCR) politician and lawyer. He was a National Deputy for Córdoba Province from 2011 to 2023, leading the UCR parliamentary bloc during most of his tenure. In addition, he was a member of the Council of Magistracy appointed by the Chamber of Deputies from 2017 to 2018.

Negri has previously served as vice governor and provincial legislator of Córdoba.

== Early life and education ==
Mario Negri was born and lived all along his childhood in Lucas González, department of Nogoyá in Entre Ríos province. He is the third of six siblings. His father, Noé Santiago Negri, worked in the oil industry and his mother Elisabeth Sobrón was a teacher.

In 1973 he moved to the City of Córdoba to study Laws the National University of Córdoba (UNC). He had graduated in 1979. During this period he started to be active in Franja Morada, the university leg of the Radical Civic Union (UCR). He was de President of the Student's Union and was a member of the national council of Franja Morada. He was also a member of the Renovation and Change Movement in Córdoba Province, an internal group of the Radical Party founded by former Argentine President Raúl Alfonsín in 1972.

== Political career ==
Within the UCR he occupied many positions. He was the President of the Radical Youth (the youth association of the Radical Civic Union) in Córdoba Province (1983–1985), Vice President of the Provincial Committee of the UCR (1987–1989) and during the 1990s he was the secretary of the executive board of the National UCR and member of the National Committee of the party. Between 2006 and 2009 he became the President of the Party in Córdoba. He also was the secretary of coordination of the National Committee until December 2012.

After the restoration of democracy in Argentina Mario Negri he performed as Provincial Deputy (1983–1987). During that period he led the Commission of Constitutional Affairs at the Legislature of Córdoba Province. He was the Lieutenant governor of Córdoba Province between 1987 and 1991 during the second mandate of Eduardo César Angeloz (1983–1995). In 1989 he became acting Governor of the Province while Angeloz was promoting his presidential campaign. Additionally, in 1991 he was a potential candidate to be the mayor of Córdoba City and in 1999 he was indeed the candidate in representation of the UCR. In 2007 he was one of the candidates to rule the province.

Mario Negri is now National Deputy of Argentina and since December 2013 has been the leader of the UCR deputies at the Chamber of Deputies. He has also led the deputies of Cambiemos coalition since 2016. It is his fifth term as Deputy. The first one was between 1993 and 1997 and he was reelected until 2001. Then, he was chosen again for the periods 2003–2007 and 2011–2015. Between 2011 and 2013 he was the Second Vice President of the Chamber of Deputies, while between 1999 and 2001 was the General Secretary of the Congressmen of the UCR.

=== Parliamentary labour ===
During his different periods as National Deputy, que proposed several bills such as the increase of the Fund of Teachers Encouragement to national universities, the regime of invalidity or nullity of the proceedings made under the breach of the constitutional guarantees, the creation of the Federal Council of Mercosur, the recovery and restoration of the building of Hospital de Clínicas in the city of Córdoba that was declared Historic National Heritage, the regime of the incorporation of international norms to Argentine legal system, a system to reference fiduciary funds with funds of the State to de National Budget, the derogation of the articles 127 and 133 of the Electoral Code which regulates sanctions to civil servants during national elections, the creation of a Permanent Bicameral Commission to control the policies around the recovery of the national sovereignty of Malvinas Islands, the amendment to the Criminal Code about the stoppage of the trial in case of gender violence, the derogation of Law 26.843 that gave approval to the Memorandum of understanding between Argentina and Iran about the AMIA bombing, changes in the National Program of Witnesses and Suspects Protection, and a new regime of antitrust legislation, among others.

As head of deputies of the Cambiemos coalition, he was part of the delegation that took part of the 2018 edition of the Organisation for Economic Co-operation and Development (OECD) forum in Paris, where France's President Emmanuel Macron was one of the speakers. At OECD he had met Secretary General José Ángel Gurría to ask for Argentina's admission to that organization.

=== Captured by state terrorism ===
As an active member of Franja Morada, Negri was illegally captured by para-policial forces a couple of months before the coup d'état of 24 March 1976. The detention happened at midnight on 3 December 1975 when the forces broke into the apartment that he had rented with his brothers at the Maipú neighbourhood on the South East of Córdoba City. They forced him to get in a vehicle of the Army, his eyes covered and took him to the Boureau Department of the Police.

=== Chopper accident ===
In the dawn of 11 December 1988, Mario Negri, as Lieutenant governor of Córdoba province, was returning to the Capital in an Agusta chopper from the city of Hernando, located at 150 kilometres from Córdoba City. He had taken part of the National Peanut Party.

According to witnesses, once the chopper had reached 500 m of height, it fell down in the meadows. The cause of the accident was the strong wind. Allegedly, the engines of the helicopter got stuck and the pilot was unable to avoid the fall.

Negri was traveling with his private assistant Pascual Scarpino, the news manager of Argentina Televisora Color Jorge Neder, the pilot Máximo Rodríguez and the copilot Héctor Alberto Tessio. Scarpino, Rodríguez and Tessio died, while Negri suffered several injuries and 39 fractures, which forced him to remain in hospital for some months while being operated on a number of occasions. Neder was unharmed.

=== Awards and recognitions ===
Mario Negri was chosen by El Parlamentario magazine as the most distinguished deputy of 2015 and 2017. He was chosen by other deputies, senators, journalists and consultants of the Congress.

In 2014 the same magazine distinguished Negri as the deputy who spoke the most at the Chamber.
