= Lucas González =

Lucas González may refer to:

- Lucas González, Argentina, a village and municipality in Entre Ríos Province in north-eastern Argentina
- Lucas González (football manager) (born 1981), Colombian football manager
- Lucas González (footballer, born 1997), Argentine forward
- Lucas González (footballer, born 2000), Argentine midfielder
- Lucas González Amorosino, Argentine rugby union player
- Lucas Gonzalez (born 1988), Brazilian politician
