= Alejo Carmen Guzmán =

Argentine politician

15.° Governor of Córdoba
- In office 24 April 1852 – 27 June 1855
- Preceded by: Manuel López
- Succeeded by: Roque Ferreyra

Personal details
- Born: 1815 Córdoba, Viceroyalty of the Río de la Plata
- Died: 1884 (aged 68–69) Córdoba, Argentina
- Party: Federal
- Profession: Lawyer

Alejo del Carmen Guzmán (1815 in Córdoba – 1884 in Córdoba), was a lawyer and politician from Argentina and governor of Córdoba Province.

He was a member of the Federal Party in his province during the administration of Manuel López. When news of the Battle of Caseros arrived, the governor named him General Minister.

When the revolution of April 1852 started, he was named governor by the leaders of the rebellion, but he did not rely on them as much as he relied on the more numerous Federals. When General José María Paz, at the end of that year marched to Córdoba to form a Unitarian Party in the interior of the country, he sent advance parties and announced he would arrest the previous governor (Lopez).

Guzman supported the policies of president Urquiza.

He left office in June 1855 to Roque Ferreyra, but continued being head of the Federal Party in the province. He was a Representative to Congress and later Senator. He became a Representative to Congress again after the Battle of Pavón, and lead the Federal Party. He was later Dean of the National University of Córdoba for several years and director of a Catholic group during the presidency of Julio Argentino Roca.

== Bibliography ==
- Bischoff, Efraín (1989), Historia de Córdoba (in Spanish), Buenos Aires: Plus Ultra, ISBN 950-21-0106-5
- Zinny, Antonio (1987), Historia de los gobernadores de las Provincias Argentinas (in Spanish), Hyspamérica, ISBN 950-614-685-3

Political offices
Preceded by José Victorio López	Governor of Córdoba; 1852–1855	Succeeded by Roque Ferreyra
