= José Uriburu =

José Uriburu may refer to:

- José Evaristo Uriburu, President of Argentina from 1895 to 1898
- José Félix Uriburu, President of Argentina 1930–32, nephew of José Evaristo
- José C. Uriburu, interventor of the Argentine province of Córdoba
