= Adolfo Sigwald =

Argentine politician

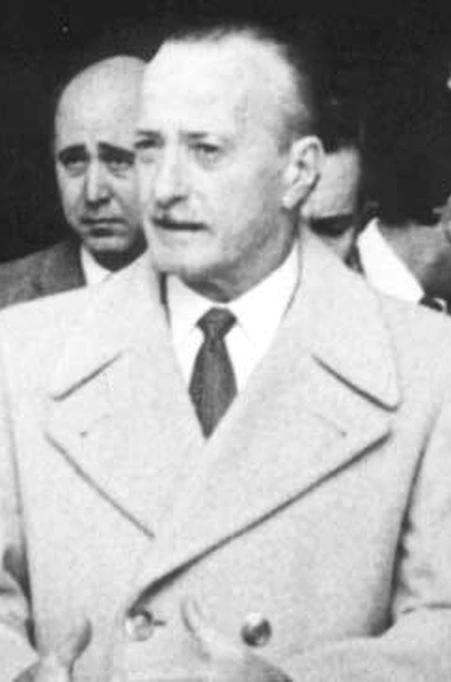

53rd Governor of Córdoba
- In office March 8, 1979 – January 20, 1982
- Preceded by: Miguel Marini
- Succeeded by: Rubén Pellanda

Personal details
- Born: October 27, 1923 San Vicente, Provincia de Córdoba, Argentina
- Died: March 22, 1999 (aged 75) Buenos Aires, Argentina
- Party: None
- Profession: Soldier

General Adolfo Sigwald (October 27, 1923 – March 22, 1999) was de facto Governor of Córdoba, Argentina from March 8, 1979, to January 20, 1982.

Political offices
Preceded by Miguel Marini	de facto Governor of Córdoba; 1979–1982	Succeeded by Rubén Pellanda
