= Amadeo Sabattini =

Argentine politician

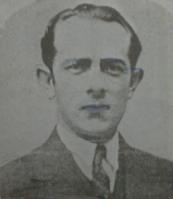
- Governor Amadeo Sabattini

45th Governor of Córdoba
- In office 17 May 1936 – 17 May 1940
- Governor of Córdoba|Lieutenant: Alejandro Gallardo
- Preceded by: Luis Funes
- Succeeded by: Santiago del Castillo

Personal details
- Born: May 29, 1892; Buenos Aires
- Died: February 29, 1960 (aged 67); Villa María
- Political party: Radical
- Profession: Physician

Amadeo Tomás Sabattini (May 29, 1892 – February 29, 1960) was an Argentine politician. He served as Governor of Córdoba from May 17, 1936, to May 17, 1940.

Sabattini was born in Buenos Aires to immigrant parents: His mother was Uruguayan, while his father was an Italian man from the Piedmont region. Sabattini enrolled at the National University of Córdoba and graduated with a Medical Degree in 1919, becoming affiliated to the centrist Radical Civic Union (UCR) – the party in power in Argentina at the time. A staunch opponent of the 1930 coup d'état that unseated populist UCR President Hipólito Yrigoyen, Sabattini went underground and participated in numerous protests, some violent, before an agreement between Conservative President Agustín Justo and the leader of the UCR, former President Marcelo Torcuato de Alvear, resulted in the lifting of a UCR electoral boycott in effect since the fraud-ridden 1931 elections. In this framework, Sabattini was elected Governor of the important Province of Córdoba in 1936.

A supporter of much of President Yrigoyen's 1916 platform, including liberalization of the universities and the establishment of State enterprises, Sabattini initiated several hydroelectric dams and supported the creation of numerous industrial zones in his then-agrarian province. He extended assistance to his province's needy and to small business, while prosecuting hitherto rampant graft and limiting the Catholic Church's input in school curricula, earning him the enmity of that influential institution.

The Governor retired to his modest home in Villa María and in 1940, though he was ineligible for reelection per the provincial constitution, his UCR was returned to power that year, electing Governor Santiago del Castillo. Sabattini's electoral and judicial reforms, as well as Córdoba Province conservatives' unwillingness to participate in the prevailing system of "patriotic fraud," prevented the nation's ruling party (the Concordance) from seizing the Governorship.

Sabattini became a supporter of many of the social reforms advanced by Labor Minister Juan Perón, following a coup d'état against the conservatives in 1943. Perón offered Sabattini the Vice-Presidential slot on his Labor Party ticket, ahead of the February 1946 elections. The popular Córdoba lawmaker declined, however, instead creating a "Intransigent and Renewal Movement", opposing to president Perón but also to the right wing of Radical Party. Around 1952 he began a pragmatic alliance with other opposing groups, after the increasingly autocratic Perón's seizure of a number of critical newspapers and his detention of prominent opponents. This will lead to a coup of 1955. Following this, Sabattini allied himself with the moderately conservative Ricardo Balbín, whose mainstream UCR (the UCR-P) was defeated by the splinter UCRI's Arturo Frondizi when the exiled Perón endorsed him ahead of the February 1958 elections.

Living in solitude and nearly penniless, Sabattini died in Villa María in 1960, at age 67.

Political offices
Preceded by Luis Funes	Governor of Córdoba; 1936–1940	Succeeded by Santiago del Castillo
