= Miguel A. Ferrer Deheza =

Argentine politician

Miguel Ángel Ferrer Deheza

de facto Federal Interventor of Córdoba
- In office 27 July 1966 – 13 September 1966
- Preceded by: Gustavo Martínez Zuviría
- Succeeded by: Carlos Caballero

Personal details
- Born: April 23, 1915; Córdoba
- Died: June 21, 1989 (aged 74)
- Political party: None
- Profession: Lawyer

Miguel Ángel Ferrer Deheza (April 23, 1915 – June 21, 1989) was de facto Federal Interventor of Córdoba, Argentina, from July 27, 1966 to September 13, 1966.

Political offices
Preceded by Gustavo Martínez Zuviría	de facto Federal Interventor of Córdoba; 1966-1966	Succeeded by Carlos Caballero
