= Rubén Pellanda =

Argentine politician

de facto Federal Interventor of Córdoba
- In office January 20, 1982 – December 11, 1983
- Preceded by: Adolfo Sigwald
- Succeeded by: Eduardo Angeloz

Personal details
- Born: August 28, 1928
- Died: December 1, 2012 (aged 84)
- Political party: None
- Profession: Doctor

Rubén Juan Pellanda (26 August 1928 – 1 December 2012) was de facto Federal Interventor of Córdoba, Argentina from January 20, 1982 to December 11, 1983.

Political offices
Preceded by Adolfo Sigwald	de facto Federal Interventor of Córdoba; 1982-1983	Succeeded by Eduardo Angeloz
