= Bernardo Bas =

Argentine politician

de facto Federal Interventor of Córdoba
- In office 17 June 1970 – 25 February 1971
- Preceded by: Juan Carlos Reyes
- Succeeded by: Carlos Gigena Parker

Personal details
- Born: October 22, 1919 Córdoba, Argentina
- Died: March 2, 1991 (aged 71)
- Political party: None
- Profession: Lawyer

Bernardo Alejandro Bas (22 October 1919 – 2 March 1991) was de facto Federal Interventor of Córdoba, Argentina from 17 June 1970, to 25 February 1971.

Political offices
Preceded by Juan Carlos Reyes	de facto Federal Interventor of Córdoba; 1970-1971	Succeeded by Carlos Gigena Parker
