= Roberto Huerta =

Argentine politician

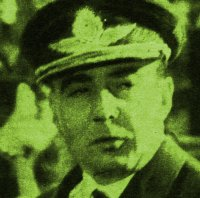
- Brigadier Roberto Huerta

de facto Federal Interventor of Córdoba
- In office 5 July 1969 – 9 April 1970
- Preceded by: Jorge Carcagno
- Succeeded by: Juan Carlos Reyes

Personal details
- Born: April 7, 1917; Banfield, Buenos Aires, Argentina
- Died: January 17, 2003 (aged 85)
- Political party: None
- Profession: Soldier

Roberto Huerta (7 April 1917 – 17 January 2003) was de facto Federal Interventor of Córdoba, Argentina from July 5, 1969 to April 9, 1970.

Political offices
Preceded by Jorge Carcagno	de facto Federal Interventor of Córdoba; 1969 - 1970	Succeeded by Juan Carlos Reyes
