= Ramón Mestre =

Argentine politician (1937–2003)

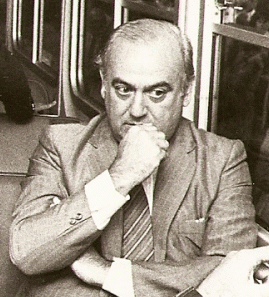

Minister of the Interior
- In office March 20, 2001 – December 21, 2001
- President: Fernando de la Rúa
- Preceded by: Federico Storani
- Succeeded by: Miguel Ángel Toma

Federal Interventor of Corrientes
- In office December 17, 1999 – March 20, 2001
- Preceded by: Hugo Perié
- Succeeded by: Oscar Aguad

55th Governor of Córdoba
- In office July 12, 1995 – July 12, 1999
- Vice Governor: Luis Molinari Romero
- Preceded by: Eduardo Angeloz
- Succeeded by: José Manuel De la Sota

Mayor of Córdoba
- In office December 10, 1983 – December 10, 1991
- Preceded by: Eduardo Cafferatta
- Succeeded by: Rubén Marti

Personal details
- Born: August 21, 1937 San Juan, San Juan Province, Argentina
- Died: March 6, 2003 (aged 65) Córdoba, Córdoba Province, Argentina
- Party: Radical Civic Union
- Spouse: Cristina Sueldo
- Profession: Dentist

Ramón Bautista Mestre (August 21, 1937 – March 6, 2003), an Argentine politician, was Governor of Córdoba from July 12, 1995, to July 12, 1999. He also served as Federal Interventor of Corrientes Province (December 16, 1999, to March 20, 2001), Minister of the Interior (from March 20, 2001, to December 21, 2001), and Mayor of the City of Córdoba (from December 1983 to December 1991).

== Biography ==
Mestre was born in San Juan, Argentina. He enrolled at the National University of Córdoba School of Dentistry, and was elected President of the Student Union Organization. A member of the centrist Radical Civic Union (Unión Cívica Radical, or UCR) and protégé of Córdoba Governor Justo Páez Molina, Mestre began his political career as Deputy Health Secretary (1964) for Governor Páez Molina, and later as the Governor’s Chief of Staff (1965). Following the 1966 military coup d'état that overthrew President Arturo Illia, as well as Paez Molina and all other governors, he worked as a dentist in the private field. He married the former Cristina Sueldo, and they had four children. was elected to the Argentine Chamber of Deputies for Córdoba Province in 1973, and became leader of the UCR caucus until the March 1976 coup.

=== Career ===
In 1983, he was elected Mayor of Córdoba for the 1983–87 period, and was reelected for a new period from 1987 to 1991. His administration completed numerous public works, notably the restoration of the Suquía River shore along the city. He then created his own organization in the UCR, Participación y Renovación, to challenge Eduardo Angeloz in the latter's 1991 bid for a third term as governor. Mestre lost the primaries; but he established a name as a natural candidate for the 1995 elections.

In 1994, he was elected to the National Convention that would approve extensive Constitutional amendments. In 1995, he was elected Governor of Córdoba. During his brief tenure, Mestre advanced a regional alliance with the governors of Entre Ríos and Santa Fe Provinces that became the "Center Region." Mestre hoped to accelerate growth in Córdoba; but the province struggled under the nation's economic downturn, and added to suspicions of corruption among Mestre appointees, the high fiscal deficit, as well as his own, unaccommodating style of governing, his administration quickly became unpopular. He failed to win reelection in 1999, and the Justicialist Party won the Córdoba governorship for the first time, electing José Manuel De la Sota as the 56th Governor.

In 1999 until 2001, Mestre served as Federal Interventor in Corrientes Province, and was appointed Minister of the Interior during 2001. As the Interior Ministry oversaw law enforcement at the time, Mestre bore much of the responsibility in the repression of demonstrators at the Plaza de Mayo during the December 2001 riots that resulted in several deaths, and precipitated the fall of the President Fernando de la Rúa.

=== Death ===
Mestre announced his candidacy for Governor of Córdoba, but died in 2003, as a result of hepatitis.

Political offices
Preceded by Eduardo Angeloz	Governor of Córdoba; 1995–1999	Succeeded by José Manuel De la Sota
Preceded by Miguel Ángel Toma	Minister of the Interior; 2001	Succeeded by Federico Storani
