= Gustavo Martínez Zuviría =

Argentine politician

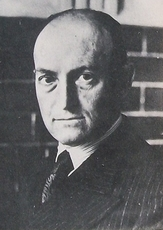

de facto Federal Interventor of Córdoba
- In office 28 June 1966 – 27 July 1966
- Preceded by: Justo Páez Molina
- Succeeded by: Miguel A. Ferrer Deheza

Personal details
- Born: December 28, 1915; Santa Fe, Argentina
- Died: April 27, 1991 (aged 75); Buenos Aires, Argentina
- Political party: None
- Profession: Military

Gustavo Martínez Zuviría (28 December 1915 – 27 April 1991) was de facto Federal Interventor of Córdoba, Argentina from June 28, 1966 to July 27, 1966.

Political offices
Preceded by Justo Páez Molina	de facto Federal Interventor of Córdoba; 1966	Succeeded by Miguel A. Ferrer Deheza
