= Miguel Marini =

Argentine politician

52nd Governor of Córdoba
- In office 2 February 1979 – 8 March 1979
- Preceded by: Carlos Chasseing
- Succeeded by: Adolfo Sigwald

Personal details
- Born: 1927
- Party: None
- Profession: Soldier

Miguel Angel Marini (born 1927) was de facto Governor of Córdoba, Argentina from 2 February 1979 to 8 March 1979.

Political offices
Preceded by Carlos Chasseing	Governor of Córdoba; 1979	Succeeded by Adolfo Sigwald
