= Helvio Guozden =

Argentine politician (1914–1983)

de facto Federal Interventor of Córdoba
- In office 22 March 1971 – 25 May 1973
- Preceded by: José C. Uriburu
- Succeeded by: Ricardo Obregón Cano

Personal details
- Born: 2 January 1914; Buenos Aires
- Died: 19 July 1983 (aged 69)
- Political party: None
- Profession: Military

Helvio Nicolás Guozden (2 January 1914 – 19 July 1983) was an Argentine politician who served as the de facto Federal Interventor of Córdoba from March 22, 1971 to May 25, 1973.

Political offices
Preceded by José C. Uriburu	de facto Federal Interventor of Córdoba; 1971-1973	Succeeded by Ricardo Obregón Cano
