= José Francisco Álvarez =

Argentine lawyer, military man and politician

Governor of the Province of Córdoba, Argentina
- In office October 10, 1840 – December 19, 1840
- Preceded by: Manuel López
- Succeeded by: Manuel López
- Constituency: Córdoba Province

Personal details
- Born: July 17, 1808 Spain, Córdoba Virreinato del Río de la Plata
- Died: August 22, 1841 (aged 33) Argentina, Ciudad de San Juan
- Citizenship: Argentine
- Party: Federal Party
- Spouse: Mercedes Allende Goicoechea
- Occupation: Lawyer

José Francisco Álvarez (1796–1841) was an Argentine lawyer, military and politician who served briefly as governor of the province of Córdoba. He was born in Córdoba, in the Viceroyalty of Rio de la Plata, and died in San Juan, Argentina on August 22, 1841.

== Biography ==
Álvarez was the son of Francisco Javier Álvarez, a trader based in Córdoba but who was a native of Santiago de Casardeita, Galicia, Spain, and Doña Francisca Carlota de las Casas y Pabon. He married Mercedes Allende Goycoechea in 1838. She was the daughter of the influential Jose Norberto de Allende. Álvarez studied law in his hometown and became a lawyer at the University of San Carlos.

In 1814 he joined the Northern Army, with which he participated in the third auxiliary expedition to Upper Peru. He fought in the Battle of Sipe-Sipe, where he was taken prisoner. He managed to escape and return to Córdoba. He later participated in the war against the federal province of Santa Fe and participated in the Arequito mutiny.

For many years he was Member of parliament for Córdoba, as a member of the federal party.

== Military career ==
In 1839, under the government of Manuel Lopez, alias Quebracho, he became president of the Córdoba legislature. He secretly joined the local branch - of the May Association, which was composed mostly of young romantics, dedicated to fighting what they deemed to be the excessive influence of the governor of the province of Buenos Aires, Juan Manuel de Rosas, and Lopez.

In October 1840, the Coalition forces in the North, under General Lamadrid invaded Córdoba from the northwest, while Juan Lavalle was heading there from Santa Fe to avoid being caught between two fronts. Lopez went to the province Southeast, where he thought he would meet the federal army of Manuel Oribe. Taking advantage of his absence and the proximity of Lamadrid, the unit organized a coup and deposed officials and federal legislators. The incoming government named Alvarez incumbent governor. He appointed Colonel Jose Julian Martinez as his minister.

The day after the revolution Lamadrid arrived to Córdoba, and Alvarez was appointed commander of the provincial army. But this army was greatly diminished because most of the provincial forces had accompanied Lopez. On the other hand, the commanders who were sufficiently far from the capital's government ignored Alvarez.

Alvarez did not have time to govern. He just managed to start levying a compulsory contribution from the federals and confiscated some of Lopez's assets, and also withdrew the delegation of foreign relations in Rosas. He served the government for just over two months, but his attention was focused on war. He had to ask for help from the other provinces, since the entire war front was in the province of Córdoba.

In early December news came of the virtual destruction of the Lavalle army in the Battle of Quebracho Herrado, and the defeated soldiers caused all kinds of disorders. So Alvarez delegated the government to Lamadrid. Lamadrid decided, according to Lavalle, but without consulting Alvarez, to retreat with his armies to Tucumán and La Rioja, respectively. Alvarez decided not to stay in the Oribe province and went in the Lavalle army. A little later, discouraged by the turmoil he saw in it, he went to Lamadrid, whom he accompanied to Tucuman.

== San Juan battle ==
Álvarez participated in the Lamadrid campaign to San Juan, in the vanguard under General Mariano Acha. He fought in the bloody Battle of Angaco, which was a surprising victory over the far superior army led by Mendozan warlord José Félix Aldao.

Unfortunately Álvarez accompanied Acha in turning to celebrate the victory, just at a time when the San Juan Governor, Nazario Benavídez had reorganized his army on the outskirts of San Juan. On August 18, Benavidez suddenly attacked the city in the Battle of La Chacarilla taking Acha's army by surprise. However, the unit tried to hold out against an army far superior without trenches or defenses. Álvarez led a bayonet and gun attack by one of the main streets, and was shattered by a cannon shot.

A few hours later, Acha surrendered and his entire army disappeared into the hands of the governor Benavidez.

== Bibliography ==
- Bischoff, Efraín, Historia de Córdoba, Ed. Plus Ultra, Bs. As., 1989. ISBN 950-21-0106-5
- Zinny, Antonio, Historia de los gobernadores de las Provincias Argentinas, Ed, Hyspamérica, 1987. ISBN 950-614-685-3
- Quesada, Ernesto, Lavalle y la batalla de Quebracho Herrado, Ed. Plus Ultra, Bs. As., 1965.
- Quesada, Ernesto, Acha y la batalla de Angaco, Ed. Plus Ultra, Bs. As., 1965.
- Academia Nacional de la Historia, Partes de batalla de las guerras civiles, Bs. As., 1977.
