= 1967 in Argentina =

- Decades: 1940s; 1950s; 1960s; 1970s; 1980s
- See also: Other events of 1967; List of years in Argentina

Events from the year 1967 in Argentina.

== Incumbents ==
- President: Juan Carlos Onganía
- Vice President: Vacant

=== Governors ===
- Buenos Aires Province: Francisco A. Imaz
- Chubut Province: Rodolfo Varela then Osvaldo Guaita
- Mendoza Province: José Eugenio Blanco

=== Vice Governors ===
- Buenos Aires Province: vacant

== Births ==
=== March ===
- 6 March - Julio Bocca, ballet dancer

== Deaths ==
=== October ===
- 19 October - Che Guevara, Marxist revolutionary (executed) (b. 1928)

== See also ==
- 1967 Argentine Primera División
- List of Argentine films of 1967
