= Carlos Chasseing =

Argentine politician (1926–2018)

de facto Federal Interventor of Córdoba
- In office 12 April 1976 – 2 February 1979
- Preceded by: José Vaquero
- Succeeded by: Miguel Marini

Personal details
- Born: 25 September 1926
- Died: 16 April 2018 (aged 91)
- Political party: None
- Profession: Soldier

Carlos Bernardo Chasseing (25 September 1926 – 16 April 2018) was de facto Federal Interventor of Córdoba, Argentina from April 12, 1976 to February 2, 1979.

Political offices
| Preceded by José Vaquero | de facto Federal Interventor of Córdoba; 1976-1979 | Succeeded by Miguel Marini |
