= Carlos José Caballero =

Argentine politician

Carlos Caballero

de facto Federal Interventor of Córdoba
- In office 13 September 1966 – 16 June 1969
- Preceded by: Miguel A. Ferrer Deheza
- Succeeded by: Jorge Carcagno

Personal details
- Born: September 13, 1917; Córdoba, Argentina
- Died: October 2, 1981 (aged 64)
- Political party: None
- Profession: Lawyer

Carlos José Caballero (13 September 1917 – 2 October 1981) was de facto Federal Interventor of Córdoba, Argentina from 13 September 1966 to 16 June 1969.

Political offices
| Preceded by Miguel A. Ferrer Deheza | de facto Federal Interventor of Córdoba; 1966-1969 | Succeeded by Jorge Carcagno |
