= Luciano Benjamín Menéndez =

Argentine Army General involved in the Falklands War and the Dirty War

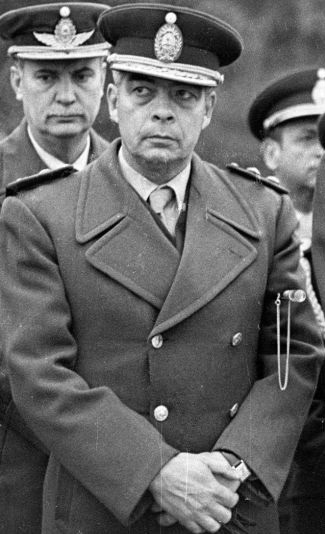

Provisional Federal Interventor of Córdoba
- In office 19 September – 20 September 1975
- Preceded by: Raúl Lacabanne
- Succeeded by: Raúl Bercovich Rodríguez

Personal details
- Born: 19 June 1927 San Martín, Buenos Aires, Argentina
- Died: 27 February 2018 (aged 90) Córdoba, Argentina
- Profession: Military officer

Military service
- Allegiance: Argentine Army

Luciano Benjamín Menéndez (19 June 1927 – 27 February 2018) was an Argentine general and convicted human rights violator and murderer. Commander of the Third Army Corps (1975–79), he played a prominent role in the murders of social activists.

== Biography ==
Menéndez was born in the largely working-class Buenos Aires suburb of San Martín, in 1927. He enrolled in the National War College and was later transferred to Córdoba, where he was attached to the III Army Corps; the jurisdiction of the Third Army Corps comprises the provinces of Córdoba, Jujuy, Salta, Catamarca, La Rioja, San Juan, Mendoza, San Luis, Córdoba, Santiago del Estero, and Tucumán (Northwestern and Cuyo regions).

=== Repression and genocide ===
As head of the III Army Corps, Menéndez supervised the operations of the 5th Mountain Infantry Brigade during Operativo Independencia against Marxist People's Revolutionary Army (Argentina) (Ejército Revolucionario del Pueblo, ERP) guerrillas in Tucumán Province. The Baltimore Sun reported at the time, "In the jungle-covered mountains of Tucuman, long known as "Argentina's garden," Argentines are fighting Argentines in a Vietnam-style civil war. So far, the outcome is in doubt. But there is no doubt about the seriousness of the combat, which involves 2,000 or so leftist guerrillas and perhaps as many as 10,000 soldiers."

During last week of August 1975 he was instrumental in putting down the ERP-led armed uprising in the city of Córdoba aimed at stopping the deployment of the elite Córdoba based 4th Airborne Infantry Brigade in Tucumán province that resulted in the deaths of at least 5 policemen and practically the whole of the parachute brigade was called in to restore order and stand guard at strategic points around the city of Córdoba for the remainder of the year, after the bombing of the Córdoba city police headquarters and radio communications centre. In all, 293 servicemen and policemen were killed combating left wing terrorism between 1975 and 1976.

He ordered mass arrests of hundreds of trade union members, students, teachers, journalists and anyone else suspected of collaborating with left-wing guerrillas. Menendez summed up his feelings on the anti-guerrilla operations:

"We have to act drastically. Operacion Independencia can't just consist of a roundup of political prisoners, because the army can't risk the lives of its men and lay its prestige on the line simply to act as a kind of police force that ends up by turning over X-number of political prisoners to some timorous judge... who will apply lenient punishment which in turn will be cancelled out by amnesties granted by ambitious politicians courting popularity. We're at war, and war obeys another law: he who wipes out the other side wins."

Justice Minister Ricardo Gil Lavedra, who formed part of the 1985 tribunal judging the military crimes committed during the Dirty War would later go on record saying that "I sincerely believe that the majority of the victims of the illegal repression were guerrilla militants".

He was briefly Federal Interventor (Receiver) of the important Province of Córdoba in 1975, and served as the Commander of the Third Army Corps from September 1975 until September 1979. He was known for his aggressive and vulgar discourse against Chileans:

«Si nos dejan atacar a los chilotes, los corremos hasta la isla de Pascua, el brindis de fin de año lo hacemos en el Palacio La Moneda y después iremos a mear el champagne en el Pacífico» (Translation: «If they let us attack the Chileans, we'll chase them to Easter Island, we'll drink the New Year's Eve toast in the Palacio de La Moneda, and then we'll piss the champagne into the Pacific»).

At the end of 1979 Major-General Menéndez was sacked as commander of the Cordoba-based Third Army Corps after a dispute over tactics against guerrillas. Menéndez said Lieutenant-General Roberto Eduardo Viola, the army chief, had failed to end left-wing subversion. Menéndez's nephew, Mario Benjamín Menéndez, was the Commander of the Argentine troops during the 1982 Falklands War, and was the islands' military governor during the brief occupation.

=== Indictment ===
After the dictatorship ended in 1983, Menéndez (as a top officer) fell outside the purview of the Ley de Obediencia Debida ("Law of Due Obedience") and was accused of nearly 800 crimes. In 1988 he was indicted with 47 homicides, 76 instances of torture (4 of them followed by death) and 4 kidnappings of minors, but the Supreme Court voided most of the indictments as a result of the Ley de Punto Final ("Full Stop Law").

In 1990, days before his trial was to begin for the remaining accusations, President Carlos Menem pardoned him as well as more than 60 left-wing guerrillas. In a televised address to the nation, Menem said, "I have signed the decrees so we may begin to rebuild the country in peace, in liberty and in justice ... We come from long and cruel confrontations. There was a wound to heal." Lieutenant-General Félix Martín Bonnet, commander of the Argentine Army at the time, welcomed the pardons as an "inspiration of the armed forces, not only because those who had been their commanders were deprived of their freedom, but because many of their present members fought, and did so, in fulfillment of express orders." In 1998 he assembled party, Nuevo Orden Republicano.

Menéndez was involved in the forced disappearance of several Italian citizens, and was indicted in Spain, from where judge Baltasar Garzón asked the Argentine authorities for his arrest. In 1998 a case involving 30 summary executions and murders of political prisoners was reopened against Menéndez, who was detained for a few days and refused to give a statement; he was later set free again.

=== Conviction ===
The laws that had stopped the prosecution of crimes committed during the dictatorship (passed during the first years of democracy) were voided by the Argentine Supreme Court in June 2005 and repealed by Congress in 2006, and Menem's pardons were rescinded shortly afterwards. Menéndez was again brought before justice, this time accused of the kidnapping, torture and murder of four members of the Workers' Revolutionary Party. In the trial that ended on 24 July 2008, he was found guilty and sentenced to a life sentence, to be served in a regular prison.

In August 2008, Menéndez, along with fellow general Antonio Domingo Bussi, was found guilty of the forced disappearance and murder of politician Guillermo Vargas Aignasse and sentenced to a further life sentence.

According to the Human Rights NGO, "Project Disappeared," he personally supervised and directed torture and executions. He was responsible for the camp of "La Perla" (located in Córdoba), in which 2200 persons were killed. He was later indicted by Spanish Judge Baltazar Garzón, who issued an arrest warrant against him.

Menéndez was sentenced to life imprisonment by a Tucumán Province Court of Appeals on August 28, 2008, on the charge of crimes against humanity.“We had to take action in the war started by the Marxist terrorists,” Menéndez said before sentencing. “No country has ever tried its armed forces for what its government asked of it”, he added in his defence and in protest at the trials.

On 4 July 2014 Menéndez and Luis Estrella were found guilty of ordering the murder of Enrique Angelelli, bishop of La Rioja, Argentina, in August 1976. He received an additional life sentence.

== Death ==
Menéndez died on February 27, 2018, from a reported cardiogenic shock: he was 90 years old.

== See also ==
- Mario Benjamín Menéndez
