= Mario Agodino =

Argentine politician

Provisional Governor of Córdoba
- In office 28 February 1974 – 25 March 1974
- Preceded by: Ricardo Obregón Cano
- Succeeded by: Duilio Brunello

Personal details
- Born: c. 1917; San Francisco (Córdoba)
- Died: 1975 (aged 58)
- Political party: None

Mario Dante Agodino (c. 1917 – 1975) was Provisional Governor of Córdoba, Argentina from 28 February 1974 to 25 March 1974.

Political offices
Preceded by Ricardo Obregón Cano	Provisional Governor of Córdoba; 1974	Succeeded by Duilio Brunello
