= Duilio Brunello =

Argentine Peronist politician (1925–2021)

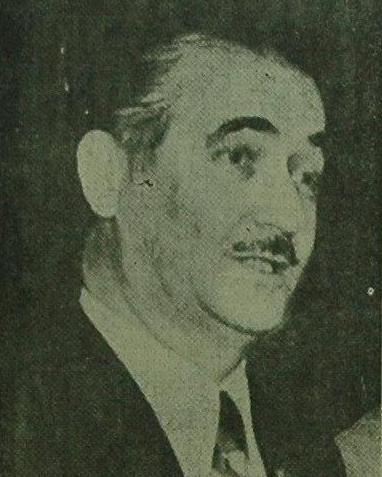

Federal Interventor of Córdoba
- In office 15 March 1974 – 7 September 1974
- Preceded by: Mario Agodino
- Succeeded by: Raúl Lacabanne

Personal details
- Born: 30 May 1925 San Fernando del Valle de Catamarca, Argentina
- Died: 9 May 2021 (aged 95)
- Party: None

Duilio Antonio Rafael Brunello (30 May 1925 – 9 May 2021) was an Argentine Peronist politician. He served in the Argentine Senate, the Argentine Chamber of Deputies and as Federal Interventor of Córdoba, Argentina from March 15, 1974 to September 7, 1974.

Brunello was elected to the Senate in 1955 for Catamarca Province, taking office in April 1955. The coup of September 1955 dissolved the Senate. He was later a vice-president of the Justicialist Party and was a national deputy at the time of the 1976 coup. He has also been deputy minister for Social Development.

In 1990, Brunello received a presidential pardon from Carlos Menem relating to charges of embezzling government funds.

Political offices
Preceded by Mario Agodino	Federal Interventor of Córdoba; 1974	Succeeded by Raúl Lacabanne
