= José Vaquero =

Argentine politician

de facto Federal Interventor of Córdoba
- In office 24 March 1976 – 12 April 1976
- Preceded by: Raúl Bercovich Rodriguez
- Succeeded by: Carlos Chasseing

Personal details
- Born: December 19, 1924 Córdoba, Argentina
- Died: September 22, 2006 (aged 81) Buenos Aires, Argentina
- Party: None
- Profession: Soldier

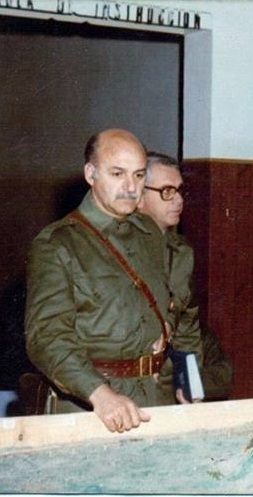
José Vaquero

José Antonio Vaquero (19 December 1924 – 22 September 2006) was de facto Federal Interventor of Córdoba, Argentina from 24 March 1976 to 12 April 1976.

== See also ==
- Operation Soberanía

Political offices
| Preceded by Raúl Bercovich Rodriguez | de facto Federal Interventor of Córdoba; 1976 - 1976 | Succeeded by Carlos Chasseing |
