= Eduardo Angeloz =

Argentine politician

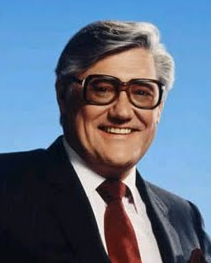
- Image for the campaign for the 1989 election

Governor of Córdoba
- In office December 10, 1983 – July 12, 1995
- Lieutenant: Edgardo Grosso (1983–1987); Mario Negri (1987–1991); Edgardo Grosso (1991–1995)
- Preceded by: Rubén Pellanda (de facto)
- Succeeded by: Ramón Mestre

Personal details
- Born: October 18, 1931 Río Tercero, Córdoba
- Died: August 23, 2017 (aged 85) Córdoba
- Party: Radical Civic Union
- Profession: Lawyer

Eduardo César Angeloz (October 18, 1931 – August 23, 2017) was an Argentine politician. He was a presidential candidate and Governor of Córdoba from 1983 to 1995.

Angeloz was born in Río Tercero, Córdoba, and received a law degree from the Universidad Nacional de Córdoba. He married Martha Marín, and the couple had two sons, Eduardo and Carlos, and a daughter, María Marta.

In 1953 Angeloz received his first Radical Civic Union Party mandate as President of the Youth Board in the city of Córdoba. In 1955 was appointed President of the Provincial Youth Board and President of the city Party in 1963. The same year Angeloz was also elected as Provincial Senator, and became the UCR whip in the house. From 1972 to 1982 he served as President of the Party Provincial Board.

In 1973 Angeloz was elected a national Senator. In 1976, after the coup d'état, he held a position in the Organization of American States In 1983 he was elected the 54th Governor of Córdoba for the 1983–1987 period and re-elected in 1987 for the period 1987–1991.

Angeloz was the UCR presidential candidate in the 1989 elections, but was defeated by Justicialist Party nominee Carlos Menem. He presented him as the neoliberal candidate in the election. In 1991 he was re-elected as Governor for the 1991–1995 period, and from 1995 to 2001, he again served as a Senator. Shortly before being sworn in he was charged with embezzlement, together with some relatives and close friends who had served in high public positions during his mandate. He was found not guilty in 1998. He died after complications from a hip-break fall combined with an undisclosed pre-existing condition on 23 August 2017.

== Bibliography ==
- El Tiempo de los argentinos. EMECÉ editores, diciembre de1987
- El Tiempo de la transición. EMECÉ editores, abril de 1988
- La propuesta de Angeloz: Ideas para el futuro argentino (Colección Controversia)

Political offices
Preceded by Rubén Pellanda	Governor of Córdoba; 1983–1995	Succeeded by Ramón Mestre
