= Raúl Lacabanne =

Argentine politician

Raúl Oscar Lacabanne

Federal Interventor of Córdoba
- In office 7 September 1974 – 19 September 1975
- Preceded by: Duilio Brunello
- Succeeded by: Luciano B. Menéndez

Personal details
- Born: 25 July 1914; Buenos Aires, Argentina
- Died: 7 March 1985 (aged 70); Buenos Aires, Argentina
- Political party: none
- Profession: soldier

Raúl Oscar Lacabanne (July 25, 1914 – March 7, 1985) was Federal Interventor of Córdoba, Argentina from September 7, 1974 to September 19, 1975.

Political offices
Preceded by Duilio Brunello	Federal Interventor of Córdoba; 1974 - 1975	Succeeded by Luciano B. Menéndez
