= Raúl Bercovich Rodriguez =

Argentine politician

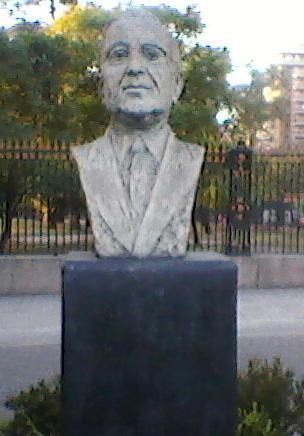

Federal Interventor of Córdoba
- In office 20 September 1975 – 24 March 1976
- Preceded by: Luciano B. Menendez
- Succeeded by: José Vaquero

Personal details
- Born: 1 January 1922; Córdoba, Argentina
- Died: 6 May 1993 (aged 71); Córdoba, Argentina
- Political party: None

Raúl Bercovich Rodriguez (1 January 1922 – 6 May 1993) was Federal Interventor of Córdoba, Argentina from September 20, 1975 to March 24, 1976. He was a member of the Peronist right-wing unionist tendency, rival to Ricardo Obregón Cano.

Political offices
Preceded by Luciano B. Menendez	Federal Interventor of Córdoba; 1975-1976	Succeeded by José Vaquero
