= Oscar Aguad =

Argentine politician

Oscar Raúl Aguad
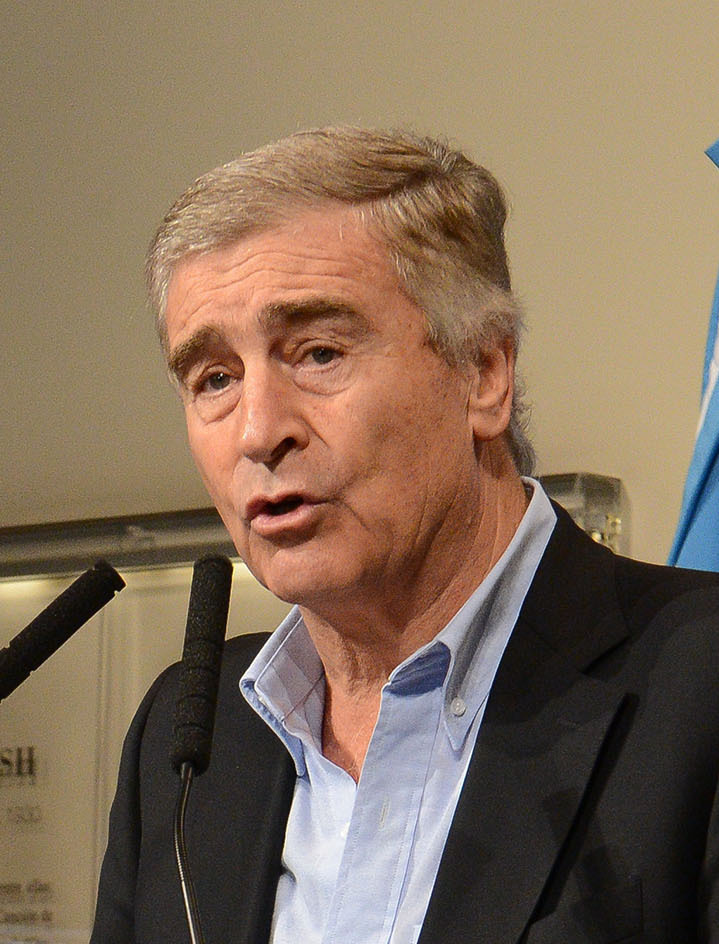
- Aguad in 2015

Minister of Defense of Argentina
- In office 17 July 2017 – 10 December 2019
- President: Mauricio Macri
- Preceded by: Julio Martínez
- Succeeded by: Agustín Rossi

Minister of Communication of Argentina
- In office 10 December 2015 – 17 July 2017
- President: Mauricio Macri

National Deputy
- In office 10 December 2005 – 10 December 2015
- Constituency: Córdoba

Federal Interventor in Corrientes
- In office 20 March 2001 – 10 December 2001
- Preceded by: Ramón Mestre
- Succeeded by: Ricardo Colombi (Governor)

Personal details
- Born: May 7, 1950 (age 76) Córdoba, Argentina
- Party: Radical Civic Union
- Other political affiliations: Juntos por el Cambio (since 2015)
- Spouse: María Dolores Albarenque
- Education: National University of Córdoba
- Profession: Lawyer

Oscar Raúl Aguad (born May 7, 1950) is an Argentine politician who served as the Minister of Defense from 2017 to 2019, serving in the cabinet of President Mauricio Macri. He was a member of the Chamber of Deputies from 2005 to 2015, where he became chief of the UCR bloc.

== Personal life ==
Aguad was born in Córdoba to Hilda Beily and Raúl Aguad, in 1950. His family is of Syrian origin. His father had, in the 1930s, established the first piano retailer in Córdoba and later opened an art gallery. He enrolled at the National University of Córdoba, and earned a law degree with a specialization in corporate, tax, and criminal law. He married María Dolores Albarenque in 1976, and they had five daughters.

== Career ==
He was brought on as an associate by José Severo Caballero, a Córdoba jurist who would be appointed president of the Argentine Supreme Court in 1983 by President Raúl Alfonsín. Following elections that year in which the UCR swept both national and Córdoba offices, Aguad was appointed Chief of Staff by Córdoba Mayor Ramón Mestre. Aguad served in the board of directors of La Voz del Interior (the leading Córdoba news daily), as well as of the University of Córdoba Foundation. He established Amparo Legal (Legal Recourse), a legal assistance office, in 1994, and later a law office.

Ramón Mestre would be both a friend and political mentor to Aguad. Mestre was appointed to head a Federal intervention of politically troubled Corrientes Province by President Fernando de la Rúa in 1999, and recommended Aguad for the post of mayor of Corrientes. The former was transferred to the post of Interior Minister by the President in March 2001, and Aguad was named as his successor. He presided over new provincial elections, and on December 10, was succeeded by a duly elected governor.

Aguad was elected to the Argentine Chamber of Deputies in 2005, and in 2007, his UCR colleagues elected him president of their caucus. He was a vocal opponent of Resolution 125, which would have raised export tariffs on a range of agricultural raw materials, and advocated greater revenue sharing benefits for the provinces. He was one of five Congressmen honored with a Parliamentary Prize in 2008 by Semanario Parlamentario (Parliamentary Weekly), and during the 2009–10 congress, was the body's most frequent speaker.

His tenure as Mayor of Corrientes led to controversy, however, when Aguad took a US$60 million loan to cancel Cecacor bonds previously issued by the province. The bonds, which had declined to junk status, could not ultimately be redeemed by the city government, and in 2009, Aguad was indicted for misfeasance related to their handling.

Aguad was elected First Vice President of the Chamber of Deputies (the body's second-highest ranking post) by his colleagues in December 2010. He obtained his party's nomination for Governor of Córdoba ahead of provincial elections on August 7. He was defeated, however, by former Governor José Manuel de la Sota.
