= Jorge Carcagno =

Argentine politician and general (1922–1983)

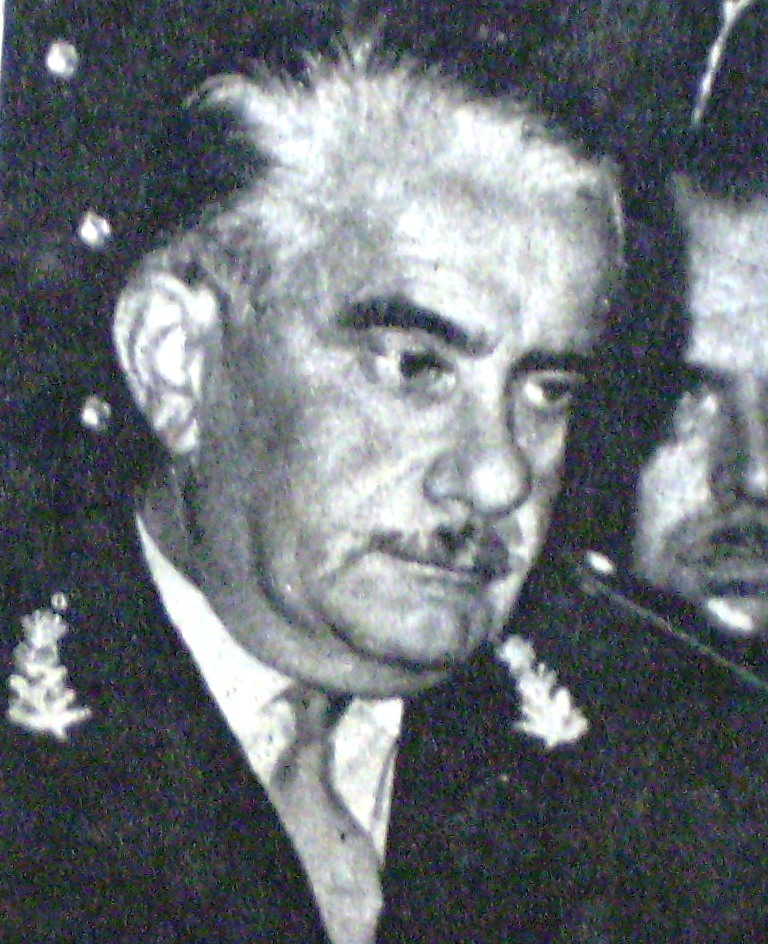

de facto Federal Interventor of Córdoba
- In office 16 June 1969 – 5 July 1969
- Preceded by: Carlos Caballero
- Succeeded by: Roberto Huerta

Personal details
- Born: October 28, 1922
- Died: January 22, 1983 (aged 60)
- Political party: None
- Profession: Soldier

Jorge Raúl Carcagno (28 October 1922 – 22 January 1983) was an Argentine general. He served as commander-in-chief of the Argentine Army and de facto Federal Interventor of Córdoba, Argentina from 16 June 1969 to 5 July 1969.

Carcagno was appointed to govern Córdoba by the military government of General Juan Carlos Onganía. He continued as a senior military figure and in the first democratic government of Héctor Cámpora, and in 1973, he served as commander-in-chief of the Army, being replaced later that year by President Juan Perón. In those months, Carcagno had initiated the 'Dorrego Operation', which sought to build bridges between the state and the politicised and militant youth movements.

Political offices
Preceded by Carlos Caballero	de facto Federal Interventor of Córdoba; 1969	Succeeded by Roberto Huerta
