= José C. Uriburu =

Argentine politician (1914–1996)

José Camilo Uriburu

de facto Federal Interventor of Córdoba
- In office 2 March 1971 – 22 March 1971
- Preceded by: Carlos Gigena Parker
- Succeeded by: Helvio Guozden

Personal details
- Born: June 12, 1914 Córdoba, Argentina
- Died: June 2, 1996 (aged 81) Buenos Aires, Argentina
- Profession: Lawyer

José Camilo Uriburu (12 June 1914 – 2 June 1996) was an Argentine politician who was de facto Federal Interventor of Córdoba from March 2, 1971 to March 22, 1971.

Political offices
Preceded by Carlos Gigena Parker	de facto Federal Interventor of Córdoba; 1971 - 1971	Succeeded by Helvio Guozden
