= Manuel Pizarro Cenjor =

Manuel Pizarro Cenjor (Murcia, November 2, 1889-Teruel, July 3, 1954) was a Spanish soldier who achieved the rank of divisional general (general de división) holding the position of deputy director of the Civil Guard and other positions of responsibility in Francoist Spain.

== Biography ==
He entered the Infantry Academy in 1904, and in 1910 he passed to the Civil Guard. In 1918 he became captain and was one of the envoys, at the request of the government of El Salvador, to the Central American nation for the reorganization of the National Guard. He remained there from 1923 to 1926, being assimilated to lieutenant colonel of the National Guard. In El Salvador, one of his sons was born, Manuel Pizarro Indart, father of Manuel Pizarro. After the Spanish Civil War he was appointed civil governor of Granada and Teruel, mainly responsible for the fight against the anti-Franco guerrilla. The latter was transferred on July 28, 1947, as civil governor and head of the Movement in that province, positions held until 1954, also occupying the position of head of the V Region of the Civil Guard.

Its mission was, as in previous places, to stifle the movements of the maquis in the province, particularly intense by the presence in the area of the guerrilla group Agrupación Guerrillera de Levante y Aragón (AGLA), task in which it was successful, declaring rural areas as a "war zone" and unleashing a harsh repression that affected not only the guerrillas, but the civilian population. A street in Teruel, General Pizarro Street, took its name in its memory since the 1950s. On the occasion of the approval of the Historical Memory Law, in 2009 its name was changed to Portal de Valencia Street, the name it had since medieval times. In the city of Granada there is still a street with its name.
