= Rodrigo Alonso (footballer, born 1982) =

Argentine footballer

Personal information
- Full name: Rodrigo Sebastián Alonso
- Date of birth: February 11, 1982 (age 44)
- Place of birth: Hurlingham, Buenos Aires, Argentina
- Height: 1.83 m (6 ft 0 in)
- Position: Defender

Senior career*
Years	Team	Apps	(Gls)
2003	Huracán	0	(0)
2004–2005	Flandria	30	(1)
2005–2006	Fénix	27	(1)
2006–2014	Acassuso	233	(21)
2012	→ Deportes Concepción (loan)	30	(3)
2014	Temperley	9	(0)
2015	Tristán Suárez	30	(1)
2016–2017	Atlanta	47	(0)
2017–2019	Almirante Brown	48	(2)
2019	Círculo Deportivo NO	9	(2)
2019–2022	Almirante Brown	19	(1)

Managerial career
- 2024: Almirante Brown
- * Club domestic league appearances and goals

Rodrigo Sebastián Alonso (born February 11, 1982) is an Argentine former football defender.

== Club career ==
Alonso started his professional football career in 2003 with Huracan, after which he would later move on to play for eight other clubs, while also going on loan to Deportes Concepción.

After a brief stint with Círculo Deportivo de Nicanor Otamendi, Alonso won the Primera B Metropolitana with Almirante Brown in 2020 and that was his only career trophy throughout his 22 years playing years according to his career stats on Soccer way.

Alonso retired at the end of 2022.

== Coaching career ==
Following his retirement, Alonso assumed as sport manager of Almirante Brown. In 2024, he became the head coach of the team.
