= Luis Funes =

Argentine politician

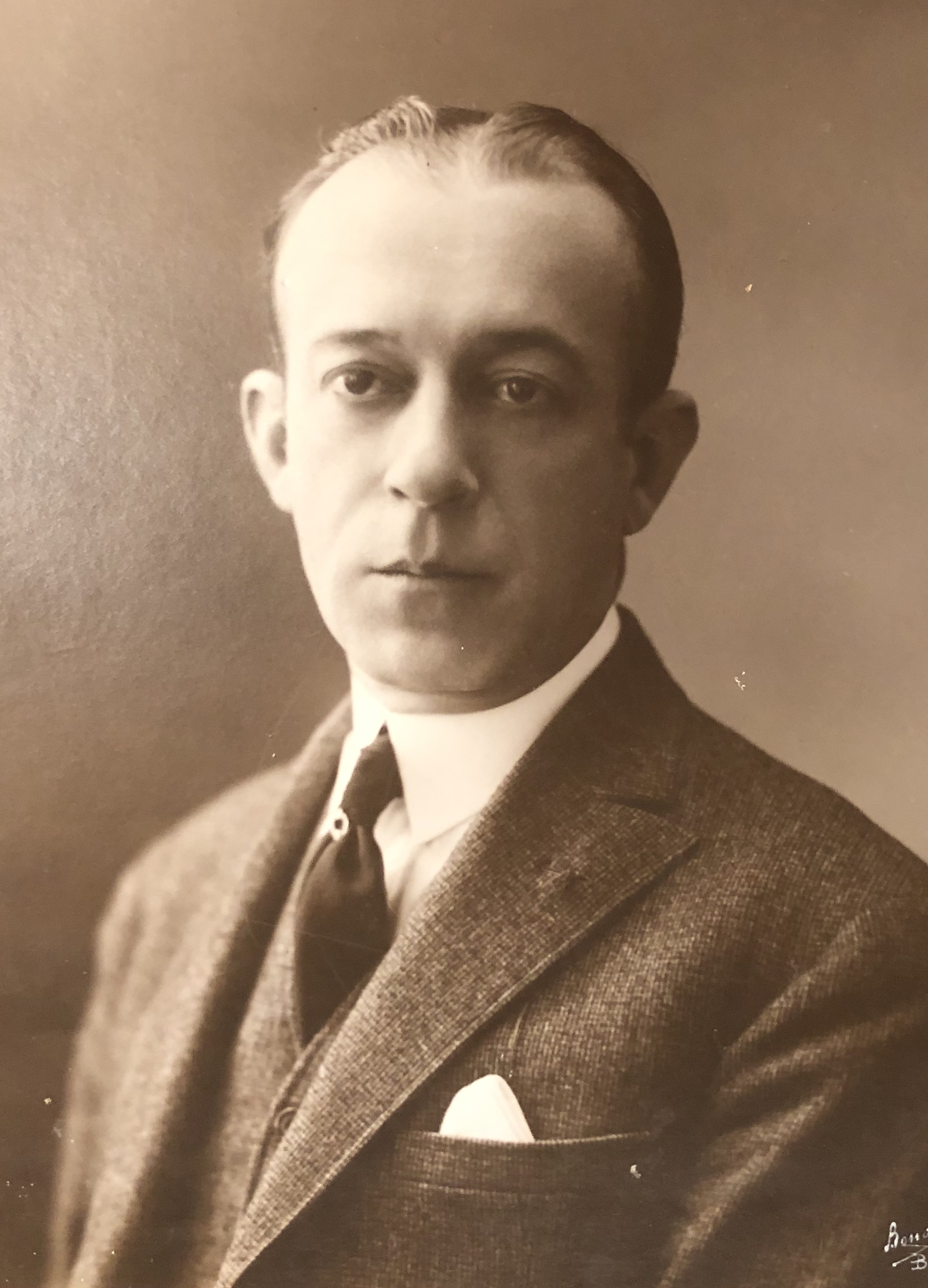
Luis Funes (1882–1970)

Luis Funes (1882–1970) was an Argentine politician and a member of the Democratic Party of Córdoba, who took over as interim governor of Córdoba in 1936.

Funes was born in the Argentine city of Bell-Ville, Cordoba in 1882. He was born in an aristocratic and traditional family of Cordoba.

He has worked at Banco Hipotecario and in the Province's Legislature. In 1936 he was elected as governor of Cordoba for some time. In 1936 he was succeeded by Amadeo Sabattini.

He married twice.
