= Rogelio Nores Martínez =

Argentine engineer and politician

Rogelio Nores Martínez (1906–1975) was an Argentine engineer and politician. He was born in the city of Córdoba in 1906 and died in 1975. His parents were Antonio Nores and Isabel Martinez Berrotarán.

== Education ==
He studied at the Faculty of Engineering at the National University of Córdoba, later becoming a teacher at that institution and at various high schools. In 1958 and 1959, he headed the now defunct newspaper Los Principios (The Principles) founded by his father. In addition, he served as engineer.

== Political career ==
He was appointed federal inspector in the province of Córdoba. He assumed that position on June 9, 1962, amid a tense atmosphere, as there were sectors of society who opposed his appointment, given his Catholic background.

He appointed Miguel Ángel Ferrer Deheza as a government minister. He resigned in September and was replaced by Edgar Ferreyra, who in turn was replaced by Dr. Gustavo Sarria in April 1963. He also appointed Peter Gordillo as public works, Dr. Luis Argüello Pitt as public health minister (a position occupied from April 1963 by Dr. Jorge Dionisi) and Mario Franzosi for finance. In March 1963, he established a secretariat, the Ministry of Education and Culture with Prof. Rosa Porfirio in charge. He appointed Vito Remo Roggio as commissioner in the municipality of Córdoba, in December 1962.

== Legacy ==
On October 12, 1963, Nores Martinez handed over power to the governor-elect, Justo Páez Molina. He served as rector of the National University of Córdoba between January 31, 1967 and March 20, 1970 and later chaired the board of the Los Principios newspaper.

Nores Martinez received ongoing criticism from teachers, due to decisions made in the newly created Secretariat - Ministry of Education. He also had to deal with the Motor Carrier Management Commission (CATA), which was responsible for the bus companies and trams, because of its monthly debt which had to be covered by the government. After the disappearance of the CATA, on October 8, 1962 the trams stopped circulating in the city of Córdoba.
