= 1969 in Argentina =

- Decades: 1940s; 1950s; 1960s; 1970s; 1980s
- See also: Other events of 1969; List of years in Argentina

Events from the year 1969 in Argentina.

== Incumbents ==
- President: Juan Carlos Onganía

=== Governors ===
- Buenos Aires Province: Francisco A. Imaz (until 16 June); Saturnino Llorente (from 16 June)
- Chubut Province: Guillermo Pérez Pitton
- Mendoza Province: José Eugenio Blanco

=== Vice Governors ===
- Buenos Aires Province: vacant

== Events ==
- May – Cordobazo uprising
- May–September – Rosariazo uprising

== Births ==
=== February ===
- February 1 – Gabriel Batistuta, footballer

=== September ===
- September 12 – Ángel Cabrera, golfer

== See also ==
- List of Argentine films of 1969
