= 1965 in Argentine football =

Football in Argentina
- Season: 1965

1965 saw Boca Juniors win the league title and Independiente retain their Copa Libertadores title.

== Primera División ==
The Primera was expanded from 16 to 18 teams in 1965.

=== League table ===
Position	Team	Points	Played	Won	Drawn	Lost	For	Against	Difference
1	Boca Juniors	50	34	19	12	3	55	30	25
2	River Plate	49	34	22	5	7	55	24	31
3	Vélez Sársfield	40	34	14	12	8	48	32	16
4	Ferro Carril Oeste	37	34	11	15	8	41	33	8
5	Racing Club	36	34	10	16	8	39	35	4
6	Estudiantes de La Plata	36	34	13	10	11	41	39	2
7	Platense	35	34	12	11	11	37	30	7
8	San Lorenzo	34	34	12	10	12	41	35	6
9	Banfield	34	34	11	12	11	34	32	2
10	Rosario Central	32	34	9	14	11	37	39	-2
11	Newell's Old Boys	32	34	9	14	11	29	40	-11
12	Independiente	31	34	8	15	11	30	31	-1
13	Huracán	31	34	11	9	14	45	54	-9
14	Atlanta	29	34	9	11	14	33	42	-9
15	Lanús	29	34	9	11	14	31	43	-12
16	Argentinos Juniors	28	34	10	8	16	41	51	-10
17	Gimnasia de La Plata	25	34	9	7	18	31	57	-26
18	Chacarita Juniors	24	34	5	14	15	32	53	-19

=== Relegation ===
There was no relegation due to the expansion of the Primera División from 18 to 20 teams.

=== Copa Libertadores ===
- Boca Juniors and River Plate qualified for Copa Libertadores 1966 via the league, Independiente qualified as the Libertadores champions of 1965.

== Copa Libertadores 1965 ==
- Independiente: Champions
- Boca Juniors: Semi-finalist
