= Ricardo Obregón Cano =

Argentine politician

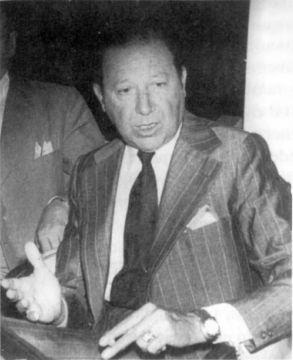

53rd Governor of Córdoba
- In office 25 May 1973 – 28 February 1974
- Vice Governor: Hipólito Atilio López
- Preceded by: Helvio Guozden
- Succeeded by: Mario Agodino

Personal details
- Born: April 4, 1917 Río Cuarto, Córdoba, Argentina
- Died: June 19, 2016 (aged 99)
- Party: Peronist
- Profession: Dentist

Ricardo Obregón Cano (April 4, 1917 – June 19, 2016) was an Argentine Justicialist Party politician. Born in Río Cuarto, Córdoba, he was Governor of Córdoba from May 25, 1973, to February 28, 1974. A left-wing Peronist, he was deposed by a police coup in 1974, which was later backed by Juan Perón.

== Governor of Córdoba ==
Obregón Cano was a left-wing Peronist, close to Héctor José Cámpora, Juan Perón's delegate and President from May 1973 to June 1973. He was elected as candidate of the Peronist Frente Justicialista de Liberación Nacional (FREJULI) during the March 1973 general election, with a 53.3% share of the vote, along with his vice-governor Atilio Lopez, close to the 62 Organizaciones Peronistas reform movement in the trade unions. His victory, however, had been the left-wing Peronists' victory against the orthodox Peronists. Indeed, representatives of the latter, Julio Antún (Mesa Redonda Permanente Peronista) and Raúl Bercovich Rodriguez (Unidad y Lealtad), had led a rival electoral list against Obregón Cano in 1973, but had been defeated in the primary elections by 60% of the votes.

Although the FREJULI had obtained support from the Peronist Youth and the Montoneros during the electoral campaign, as well as from members of the Intransigent Radical Civic Union and from the Popular Unitary Action Movement, Obregón Cano had initiated a shift to the center, allying himself with the Radical Civic Union (UCR) (signing a compromise pact, or Acta de Compromiso) and several Christian Democrats. Obregón Cano nominated many figures from outside the Peronist movement and the Justicialist Party in the regional administration, taking in, for instance, members from the UCR, the Christian-democracy or the Democratic Party.

As a forthcoming sign of this alliance, José Antonio Allende, an important member of the Christian Democratic Party, had been elected in 1973 as a national senator for the FREJULI. This shift to the center led Obregón Cano's administration to be opposed simultaneously by the revolutionary Peronist left and by the political, and trade-unionist, Peronist right. In Córdoba, the latter was represented by Julio Antún, Raúl Bercovich Rodriguez, Alejo Simó (from the Unión Obrera Metalúrgica), Mauricio Labat and others.

During his administration, daily demonstrations organized by the Peronist youth affected Córdoba in support of social and revolutionary process; the return of Peron had been the signal of end of years of dictatorship and offered the possibility of initiating a new phase. On the other hand, José Ignacio Rucci, leader of the CGT union and of the Peronist Right, claimed to wrestle back control of the local CGT section from other rival groups, such as Atilio Lopez's UTA legalist tendency, leader of Luz y Fuerza Agustín Tosco who claimed a democratic and pluralist unionism, or the "classists", headed by René Salamanca's SMATA union and advocates of a traditional class-struggle viewpoint. After Héctor Cámpora's resignation from the Presidency in June 1973, the offensive headed by Rucci's orthodox tendency grew stronger. Several bombings affected SMATA and Luz y Fuerza, in a foreword of the "Dirty War". These unions conflicts were "fixed" by a normalizatory Congress, organized by Labour Minister Ricardo Otero and called for on February 28, 1974, the same day as the police coup against Obregón Cano.

== Police coup ==
Quickly losing Perón's support, as right-wing Peronism was regaining power, Obregón Cano was thus toppled in a coup known as the navarrazo, led by the province's police chief, Antonio Navarro, and after which the vice-governor Atilio Lopez was soon killed, allegedly by the Alianza Anticomunista Argentina. Peron validated the coup which was also supported by Julio Antún. On the other hand, although the Montoneros of Cordoba requested Obregón Cano's return to his functions, it also harshly criticized the governor for its "weakness" in not supporting itself on "popular mobilization" and believing in "bureaucratic arrangements". According to historian Servetto, "the Peronist right... thus stimulated the intervention of security forces to resolve internal conflicts of Peronism". Obregón Cano was replaced by Mario Agodino. Obregón Cano then joined the Authentic Peronist Party, a left-wing splinter group from the Justicialist Party.

== Later life and death ==
In 1985, after the return of civilian rule, Cano was charged of "illicit association" with the Montoneros and sentenced to ten years of prison due to the theory of the two demons, and was jailed, ironically, in Devoto Prison, the same place where the generals judged during the Trial of the Juntas were kept. Obregón Cano was finally released in 1989. He died on June 19, 2016, aged 99.

== See also ==
- Center Region (Argentina) (agreement signed with other governors)

Political offices
Preceded by Helvio Guozden	Governor of Córdoba; 1973–1974	Succeeded by Mario Agodino
