= Alberto Guglielmone =

Argentine general

Alberto Guglielmone (1888–1968) was an Argentine general. He was a member of the junta's Joint Chiefs of Staff, or "generals' and admirals' committee".

Guglielmone, whose father was born in Italy, was born in Buenos Aires in 1888, and graduated from the military academy in 1909. He rose through the ranks of the Argentine military to command the 4th Military Region. Sources differ on whether Guglielmone was neutral and pro- or anti-Peronist in the 1946 Argentina Presidential Election.
