= Enrique Tornú =

Argentine physician (1865–1901)

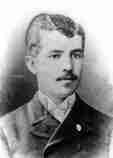
Enrique Tornú

Enrique Tornú (September 1, 1865 – August 23, 1901) was an Argentine physician and hygienist.

Born in Buenos Aires on September 1, 1865, he studied at the Colegio Nacional de Buenos Aires high school. Later on, he began studying medicine at the University of Buenos Aires, but graduated in Paris, where he moved as part of his country diplomatic mission. His doctoral thesis was on surgeries performed through the sacrum.

Tornú was a pioneer of tuberculosis treatment in Argentina, being later infected with tuberculosis himself. He suggested therapy guidelines and recommended the opening of dedicated sanatoria and traveled extensively through Córdoba highlands to identify adequate locations. On May 11, 1901 he co-founded the Liga Argentina contra la Tuberculosis (Argentine League against Tuberculosis).

Enrique Tornú committed suicide in 1901, after contracting tuberculosis.

On 1904, the first hospital in Buenos Aires for tuberculosis treatment was inaugurated, bearing Tornú's name.

== Works ==
- Climatología médica de las sierras de Córdoba
- La cura de altitud
- Apuntes sobre tuberculosis y sanatorios
