= 1900 in Argentine football =

Football in Argentina
- Season: 1900

Men's football
- Primera División: English High School
- Segunda División: Banfield

1900 in Argentine football saw English High School members joining again to the team to request their affiliation. Quilmes Rovers also returned under its new name "Quilmes Atlético Club". Both teams replaced Lobos and Lanús Athletic.

English High School won its first Argentine championship. The international Tie Cup (where teams from Buenos Aires, Rosario and Montevideo took part) was played for the first time, being won by Belgrano AC.

== Primera División ==
The championship continued with the 4 team league format, with each team playing the other twice.

=== Final standings ===
Pos	Team	Pts	G	W	D	L	Gf	Ga	Gd
1	English High School	11	6	5	1	0	18	3	+15
2	Lomas AC	5	6	2	1	3	9	9	+0
3	Belgrano AC	4	6	2	0	4	8	13	-5
4	Quilmes	4	6	2	0	4	9	19	-10

== Lower divisions ==
=== Primera B ===
- Champion: Banfield

=== Primera C ===
- Champion: English High School (youth division)

== International ==
=== Tie Cup ===
==== Final ====
26 August 1900

(Argentina) Belgrano AC	2-0	(Argentina) Rosario Athletic

Flores
