= Ignacio Noé =

Argentinian artist (born 1965)

- Born: January 27, 1965 (age 61) Escobar, Buenos Aires Province, Argentina
- Areas: Penciller, Inker
- Pseudonym: Noe

Ignacio Noé (born January 27, 1965, Escobar, Buenos Aires Province), usually known simply as Noé, is an Argentine artist in a wide range of graphic genres, working in comics, children's books, magazine illustration and erotic comics, in a highly rendered style that utilizes both digital and traditional media. His works include "The Piano Tuner", "Ship of Fools" and most notably "The Convent of Hell".

Noé also gives painting workshops geared towards the field of illustration.

== Bibliography (English editions of adult stories) ==
- The Convent of Hell (El Convento Infernal, Kiss Comix, 1996, with writer Ricardo Barreiro), New York City: NBM Publishing (1998). ISBN 978-1-56163-192-6.
- Doctor, I´m Too Big (Diet, Kiss Comix, 1997). New York: NBM Publishing (1998). ISBN 978-1-56163-208-4.
- Ship Of Fools (La Nave De Los Locos, Kiss Comix, 1998). New York: NBM Publishing (1999). ISBN 978-1-56163-230-5.
- The Piano Tuner (El Afinador, Kiss Comix, 2001). New York: NBM Publishing (2003). ISBN 978-1-56163-344-9.
- The Piano Tuner, Vol. 2 (El Afinador, Kiss Comix, 2003). New York: NBM Publishing (2009). ISBN 978-1-56163-551-1.
- Pin-Up Artist (Exposición, Kiss Comix, 2005). New York: NBM Publishing (2011). ISBN 978-1-56163-587-0.
- Aldana (Aldana, Kiss Comix, 2006). New York: NBM Publishing (2009). ISBN 978-1-56163-575-7.
