= Expulsion of Montoneros from Plaza de Mayo =

1974 political event in Argentina

- Date: May 1, 1974
- Location: Plaza de Mayo, Buenos Aires
- Participants: Juan Perón; Montoneros
- Outcome: Montoneros are expelled from Peronism, and become a clandestine organization

The expulsion of Montoneros from Plaza de Mayo was a key event of the third presidency of Juan Perón. It took place on May 1, 1974, during celebrations of International Workers' Day.

== Context ==
The Montoneros was a guerilla organization created in the early 1970s during the Argentine Revolution military dictatorship. President Juan Perón had been deposed in 1955 and Peronism was proscribed since then; Perón was living in Spain at the time. Local politics were influenced by the Cold War: left-wing groups attempted to seize power, deposing the right-wing dictatorship. As a result, Peronism and militant organizations worked together to stifle them.

Differences arose when they finally succeeded, and de facto president Alejandro Lanusse was called to elections, lifting the proscription over Peronism. Héctor José Cámpora was elected president, but resigned shortly after, and Perón was elected president afterwards. Montoneros curtailed their militant attacks after the calling for elections, but the non-Peronist groups like the People's Revolutionary Army did not, and were outlawed. Montoneros were initially accepted within Peronism, but to a very low degree. For instance, Perón refused to recognize the informal military ranks used within their organizations for top Montonero personnel. Perón favored labour unions and common Peronist politicians instead.

Montoneros still thought that Perón was sympathetic to them, and that his reservations were caused by the people close to him, who were misinforming him. Thus, they believed that they had to get rid of intermediaries to have direct contact with Perón. This led to the murder of the union leader José Ignacio Rucci, who was close to Perón. But the consequence was the opposite of what was expected, and Perón condemned them for it.

== The event ==
The government organized a demonstration at the Plaza de Mayo on May 1, 1974, during celebrations of International Workers' Day. There were members of both the Montoneros and the CGT union. Isabel Perón, wife of Juan Perón, was repeatedly insulted by the Montoneros, who preferred his second wife, the late Eva Perón. Perón forbade the use of partisan flags, but Montoneros ignored the prohibition: they hid their flags within their drums, and headed to the plaza carrying national flags. Thus, the police allowed them to pass, and they later unveiled and used Montonero flags.

When Perón showed up at the balcony of the Casa Rosada, he was enraged with the Montoneros, both for the murder of Rucci some months ago, and by the insults to his wife and the use of flags despite his instructions. Montoneros and syndicalists confronted each other with demonstrative songs. Perón started by praising the role of the syndicalists, which motivated stronger songs of rejection from Montoneros. Perón insisted in supporting the syndicalists for their twenty-year-long fight during the Peronist proscription, and contrasted them with "those stupids that scream". Further songs from the Montoneros did not allow him to continue talking. Even more enraged by the interruption, he added that "...and now it happens that some callows, pretend to have more merits than those who fought during twenty years. For that reason, partners, I want to honor those organizations and those wise and prudent leaders who had kept their forces, and who saw their leaders murdered, still without the thundering punishment". With this comment, Perón blamed Montoneros directly for the murder of Rucci. Montoneros, however, manifested that they were proud of Rucci's assassination, singing "Rucci, traitor, greetings to Vandor" (a song referencing Augusto Vandor, another unionist leader killed by militant organizations).

At that point, Montoneros began to leave the plaza, with Perón still talking. Some newspapers of the time estimate that half of the people present left the plaza, others, that it was a third. This unprecedented situation forced Perón to make a shorter speech, and end the demonstration earlier.

== Consequences ==
After the demonstration, formal relations between Montoneros and Peronism were definitely ended. Montoneros became a clandestine organization once more, and outlawed by the government a year later. José López Rega, secretary of Perón and a close confidant of Isabel, organized the Argentine Anticommunist Alliance to fight against the militant groups. Perón died of old age and Isabel Perón, who became president, signed decree 261 designating Montoneros a subversive organization, and ordering their annihilation. The National Reorganization Process deposed Isabel and continued the Dirty War against Montoneros, who were ultimately defeated.

== Bibliography ==
- Galasso, Norberto (2006). Perón: Exilio, resistencia, retorno y muerte (1955-1974). Buenos Aires: Colihue. ISBN 950-581-400-3.
- Luna, Félix (2004). Grandes protagonistas de la historia argentina: Juan Domingo Perón. Buenos Aires: La Nación. ISBN 950-49-1255-9.
