= 1902 in Argentine football =

Football in Argentina
- Season: 1902

Men's football
- Primera División: Alumni
- Segunda División: Barracas A.C. II
- Tercera División: Lomas Juniors

1902 in Argentine football saw Alumni win its 3rd consecutive league championship. Barracas Athletic (promoted in 1901) added to the tournament.

In international football, the Argentina national team played its first official game ever, a 6-0 win against Uruguay in Montevideo.

== Primera División ==
The first division championship was expanded to a 5-team league format, with each team playing the other twice.

=== Final standings ===
Pos	Team	Pts	G	W	D	L	Gf	Ga	Gd
1	Alumni	15	8	7	1	0	24	3	+21
2	Barracas Athletic	10	8	5	0	3	12	13	-1
3	Quilmes	7	8	3	1	4	6	6	+0
4	Belgrano AC	5	8	1	3	4	17	20	-13
5	Lomas AC	3	8	1	1	6	3	10	-7

== Lower divisions ==
=== Primera B ===
- Champion: Barracas A.C. II

=== Primera C ===
- Champion: Lomas Juniors

== International cup ==
=== Tie Cup ===
- Champion: (Argentina) Rosario AC

==== Playoffs ====
24 August 1902

Rosario AC (Argentina)	1-1	(Argentina) Alumni

Sociedad Hípica Argentina

14 September 1902

Rosario AC (Argentina)	1-1	(Argentina) Alumni

Sociedad Hípica Argentina

28 September 1902

Rosario AC (Argentina)	2-1	(Argentina) Alumni
	Report

Sociedad Hípica Argentina

== Argentina national team ==
The Argentina national team played its second match ever, a 6–0 win against Uruguay in front of 8,000 spectators in the Paso del Molino stadium in Montevideo.

Lineup: José Buruca Laforia (Barracas AC), William Leslie (Quilmes), Walter Buchanan (Alumni), Eduardo Duggan (Belgrano AC), Carlos Buchanan (Alumni), Ernesto Brown (Alumni), Edward Morgan (Quilmes), Juan Moore (captain) (Alumni), Juan Anderson (Lomas AC), Carlos Dickinson (Belgrano AC), Jorge Brown (Alumni)

=== Results ===
Date	Venue/City	Rival	Score	Scorers	Report
16 July 1902	Montevideo	Uruguay	6-0	Dickinson, Arimalo o.g., Morgan, Carve o.g., Anderson, J. Brown	
1902	Montevideo	(Uruguay) Albion FC	0-1		
