= Hugo Pablo Centurión =

Argentine footballer

Personal information
- Date of birth: 2 September 1977 (age 49)
- Place of birth: Eldorado, Misiones, Argentina
- Height: 1.73 m (5 ft 8 in)
- Positions: Forward; midfielder

Senior career*
Years	Team	Apps	(Gls)
2000–2001	Sol de América		
2002	12 de Octubre		
2002	Recoleta		
2003	Sportivo Luqueño		
2004–2005	Libertad		
2005	Deportes Concepción		
2006	Deportivo Pasto		
2007	América		
2008	3 de Febrero		
2008	Macará		
2009	Deportivo Pasto		
2010	Deportes Tolima		
2011	Deportivo Pasto		

International career
- Argentina
- * Club domestic league appearances and goals

Hugo Pablo Centurión (born 2 September 1976 in Eldorado, Misiones, Argentina) is an Argentine former professional footballer naturalized Colombian who played as a forward or midfielder.
