= 1982 in Argentina =

- Decades: 1960s; 1970s; 1980s; 1990s; 2000s
- See also: Other events of 1982; List of years in Argentina

Events in the year 1982 in Argentina.

== Incumbents ==
- President:
  - Leopoldo Galtieri (until 18 June)
  - Alfredo Oscar Saint Jean (18 June–1 July)
  - Reynaldo Bignone (from 1 July)

== Events ==
=== April ===
- 2 April: The Falklands War began with the 1982 invasion of the Falkland Islands.
- 3 April: Invasion of South Georgia
- 25 April: Operation Paraquet

=== May ===
- 14–15 May: Raid on Pebble Island
- 21–23 May: Operation Sutton
- 21–25 May: Battle of San Carlos
- 23 May: Battle of Seal Cove
- 28–29 May: Battle of Goose Green
- 29 May–11 June: Battle of Mount Kent
- 31 May: Skirmish at Top Malo House

=== June ===
- 8 June: Bluff Cove air attacks
- 10 June: Skirmish at Many Branch Point
- 11–12 June:
  - Battle of Mount Harriet
  - Battle of Mount Longdon
- 13–14 June
  - Battle of Wireless Ridge
  - Battle of Mount Tumbledown
- 14 June: Mario Menéndez surrendered to Major General Jeremy Moore, ending the Falklands War.

== Births ==
- 4 January: Paulo Ferrari, footballer
- 11 February: Rodrigo Alonso, footballer
- 16 February: Gabriel Graciani, footballer
- 12 March: Gonzalo Heredia, actor
- 20 April: Juan Quiroga, footballer
- 4 May: Facundo Tello, FIFA football referee
- 14 May: Esmeralda Mitre, actress
