= Lucas González, Argentina =

Coordinates: 32°24′S 59°33′W

Lucas González
- Municipality and village
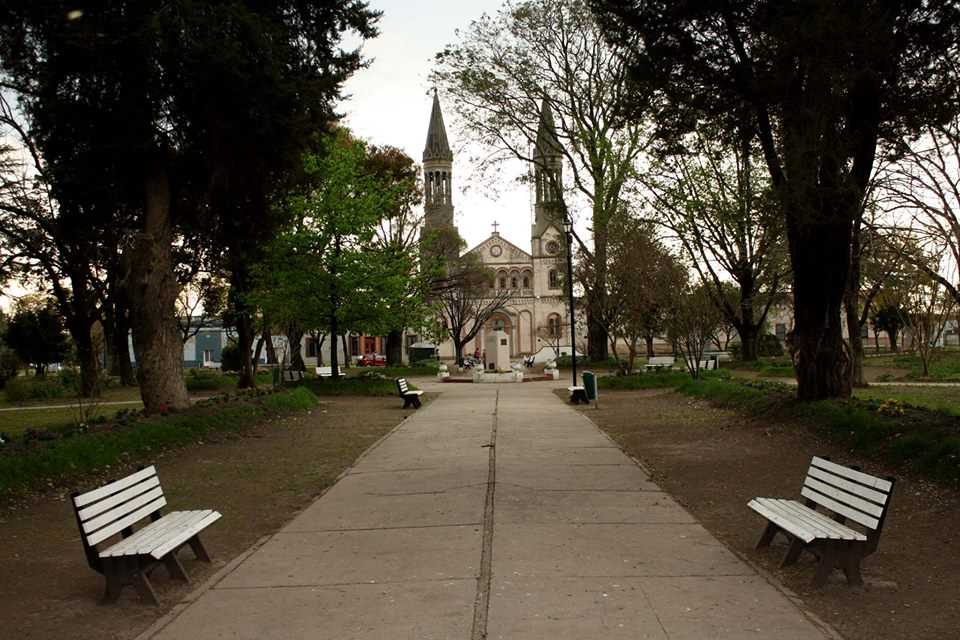
- Parroquia San Lucas Evangelista, view from the San Martin Square
- Interactive map of Lucas González
- Country: Argentina
- Province: Entre Ríos Province
- Time zone: UTC−3 (ART)

Lucas González is a village and municipality in Entre Ríos Province in north-eastern Argentina.
