= José Manuel Álvarez =

Argentine politician

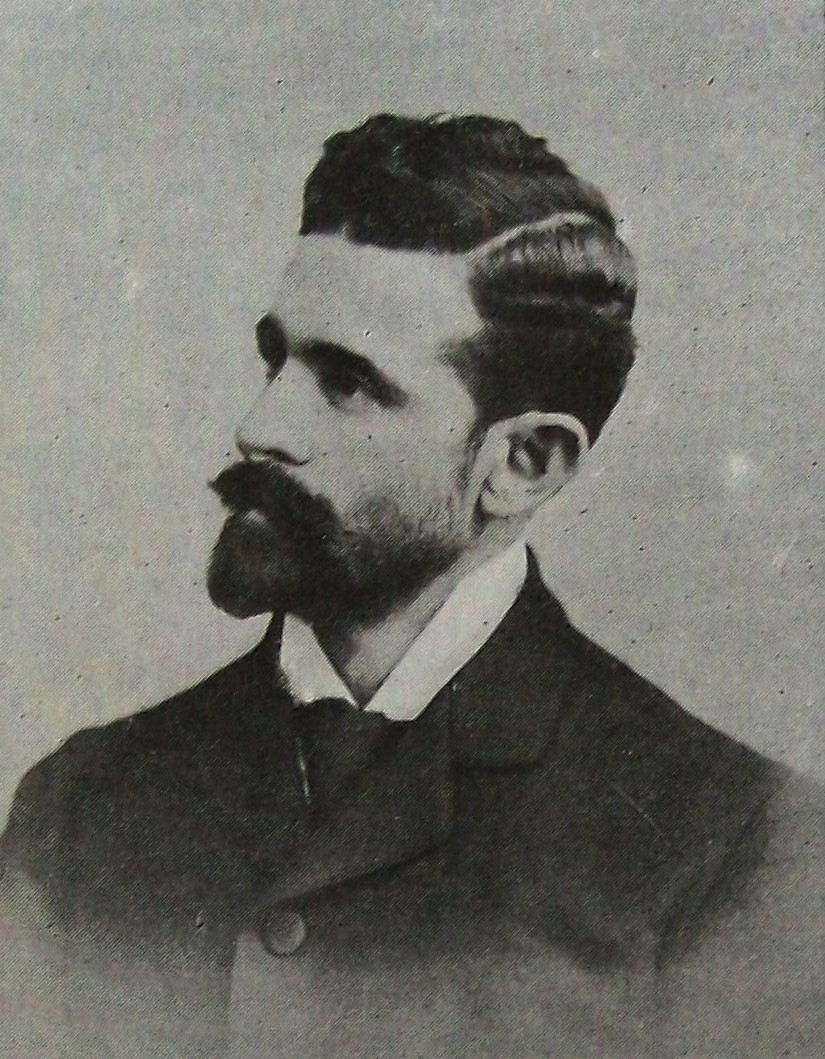
- José Manuel Álvarez

30th Governor of Córdoba
- In office 17 May 1901 – 17 May 1904
- Governor of Córdoba|Lieutenant: Nicolás Berrotarán
- Preceded by: Donaciano del Campillo
- Succeeded by: José Vicente de Olmos

Personal details
- Born: José Manuel Álvarez Centeno; 7 August 1859; Córdoba, Argentina
- Died: 1916
- Political party: National Autonomist Party
- Profession: Physician

José Manuel Álvarez (7 August 1859 – 1916) an Argentine physician and politician who was Governor of Córdoba from 17 May 1901 to 17 May 1904.

Political offices
Preceded by Donaciano del Campillo	Governor of Córdoba; 1901–1904	Succeeded by José Vicente de Olmos
