= Manuel D. Pizarro =

Argentine politician, judge and lawyer (1841–1909)

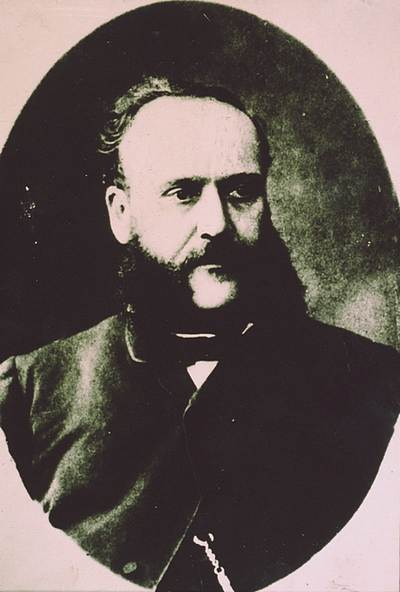
Manuel Demetrio Pizarro

Manuel Demetrio Pizarro (Córdoba, April 9, 1841 – Córdoba, October 16, 1909), also known as "the youngest of the plinio", according to Domingo Sarmiento was a lawyer, writer, journalist, teacher and Argentine politician, and member of the National Autonomist Party. He served as minister of Servando Bayo in Santa Fe, was provincial deputy, and professor of Civil Law in the Faculty of Jurisprudence, National Senator, Minister of the Nation during the period of Roca and, later, governor of Cordoba Province. It is attributed to the famous phrase pronounced as a result of the consequences that caused the Revolution of the Park in Argentina: "The revolution is defeated, but the government is dead."
