= 1986 in Argentina =

- Decades: 1960s; 1970s; 1980s; 1990s; 2000s
- See also: Other events of 1986; List of years in Argentina

The following are events from the year 1986 in Argentina.

== Incumbents ==
- President: Raúl Alfonsín
- Vice President: Víctor Hipólito Martínez

=== Governors ===
- Governor of Buenos Aires Province: Alejandro Armendáriz
- Governor of Corrientes Province: José Antonio Romero Feris
- Governor of Jujuy Province: Carlos Snopek
- Governor of Misiones Province: Ricardo Barrios Arrechea
- Governor of Santa Fe Province: José María Vernet

== Events ==
=== May ===
- 28 May: The Mantilla-class patrol vessel PNA Prefecto Derbes of the Prefectura Naval Argentina, set fire and sink the Taiwanese-flagged trawler Chian-der 3 at a location 24 nautical miles (44 km; 28 mi) outside the United Kingdom's Total Exclusion Zone, which covers a circle of 200 nautical miles (370 km; 230 mi) from the centre of the Falklands Islands. Two Taiwanese fishermen are killed, while four others are injured.

=== June ===
- 22 June: In one of the most famous FIFA World Cup matches, Argentinian football player Diego Maradona scores a handball goal (nicknamed the "Hand of God") and then dribbles past the entire English football team to score a second goal (nicknamed "The Goal of the Century") with Argentina winning 2–1 against England.
- 29 June: Argentina defeats West Germany 3-2 in the 1986 FIFA World Cup final. This is Argentina's second World Cup title.

=== July ===
- 29 July: Argentine President Raúl Alfonsín and Brazilian President José Sarney sign economic agreements in Buenos Aires for mutual integration; the basis for the future creation of the Southern Common Market (Mercosur).

=== December ===
- 24 December: The Argentine National Congress passes the Full stop law (Ley de Punto Final), which effectively halts further investigations and prosecutions of individuals involved in crimes committed during the dictatorship, limiting legal actions to those indicted within 60 days of the law's enactment.

== Births ==
=== January ===
- 12 January - Dani Osvaldo, footballer

=== April ===
- 10 April - Fernando Gago, footballer
- 28 April - Jazmín Beccar Varela, actress

=== May ===
- 1 May - Diego Valeri, footballer

=== October ===
- 16 October - Franco Armani, footballer

=== November ===
- 24 November - Micaela Vázquez actress

== Deaths ==
=== January ===
- 18 January - Edmundo Rivero, musician (b. 1911)

=== June ===
- 6 June - Robert Stuart, cricketeer (b. 1908)
- 9 June - Matilde Díaz Vélez, philanthropist and urbanist (b. 1899)
- 14 June - Jorge Luis Borges, short story writer (b. 1899)

=== July ===
- 11 July - Enrique Villegas, pianist (b. 1913)

=== December ===
- 5 December - Roberto Escalada, actor (b. 1914)

== See also ==
- List of Argentine films of 1986
