= Antonio Zinny =

Argentine lawyer, journalist and historian

Antonio Abraham Zinny
- Born: October 1821; Gibraltar
- Died: September 1890 (aged 68); Buenos Aires
- Occupations: Lawyer, journalist, historian
- Known for: History of the Argentine provinces

Antonio Abraham Zinny (October 1821 – September 1890) was an Argentine lawyer, journalist and historian originally from Gibraltar. He was especially prominent as a popular historian of Argentina in the first half of the twentieth century and of the Governors of Argentine Provinces, the first serious attempt to chronicle the history of the provinces of Argentina.

== Biography ==
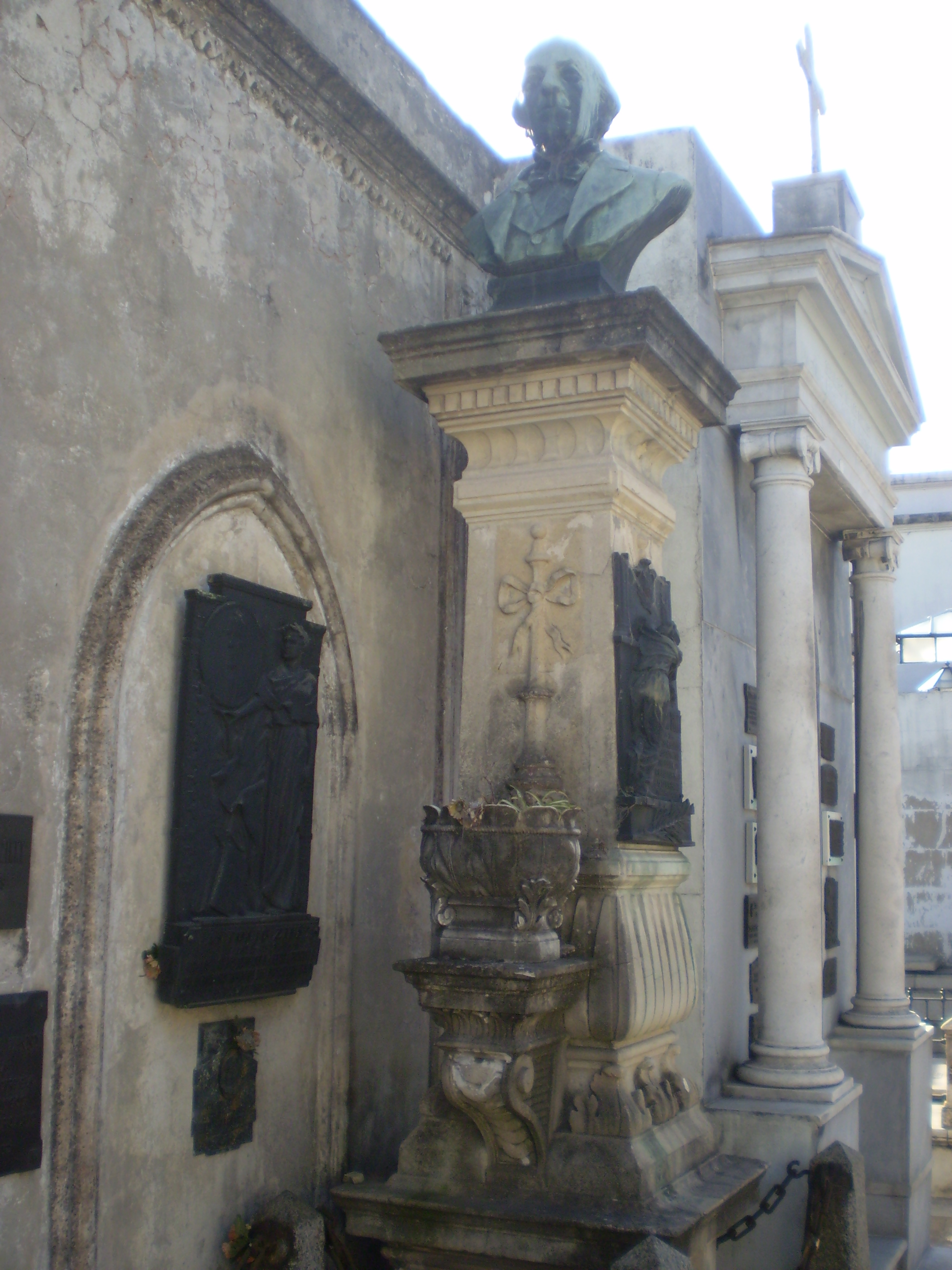
Tomb of the author in the cemetery of La Recoleta

Antonio Abraham Zinny was born in Gibraltar in October 1821. He studied law in Spain and in 1842 moved to Buenos Aires, where he completed his studies and received his doctorate in jurisprudence at the University of Buenos Aires. For a while he taught at the university. He moved to the city of Corrientes, where he founded the Argentine College. He also worked as a correspondent for the daily papers La Tribuna, La Nacion and El Nacional. Curiously, these dailies had opposite political positions.

On returning the Buenos Aires, Zinny organized the External Relations archives, and then the archives of the City of Buenos Aires. That work got him involved in history. During Governor Adolfo Alsina's term of office, he was inspector general of schools in Buenos Aires province, fulfilling the duties of a minister of education. He co-founded the Colegio de Mayo in Buenos Aires with Luis José de la Peña, Dardo Rocha and Eduardo Wilde.

Antonio Abraham Zinny died in Buenos Aires in September 1890 .

== Historical works ==
Antonio Abraham Zinny was noted for writing several history books, of which the best known is "History of the Governors of the Argentine Provinces". In this he was the first to cover the history of all the provinces, from the conquest until about 1880, singly and in one work. For almost all the provinces, Zinny's work provided the first history of the province. His view was liberal, and fanatically Unitarian. To defend that position in an era marked by the 1853 Constitution of Argentina, inspired by Federalist principles, he branded all leaders of the Federal party as "pseudo-federalist", without distinguishing between different aspects of Rio Plata federalism.

Another of Zinny's key works was "Efemeridología argirometropolitana hasta la caída del gobierno de Rosas", which gathered much information as possible about all the newspapers published in all provinces since the time of the viceroys until the fall of Juan Manuel de Rosas. It was not a trivial task, as almost a hundred newspapers and similar works were published each year in some periods, especially in the era of Bernardino Rivadavia and the government of Juan Ramón Balcarce. In later work he followed the same procedure for journalism in the Banda Oriental and Uruguay.

Zinny wrote biographical studies, singly or in individual volumes, which are now assembled in one volume with the name of "Estudios biográficos". Two of his other works were the "History of the United Provinces of the River Plate from 1816 to 1818" and "La Gaceta Mercantil de Buenos Aires. 1823–1852".
