= Justo Páez Molina =

Argentine politician

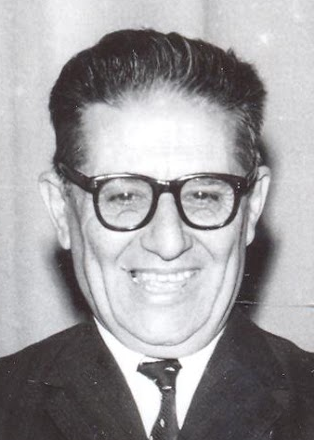
- Argentine politician

52nd Governor of Córdoba
- In office 12 October 1963 – 28 June 1966
- Governor of Córdoba|Lieutenant: Hugo Leonelli
- Preceded by: Rogelio Nores Martínez
- Succeeded by: Gustavo Martínez Zuviría

Personal details
- Born: August 7, 1902 El Salto, Córdoba
- Died: April 22, 1969 (aged 66) Córdoba
- Party: Radical Civic Union
- Profession: Real estate broker

Justo Pastor Páez Molina (August 7, 1902, El Salto, Córdoba – April 22, 1969, Córdoba) was an Argentine politician. He served as Governor of Córdoba from October 12, 1963 to June 28, 1966.

Political offices
Preceded by Rogelio Nores Martínez	Governor of Córdoba; 1963 – 1966	Succeeded by Gustavo Martínez Zuviría
