= Alfredo Demarchi =

Argentine businessman and politician

Engineer Alfredo Demarchi
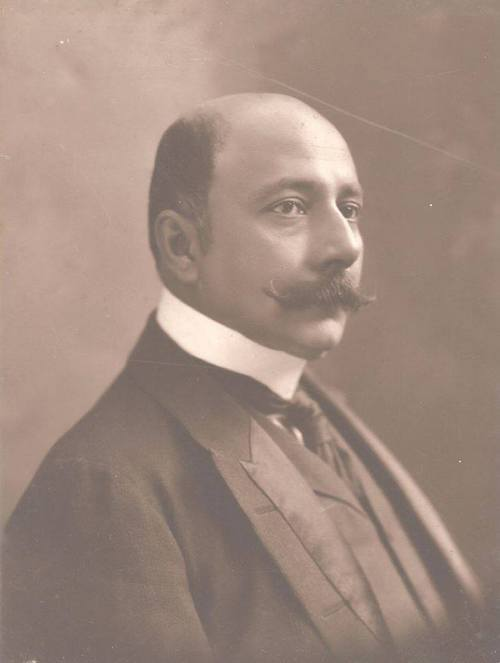

Vice-Governor of Buenos Aires Province
- In office 1 May 1898 – 1 May 1902
- Governor: Bernardo de Irigoyen
- Preceded by: José Inocencio Arias
- Succeeded by: Adolfo Saldías

Minister of Agriculture
- In office 13 September 1917 – 6 March 1922
- President: Hipólito Yrigoyen
- Preceded by: Honorio Pueyrredón
- Succeeded by: Eudoro Vargas Gómez

President of the Compañía Primitiva de Gas de Buenos Aires
- In office 1890–1894

Personal details
- Born: Alfredo Silvestre Demarchi y Quiroga; October 12, 1857 Buenos Aires
- Died: August 16, 1937 (aged 79) Buenos Aires
- Resting place: La Recoleta Cemetery
- Party: Radical Civic Union
- Spouse: Clara Marta Leloir y Sáenz Valiente

Alfredo Demarchi (1857-1937) was an Argentine businessman and politician, who held various state positions, including as Vice Governor of the Province of Buenos Aires.

Since 2004 his fonds are available for consultation in Max von Buch Library of Universidad de San Andrés.

== Biography ==
He was born in Buenos Aires, the son of Antonio Demarchi and Mercedes Quiroga, daughter of Facundo Quiroga, belonging to a distinguished family of Swiss and Creole origin. He completed his elementary and university studies in Europe, and received an engineering degree from the Institute of Technology of Zurich around 1878.

He began his political career in 1894 when he was elected as a national deputy by the Radical Party. He served as Vice Governor between 1898 and 1902, and in 1918 was appointed to occupy the Head of the Ministry of Agriculture and Livestock of Argentina.

== Family ==
Alfredo Demarchi was married to Clara Leloir, daughter of Alejandro Leloir Sáenz Valiente and María del Tránsito Sáenz Valiente. He was the grandson of Facundo Quiroga, and his wife niece granddaughter of Juan Martín de Pueyrredón, prominent politicians and military of Argentina during the 19th century.
