= Governor of Córdoba, Argentina =

Governor of Argentine province

Governor of Córdoba Province (Argentina)
- Provincial coat of Arms

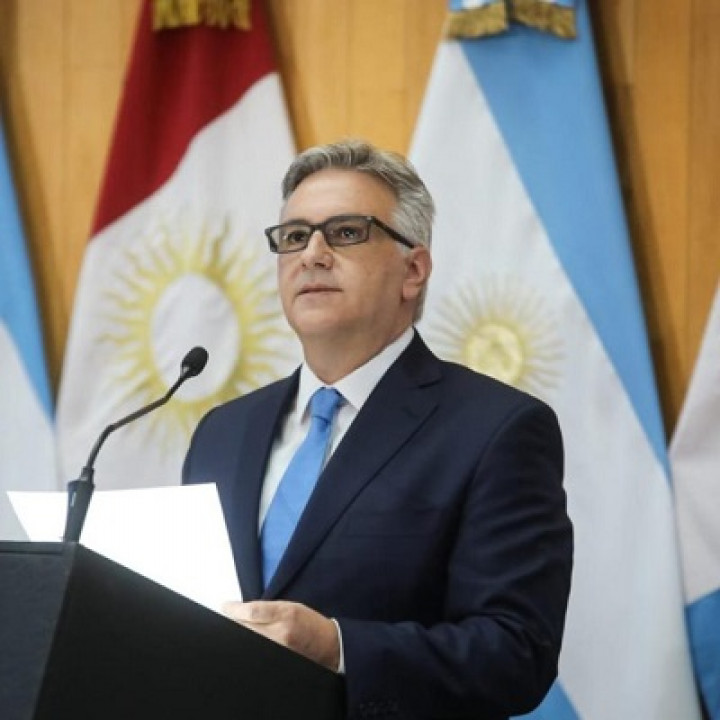
- Incumbent; Martín Llaryora since 10 December 2023
- Appointer: Direct popular vote
- Term length: 4 years
- Inaugural holder: José Javier Díaz (provisional)
- Website: www.cba.gov.ar

This is a list of the governors of Córdoba. The Governor of the Argentine province of Córdoba is the highest executive officer of the province.

== Federal interventors ==
Under the constitutional doctrine of federal intervention, a federal interventor (also intervenor or intervener) has been appointed to govern Córdoba Province, Argentina, on several occasions. On some occasions the federal interventor was formally named Governor of Córdoba.

There are six series of interventors corresponding to the six federal interventions, each itself a product of a military coup d'état. These six coups d'état resulted in de facto governments.

== List ==
#	Name	Title	Term
1	Juan Bautista Bustos	1st Governor	1820–1829
2	José María Paz	Provisional Governor	1829–1829
3	José María Paz	2nd Governor	1829–1831
4	Gregorio Aráoz de Lamadrid	Delegated Governor	1831–1831
5	Mariano Fragueiro	3rd Governor	1831–1831
6	José Roque Funes	4th Governor	1831–1831
7	José Vicente Reynafé	5th Governor	1831–1833
8	José Antonio Reynafé	Provisional Governor	1833–1835
9	Pedro Nolasco Rodríguez	6th Governor	1835–1835
10	Sixto Casanovas	Provisional Governor	1835–1835
11	Andrés Aramburú	Provisional Governor	1835–1835
12	Calixto María González	Provisional Governor	1835–1835
13	Manuel López	Provisional Governor	1835–1836
14	Manuel López	7th Governor	1836–1840
15	José Francisco Álvarez	Provisional Governor	1840–1840
16	Gregorio Aráoz de Lamadrid	Provisional Governor	1840–1840
17	Manuel López	Governor (continuation)	1840–1852
18	José Victorio López	Delegated Governor	1852–1852
19	Alejo Carmen Guzmán	Provisional Governor	1852–1852
20	Alejo Carmen Guzmán	8th Governor	1852–1855
21	Roque Ferreyra	9th Governor	1855–1858
22	Mariano Fragueiro	10th Governor	1858–1860
23	Felix de la Peña	Provisional Governor	1860–1860
24	Felix de la Peña	11th Governor	1860–1861
25	Santiago Derqui	Federal Interventor	1861–1861
26	Fernando Félix de Allende	Federal Interventor	1861–1861
27	Tristán Achaval	Federal Interventor	1861–1861
28	José Alejo Román	Provisional Governor	1861–1861
29	Juan del Campillo	Provisional Governor	1861–1861
30	José Alejo Román	Provisional Governor	1861–1861
31	Felix de la Peña	Governor (continuation)	1861–1861
32	Marcos Paz	Provisional Governor	1861–1862
33	Wenceslao Paunero	Delegated Governor	1862–1862
34	Justiniano Posse	12th Governor	1862–1863
35	Benigno Ocampo	Provisional Governor	1863–1863
36	Roque Ferreyra	Provisional Governor	1863–1864
36	Roque Ferreyra	13th Governor	1864–1866
37	Luis Cáceres	Provisional Governor	1866–1866
38	José Mateo Luque	Provisional Governor	1866–1867
39	José Mateo Luque	14th Governor	1867–1867
40	Félix de la Peña	Provisional Governor	1867–1868
41	Félix de la Peña	15th Governor	1868–1871
42	Juan Antonio Álvarez	16th Governor	1871–1874
43	Enrique Rodríguez	17th Governor	1874–1877
44	Antonio Del Viso	18th Governor	1877–1880
45	Miguel Juárez Celman	19th Governor	1880–1883
46	Gregorio Gavier	20th Governor	1883–1886
47	Ambrosio Olmos	21st Governor	1886–1888
48	José Echenique	22nd Governor	1888–1889
49	Marcos Juárez	23rd Governor	1889–1890
50	Eleazar Garzón	24th Governor	1890–1892
51	Manuel Pizarro	25th Governor	1892–1893
52	Julio Astrada	26th Governor	1893–1895
53	José Figueroa Alcorta	27th Governor	1895–1898
54	Cleto Peña	28th Governor	1898–1898
55	Donaciano del Campillo	29th Governor	1898–1901
56	José Manuel Álvarez	30th Governor	1901–1904
57	José Vicente de Olmos	31st Governor	1904–1905
58	Daniel Fernández	Provisional Governor	1905–1905
59	José Vicente de Olmos	Governor (continuation)	1905–1907
60	José Ortiz y Herrera	32nd Governor	1907–1909
61	Mardoqueo Molina	Provisional Governor	1909–1909
62	Eliseo Cantón	Federal Interventor	1909–1909
63	Manuel Ordoñez	Provisional Governor	1909–1910
64	Absalón Casas	Provisional Governor	1910–1910
65	Felix Garzón	33rd Governor	1910–1913
66	Ramón J. Cárcano	34th Governor	1913–1916
67	Eufrasio Loza	35th Governor	1916–1917
68	Julio Borda	36th Governor	1917–1919
69	Rafael Núñez	37th Governor	1919–1921
70	Jerónimo del Barco	38th Governor	1921–1922
71	Julio A. Roca, Jr.	39th Governor	1922–1925
72	Ramón J. Cárcano	40th Governor	1925–1928
73	Enrique Martínez	41st Governor	1928–1928
74	José Antonio Ceballos	42nd Governor	1928–1930
75	Basilio Pertiné	de facto Federal Interventor	1930–1930
76	Carlos Ibarguren	de facto Federal Interventor	1930–1931
77	Enrique P. Torino	de facto Federal Interventor	1931–1932
78	Emilio Olmos	43rd Governor	1932–1932
79	Pedro J. Frías	44th Governor	1932–1936
80	Julio Torres	Provisional Governor	1936–1936
81	Luis Funes	Provisional Governor	1936–1936
82	Amadeo Sabattini	45th Governor	1936–1940
83	Santiago del Castillo	46th Governor	1940–1943
84	Justo Salazar Collado	de facto Federal Interventor	1943–1943
85	Alfredo Córdoba	de facto Federal Interventor	1943–1943
86	Eduardo Gonella	de facto Federal Interventor	1943–1943
87	Leon Scasso	de facto Federal Interventor	1943–1944
88	Manuel Ferrer	de facto Federal Interventor	1944–1944
89	Alberto Guglielmone	de facto Federal Interventor	1944–1944
90	Juan Carlos Díaz Cisneros	de facto Federal Interventor	1944–1945
91	Walter Villegas	de facto Federal Interventor	1945–1945
92	Hugo Oderigo	de facto Federal Interventor	1945–1946
93	Argentino Auchter	47th Governor	1946–1947
94	Román Subiza	Federal Interventor	1947–1947
95	Aristóbulo Vargas Belmonte	Federal Interventor	1947–1949
96	Alfredo Eguzquiza	Federal Interventor	1949–1949
97	Juan I. San Martín	48th Governor	1949–1951
98	Atilio Antinucci	49th Governor	1951–1952
99	Raúl Lucini	50th Governor	1952–1955
100	Dalmiro Videla Balaguer	de facto Federal Interventor	1955–1956
101	Medardo Gallardo Valdés	de facto Federal Interventor	1956–1958
102	Arturo Zanichelli	51st Governor	1958–1960
103	Francisco de Larrechea	Federal Interventor	1960–1961
104	Jorge Bermúdez Emparanza	Federal Interventor	1961–1962
105	Mario Atencio	Federal Interventor	1962–1962
106	Aniceto Pérez	de facto Federal Interventor	1962–1962
107	Rogelio Nores Martínez	de facto Federal Interventor	1962–1963
108	Justo Páez Molina	52nd Governor	1963–1966
109	Gustavo Martínez Zuviría	de facto Federal Interventor	1966–1966
110	Miguel A. Ferrer Deheza	de facto Federal Interventor	1966–1968
111	Carlos Caballero	de facto Federal Interventor	1966–1969
112	Jorge Carcagno	de facto Federal Interventor	1969–1969
113	Roberto Huerta	de facto Federal Interventor	1969–1970
114	Juan Carlos Reyes	de facto Federal Interventor	1970–1970
115	Bernardo Bas	de facto Federal Interventor	1970–1971
116	Carlos Gigena Parker	de facto Federal Interventor	1971–1971
117	José C. Uriburu	de facto Federal Interventor	1971–1971
118	Helvio Guozden	de facto Federal Interventor	1971–1973
119	Ricardo Obregón Cano	53rd Governor	1973–1974
120	Mario Agodino	Provisional Governor	1974–1974
121	Duilio Brunello	Federal Interventor	1974–1974
122	Raúl Lacabanne	Federal Interventor	1974–1975
123	José A. Luján	Provisional Governor	1975–1975
124	Raúl Bercovich Rodríguez	Federal Interventor	1975–1976
125	José Vaquero	de facto Federal Interventor	1976–1976
126	Carlos Chasseing	de facto Federal Interventor	1976–1979
127	Miguel Marini	de facto Federal Interventor	1979–1979
128	Adolfo Sigwald	de facto Federal Interventor	1979–1982
129	Rubén Pellanda	de facto Federal Interventor	1982–1983
130	Eduardo Angeloz	54th Governor	1983–1995
131	Ramón Mestre	55th Governor	1995–1999
132	José Manuel De la Sota	56th Governor	1999–2007
133	Juan Schiaretti	57th Governor	2007–2011
134	José Manuel De la Sota	58th Governor	2011–2015
133	Juan Schiaretti	59th Governor	2015–2023
134	Martín Llaryora	60th Governor	2023–

Official Government Site

== See also ==
- Legislature of Córdoba
- Politics of Argentina
