= Bernardo Houssay Award =

- Named for Bernardo Houssay
- Awarded for: Outstanding science and research work
- Sponsored by: Ministry of Science, Technology and Productive Innovation
- Country: Argentina
- First award: 2003
- Website: www.investigadordelanacion.mincyt.gob.ar

The Bernardo Houssay Award (Spanish: Premio Bernardo Houssay) is a distinction awarded by Argentina's Ministry of Science, Technology and Productive Innovation to honor outstanding work by scientists and researchers. The Ministry selects recipients annually through a jury of prominent scientists. Presented by the President of Argentina, it is one of the country's most prestigious prizes in the field of science and engineering.

The award's name is a tribute to the doctor Bernardo Houssay, an Argentine Nobel Prize recipient. The Jorge Sabato Award is named in honor of an Argentine technology pioneer, and confers a significant sum of money in addition to a medal.

== Distinctions ==
The Houssay Award is aimed at researchers under the age of 45 who carried out most of their scientific activity in Argentina. It recognizes work in each of four areas: physics, mathematics, and computer science; chemistry, biochemistry and molecular biology; medical sciences; and social sciences (which includes psychology, educational sciences, sociology, law, demography, geography and political science).

The Houssay Career Award is given in the same categories, but to those over 45.

The Jorge Sabato Award (first given in 2013) goes to researchers who excel in technology transfer and developments with economic-productive impact in sectors critical to the country's growth.

The Researcher of the Nation Distinction was instituted in 2009. It is organized by the Ministry of Science, Technology and Productive Innovation through the Secretariat for Planning and Policies in Science, Technology, and Productive Innovation. The winner is selected among the recipients of the other three awards.

The jury is composed of notable national scientific figures, and according to the Minister of Science, Technology and Productive Innovation, Lino Barañao:

Through these awards it is the Argentine State that distinguishes and honors outstanding people from the scientific-technological system. This award is a very important practice for the management of our scientific policy, because it highlights the essential place that science and technology have in the development of the country.

Each winner receives a diploma, a medal, and a monetary prize. These are personally presented by the President of the Nation and the Minister of Science and Technology, either at the Casa Rosada or the headquarters of the Argentine Scientific Society.

In 2010 and 2011, the Rebeca Gerschman Award was also presented to women researchers over 60 years of age, which consisted of a gold medal.

== History ==
The award was created by the national government through Law 25.467, Article 25 in 2001.

It was first presented in 2003 as the "Bernardo Houssay Awards for Scientific-Technological Research". They were given in three categories: Career, Consolidated Researcher, and Young Researcher.

== Recipients ==
=== Researcher of the Nation ===
- Esteban Brignole (2009)
- Alberto Kornblihtt (2010)
- Roberto Juan José Williams (2011)
- Ana Belén Elgoyhen (2012)
- Juan Pablo Paz (2014)
- Noemí Zaritzky (2015)
- Gabriel Rabinovich (2016)
- Diego de Mendoza (2017)
- Conrado Varotto (2018)

=== Houssay Award ===
- José Alberto Castro (1996)
- Regina Wikinski (1997)
- Aída Pesce de Ruiz Holgado (1998)
- María Marta de Elizalde de Bracco (1999)
- Ana Belén Elgoyhen (2000)
- Otto Orsingher (2000)
- Ricardo A. Margni (2001)
- Héctor N. Torres (2002)
- Jorge Daniel Coussio (2003)
- Miguel Ángel Basombrío (2004)
- Ricardo Norberto Farías (2005)
- Rodolfo Brenner (2006)
- Ramón Piezzi (2007)
- Juan José Poderoso (2008)
- Pedro Cahn (2009)
- Ernesto Schargrodsky (2009)
- Galo Soler Illia (2009)
- Alejandro Blanco (2010)
- María Isabel Colombo (2010)
- José Luis Daniotti (2010)
- Pablo Mininni (2010)
- Gabriel Rabinovich (2010)
- Gustavo Abel Abraham (2011)
- Ernesto Cristallini (2011)
- María Amelia Gutiérrez (2011)
- Hugo Ortega (2011)
- Diego Golombek (2012)
- Mariana Maccioni (2012)
- Carlos Edmundo Lanusse (2013)
- Adrián Luis Lifschitz (2013)
- Silvia Alejandra Manzo (2013)
- Diego Humberto Milone (2013)
- Diego Pol (2013)
- Ana Belén Elgoyhen (2014)
- Vanesa Gottifredi (2014)
- Javier Palatnik (2014)
- Juan Ignacio Piovani (2014)
- Sebastián Uchitel (2014)
- Ezequiel Adamovsky (2015)
- Vera Alejandra Alvarez (2015)
- César Bertucci (2015)
- Paula Casati (2015)
- Gustavo Estevan Gutler (2015)
- Marcelo Marti (2018)
- Santiago Palma (2018)
- Fernando Stefani (2018)
- Gabriel Vommaro (2018)
- Sergio Lambertucci (2020)

=== Houssay Career Award ===
- Ricardo Aníbal Margini (2003)
- Rosa Muchnik de Lederkremer (2003)
- María Antonia Ruth Sautu (2003)
- Máximo Eugenio Valentinuzzi (2003)
- Silvia Maureen Williams (2003)
- Eduardo Nicolás Zerba (2003)
- Juan José Cazzullo (2004)
- José Carlos Chiaramonte (2004)
- Mario Garavaglia (2004)
- Eduardo Agustín Lombardo (2004)
- Martín Juan Urbicain (2004)
- Daniel Pedro Cardinali (2006)
- Alberto Cassano (2006)
- Ana Lía Kornblit (2006)
- Rafael Calvo (2007)
- Vicente Barros (2009)
- Rodolfo Brenner (2009)
- Esteban Brignole (2009)
- Horacio Cingolani (2009)
- Jorge Víctor Crisci (2009)
- Ezequiel Gallo (2009)
- Emilio de Ípola (2009)
- Jorge Zgrablich (2009)
- Francisco de la Cruz (2010)
- María Marta de Elizalde de Bracco (2010)
- Alberto Kornblihtt (2010)
- Juan Carlos Torre (2010)
- Noemí María Girbal-Blacha (2011)
- Félix Mirabel (2011)
- Jorge Helio Morello (2011)
- Roberto Juan José Williams (2011)
- Ricardo Durán (2012)
- Ana Belén Elgoyhen (2012)
- Elizabeth Jelin (2012)
- Hugo Maccioni (2012)
- Sandra Díaz (2013)
- Eduardo Natalio Dvorkin (2013)
- Gustavo Gabriel Politis (2013)
- Carlos Washington Rapela (2013)
- Elsa Damonte (2014)
- Alberto Frasch (2014)
- Juan Pablo Paz (2014)
- Alfredo Pucciarelli (2014)
- Jorge Eugenio Dotti (2015)
- Luis Antonio Spaletti (2015)
- Noemí Zaritzky (2015))
- Juana Chessa de Silber (2018)
- Lorenzo Lamattina (2018)
- Alberto Porto (2018)
- Conrado Varotto (2018)

=== Rebeca Gerschman Award ===
- Elena Chiozza (2010)
- Ester Susana Hernández (2010)
- Eugenia Sacerdote de Lustig (2010)
- Norma Sbarbati de Nudelman (2010)
- Marta Dolores Mudry (2011)
- Matilde Nicolini (2011)
- Marta Rosen (2011)

=== Jorge Sabato Award ===
- Raquel Chan (2012)
- Carlos Alberto Querini (2013)
- Hugo Luján (2014)
- Hugo Gramajo (2015)
- Fernando Goldbaum (2018)

=== Bernardo Houssay Consolidated Researcher Award ===
- María Cristina Añón (2003)
- Ricardo Bertoldo Kratje (2003)
- Luis Alberto Borrero (2003)
- Daniel Corach (2003)
- Carlos Santiago Andreo (2003)
- Daniel Schávelzon (2003)
- Carlos Washington Rapela (2003)
- Patricia María Frontini (2004)
- Andrés Juan Kreiner (2004)
- Ernesto Jorge Podesta (2004)
- María Cristina Richaud de Minzi (2004)
- Enrique Marcelo Valles (2004)
- Carlos Apesteguía (2006)
- Diego de Mendoza (2006)
- Susana Romano Sued (2006)
- Roberto Salvarezza (2006)

=== Bernardo Houssay Young Researcher Award ===
- Daniel Domínguez (2003)
- Diego Golombek (2003)
- María Fernanda Beigel(2003)
- María Luján Ferreira (2003)
- Inés Moisset (2003)
- Irina Podgorny (2003)
- Gabriel Rabinovich (2003)
- Daniel de Florian (2004)
- Luis Eduardo Juanico (2004)
- Diego Germán Lamas (2004)
- Ernesto Schargrodsky (2004)
- Marcelo Javier Yanovsky (2004)
- Luis Ignacio Alvarez (2006)
- Adolfo Fabián Gil (2006)
- Adriana Cristina Serquis (2006)
- Galo Soler Illia (2006)
- Patricia Beatriz Tissera (2006)
