= Ana Belén Elgoyhen =

Argentine molecular biologist

Ana Belén Elgoyhen (born 13 December 1959) is an Argentine scientist, professor of pharmacology at the University of Buenos Aires and independent researcher of the National Scientific and Technical Research Council (Spanish: Consejo Nacional de Investigaciones Científicas y Técnicas, CONICET).

She is internationally recognized for her contributions to the understanding of the molecular basis of hearing (sense). Her work could be useful to treat auditory deficiencies and other hearing pathologies.

== Biography ==
Ana Belén Elgoyhen was born on 13 December 1959 in Buenos Aires, Argentina. In 1984 she graduated in biochemistry from the University of Buenos Aires. She received her PhD in biochemistry from the same university, under the supervision of Edda Adler de Graschinsky.

After being selected for the Pew Scholars Program in the Biomedical Sciences in 1991, Elgoyhen left Argentina to begin her post-doctoral studies in the laboratory of molecular neurobiology of the Institute Salk, California. In 1994, Elgoyhen identified the receptors in the human ear that take part in the processes of modulation of the sounds and making them comprehensible. After her postdoctoral training, Elgoyhen returned to Argentina on 24 September 1994.

She was, between 1997 and 2011, International Scholar of the Howard Hughes Medical Institute and Fellow of John Simon Guggenheim Memorial Foundation between 2003 and 2004. She won in 2008 the L'Oreal-UNESCO Awards for Women in Science, which recognizes outstanding women scientists who have contributed to scientific progress for her contributions in the understanding of the fundamental molecular principles of the hearing. The others 2008 recipients were Lihadh Al-Gazali (United Arab Emirates), Elizabeth Blackburn (United States), V. Narry Kim (South Korea) and Ada Yonath (Israel).

In the 2012, the Argentine vice-president Amado Boudou and the Argentine minister of Science, Technology and Productive Innovation, Lino Barañao, awarded her the title of 2012 "Researcher of the Argentine Nation" for her work on the genetics and physiology of the human ears.

Elgoyhen is working as superior researcher at the Institute of Investigations in Genetic Engineering and Molecular Biology "Dr. Héctor N. Torres", as adjunct professor of pharmacology in the Faculty of Medicine of the University of Buenos Aires since 2001, and as adjunct professor to the department of otorhinolaryngology of the School of Medicine of University Johns Hopkins since 2009.

== Prizes and distinctions ==
Year	Award	Work
1988	Sociedad Argentina de Farmacología Experimental	"Efectos de las benzodiazepinas sobre la liberación de 3H-noradrenalina y sobre las respuestas cronotrópicas al estímulo nervioso en aurículas de rata"
1992	Prize CEDIQUIFA in pharmacology	
1994	Verum Foundation for Behavior and Environment (Germany)	"Cloning and functional expression of Alpha9: a novel acetylcholine-gated ion channel"
1995	Strauss Foundation Award in Auditory Science (United States)	
1997	Penny and Bob Fox Award in Auditory Science (United States)	
2000	Bernardo Houssay Award	"Clonado y caracterización funcional del receptor nicotínico involucrado en el control eferente del sistema auditivo y vestibular"
2002	Bernardo Houssay Award in Pharmacology	
2003	Joan and Marc Millar Award in Auditory Science (United States)	
2003	Prize "Joven Sobresaliente" (Fundación Vasco Argentina Juan de Garay)	
2004	Member of the Collegium Oto-Rhino-Laryngologicum Amicitiae Sacrum	
2005	H.F. Lenfest Award in Auditory Science	
2008	L'Oréal-UNESCO Awards for Women in Science for Latin America	
2008	Outstanding Personality of the Science of the Autonomous City of Buenos Aires	
2011	TWAS Prize in Biology	
2012	Investigadora de la Nación Argentina 2012	
2013	Platinum Konex Award in Science and Technology – Basic Biomedical Sciences	
2014	Bernardo Houssay Award	
2023	Konex Award in Science and Technology – Basic Biomedical Sciences	
