= Poper Scientific Stand up =

Poper Scientific Stand Up is the first Latin American stand-up comedy group that is engaged in the popularization of science. It is an independent continuation of an early 2015 initiative by Diego Golombek, which was made in conjunction with the Ministry of Science, Technology and Innovation, Tecnopolis and TECtv. The proposal was to invite university students and graduates of different science fields to participate in a Scientific Stand Up comedy course given by renowned humorist Diego Wainstein, for them to create monologues with scientific content. Using the Stand Up format as a resource, they speak about scientific topics to all age groups, whether they have previous knowledge or not, and they also talk about scientists as people and about the perception of science in society. The name "Poper" is a pun on the initials of "Popularización Entre Risas" (Popularizing Among Laughter), and a tribute to Epistemologist Karl Popper.

== Origins and formation ==
In early 2015, the Argentine Ministry of Science, Technology and Innovation, along with Tecnopolis and TECtv, organized the first Argentine course of Scientific Stand Up, in order to provide innovative teaching tools for the popularization of science. About 200 people enrolled in the course, and 30 were selected to take part in it, chosen for their scientific, artistic and general backgrounds. Those selected were undergraduates, graduates and researchers who had developed different activities in several scientific institutions in Argentina. The course content included several stand-up techniques such as character building, creating stand-up routines, jokes building, working with props and microphones, vocal work, body language, and communication with the public. During the course, each participant produced monologues that were later exhibited in Tecnopolis, under the name "Humor Científico," in 18 shows. They were well received by a diverse audience, which was composed mainly by people outside scientific fields, reaching around 900 spectators a show. After the completion of this course, some of its graduates formed Poper Scientific Stand Up.

== Members ==
Currently Poper consists of 18 members (9 women and 9 men). They range from undergraduates, graduates and researchers, and they cover various areas of knowledge.

Aramburu, Roxana

She graduated in Biology and PhD in Natural Sciences from the National University of La Plata. She is head of practical work and adscripta researcher at the Faculty of Natural Sciences (UNLP). She has published her research, mainly in bird ecology in numerous local and foreign scientific journals. She trained in acting and playwriting in La Plata and Buenos Aires. As a playwright, it has more than thirty plays of her own. She received 16 distinctions and awards from national and foreign institutions for their theatrical texts. In 2014 she was elected to Authors Argentinas cycle, the Teatro Nacional Cervantes.

Chiaramoni, Nadia

She graduated in Biotechnology National University of Quilmes and a PhD in Basic and Applied Sciences. She is currently a research assistant CONICET and studies drug transport systems. She is a university professor and directs fellows, postgraduate students, and seminarians. Dr. Chiaramoni has numerous publications in international journals. She made different courses Stand-Up and script workshop. She participated as a comedian Stand up-Eros (Complejo La Plaza) and as a producer and actor in "A Touch of Evil" in Absinth, Comedy Club. Nadia currently presents a weekly in-person "Positive Mind" in Absinth, La Casa de la Comedia.

Corapi, Enrique

It is Lic. in Science. Biological, Master in Biomedical Sciences and is currently doing his PhD in functional glycomics applied to Cancer, in the Faculty of Natural Sciences of the University of Buenos Aires a scholarship of CONICET. He worked on various television programs Production and recreational events performance in Science "Luigi and brain; technical advisor, production in the Doctors program Telefe and technical advisor, production and performance in the program "La Nave de Marley" TELEFE. It also participated in numerous activities of university extension in FCEN, UBA as the Night of the Museums and Chemistry Week.

Corapi, Luis

He graduated in Chemistry. He studied Food Engineering and works in water purification in aysa. He worked on various television programs such as production and performance in recreational events Science "Luigi and brain; technical advisor, production in the Doctors program TELEFE and technical advisor, production and performance in the program "La Nave de Marley" Telefe. De Almeida, Julian

He graduated in Biology from the University of Buenos Aires and a PhD in Neurosciences received at the University of Barcelona. He has several publications in international journals. He is the author of the book Part of Existence, a biologist for Latin America. He was interviewed on various radio programs as an author and also has many publications on-line "Part of existence."

Farina, Martin Ezequiel

He is a student of paleontology in University of Buenos Aires. He participated in many outreach projects such as in Tecnopolis and Argentine Museum of Natural Sciences. It gives talks in schools on the Integral Nature Reserve and Laguna de Rocha Mixed. He studied theater since he was 10 years and participated in several productions as an actor, producer and assistant director. Also he participated in the development and production of various TV programs as "El Rastro Fossil" and "Museodinámica" and was co-director and scriptwriter along with Andrés Pujol and Daniel Sanchez of "MonteGrandeando"; short historical disclosure about the city of Monte Grande. Radio columnist was "Cancels Siesta" program, among others.

Fernandez Piana, Lucas

He holds a degree in Mathematics from the University of Buenos Aires. He is currently a Fellow of CONICET pursuing a PhD in UBA. His area of interest is the statistical models specifically robust regression on functional data. He is a university professor and studied theater, improvisation, acrobatics and aerial floor, circus and clown. Currently a member of the unpronounceable group dedicated to improvisational theater.

Garcia de Souza, Javier

He graduated in Biology and Doctor of Natural Sciences National University of La Plata. Currently is a Research Assistant CONICET works in aquatic ecology and organic aquaculture. He published scientific articles in national and international journals, technical reports and transfer jobs linked to organic aquaculture. He teaches, extension and scientist. He made several theater courses, physical training for the actor and contemporary dance. I was cast 4 15 plays and dance theater. Currently it integrates two dance theater companies (Espiardanza and La pecueca) and directs two works registered in his name.

Gilles, Facundo

He graduated in Physics at the University of Buenos Aires. Currently is finishing his PhD on the study of solid-state nanochannels modified with polyelectrolyte monolayers, with a PhD scholarship given by CONICET. He has published his work in international journals. He is interested in computational modelling at the interface between physics and chemistry, spread of science through non-conventional ways and teaching science. He is working as teacher assistant at the National University of La Plata. and performed various tasks of popularization of science through his participation in the famous Argentinian park of science: Tecnópolis. Other known abilities: folklore and salsa dancer.

Hoijemberg, Mauro He is a student of Biology and Technical Garden of the University of Buenos Aires. He held a workshop in improvisational theater. He participated in the production and performance of Parripollo TV and PEUHEC-UBA (university extension program in school and community gardens). He teaches chemistry at the secondary level and was professor of educational workshop for children garden and urban agriculture workshop.

Kristoff, Gisela

She is Biochemistry and a PhD in chemistry from the University of Buenos Aires. He is Research Associate at CONICET. Directs his research group: Ecotoxicology Acuática- native invertebrates. He is a university professor and director of research, postgraduate students graduate, doctoral and master. He has numerous publications in international journals and popular articles. He is a member of C. Board of the Society of Environmental Toxicology and Chemistry. He worked in university extension leading a project: Science Re-creative, at book fairs, gardens, Chemical Week and Night of Museums. He dramaturgy and camera courses and studied theater since 2009. He performed in 8 plays and 3 short.

Marcias, Maria Laura

She graduated in Cs. Biological, Aquatic Biology orientation and is pursuing the Specialization in Public Communication of Science and Technology at the University of Buenos Aires. It is diver and dance Hip Hop. He participated in various tasks extension and popularization of science: in Tecnopolis, Museum Night, Book Fair and the Week of Biology (UBA). It is volunteer Whale Conservation Institute and participated for 7 years in writing articles for boys disclosure on the conservation of whales and the environment (List Franca Junior).

Olivieri, Vanesa

She graduated in Biology, University of Buenos Aires, environmentalist. He made various stand-up courses and participated as a comedian and producer in fixed shows as "sharp" and "From to 2". He was a finalist in National contest the first Stand Up and participated in the Festival Emergent City. He also courses improvisation and comedy. Otero, Laura

With a degree in Biotechnology and Molecular Genetics orientation technique graduated Laboratory National University of Quilmes. He has teaching experience, he participated in various research projects and has experience in university teaching. He made various courses Stand Up and humorous writing workshop. He also appeared in different places, having a weekly show.

Rodriguez, Victoria

He is a student of biology at the University of Buenos Aires and Performing Arts. He participated in various tasks of university extension and outreach such as being guide Tecnopolis.

Saint Esteven, Alejandro

He graduated in Biology with a concentration in Animal Morphology and Systematics graduated from the University of Buenos Aires. He is currently doing a PhD with a scholarship UBA. He participated in various university extension tasks such as being educational guide at the Argentine Museum, instructor Argentine sign language, Biology Week (FCEN), Night of the Museums. As an actor I had regular presentations at the fair of science and technology Tecnopolis and the Tunnel of Sciences.

Saponara, Juliana

She graduated in Astronomy graduate of the National University of La Plata. He is currently doing a doctorate in astronomy with a scholarship of CONICET. He participated in various extension work and the Expo-University astronomy workshop for kids, talk outreach Planetarium and worked at the Extension Department of Astronomy and Geophysics. He made various courses of theater, clown, mime and improvisation and had different artistic presentations.

Sganga, Daniela

She graduated in Biology, graduated from the University of Buenos Aires, focusing on systematic animal and morphology. He is currently a fellow of CONICET and doctoral student at the UBA. His research topic is the reproduction of crustaceans. He made several courses of theater, circus and gymnastics. He served as a teacher in secondary and university level in various subjects. He participated in various activities to popularize science, as the week of Biology, organized by the Faculty of Natural Sciences (UBA) and Night of the Museums and formed part of the area biology in multidisciplinary projects with the Speleological Group Argentino.

== 2016 National Tour ==
In May 2016 begins in Tandil (Buenos Aires) national tour that took them to travel 10 cities in 7 provinces throughout Argentina Republic along with a presentation in the city of Montevideo:

- September 23, 2016: 'Provincial Science Week' , Ushuaia, Tierra del Fuego.
- September 22, 2016: 'Provincial Science Week' , Río Grande, Tierra del Fuego.
- September 14, 2016: 'Humor Guanaco' Puerto Madryn, Chubut.
- September 7, 2016: 'Forum CILAC - Unesco' , Montevideo, Uruguay.
- August 26, 2016: 'Science Week' Rafaela, Santa Fe.
- August 10, 2016: 'XIX National Congress of Archaeology' Tucumán.
- June 7, 2016: 'Week Provincial Science and Productive Innovation' , Neuquen Capital.
- June 6, 2016: 'Pomona / Luis Beltran / Choele Choel' (high schools). Rio Negro.
- May 19, 2016: 'Day Extension Mercosur' Tandil, Buenos Aires.

== Presentations ==
Poper is characterized by a wide range of audience reception in both scientific fields and which are totally unrelated to the subject. So much so that it has regularly presented in such different spaces between them as comedy clubs or scientific congresses, through secondary schools, Weddings and other private events. The group not only offers shows, but also provides workshops Scientific Communication. Among its outstanding presentations can mention the 2015 season Tecnopolis, the weekly show Absinth, the House of Comedy and regular show at the Cultural Center of Science:

- September 30, 2016: 'College of Our Lady of Monte Grande' Esteban Echeverria, Buenos Aires.
- September 29, 2016: 'University of the East' , La Plata, Buenos Aires.
- September 23, 2016: 'Provincial Science Week' , Ushuaia, Tierra del Fuego.
- September 22, 2016: 'Provincial Science Week' , Río Grande, Tierra del Fuego.
- September 7, 2016: 'Forum CILAC - Unesco' , Montevideo, Uruguay.
- August 28, 2016: 'CONICET Room Tecnopolis' San Martin, Buenos Aires.
- August 26, 2016: 'Science Week' Rafaela, Santa Fe.
- August 18, 2016: 'D.Rocha' , Buenos Aires.
- August 10, 2016: 'XIX National Congress of Archaeology' Tucumán.
- July 30, 2016: 'Telefónica Foundation' CABA.
- July 12, 2016: 'Liceo Bachelor No. 4' , CABA.
- June 27, 2016: 'Colegio Galileo Galilei' CABA.
- June 7, 2016: 'Week Provincial Science and Productive Innovation' , Neuquen Capital.
- June 6, 2016: 'Pomona / Luis Beltran / Choele Choel (high schools),' Rio Black.
- May 19, 2016: 'Day Extension Mercosur' Tandil, Buenos Aires.
- May 14, 2016: 'Contrasendios Cultural Center' Quilmes, Buenos Aires.
- March 14, 2016: 'National University of Quilmes' opening Semester Show. Quilmes, Buenos Aires.
- March 12, 2016: The Night of the Bookshops' CABA.
- March 11, 2016: 'Tecnox' Workshop scientists monologues and dissemination of science. CABA.
- February 14, 2016: 'Platense Tomato Festival' , La Plata, Buenos Aires.
- December 2015 – Present: 'Cultural Center of Science' . biweekly show. Polo Science and Technology. CABA.
- November 6, 2015: 'National Science Fair Club' . Minas, Uruguay.
- November 2, 2015: 'University of San Andrés' , Buenos Aires.
- October 31, 2015: 'Night of Museums' Faculty of Cs. Natural, UBA. CABA.
- October 30, 2015: 'Halloween Night', Argentine Museum of Natural Sciences. CABA.
- October 16, 2015: 'San Roman Institute' CABA.
- October 15, 2015: 'University of Quilmes' . Show closing 2nd Conference of PhD students and advanced students of science and technology. Quilmes.
- October 8, 2015: 'Closing the CONICET Games' Chapadmalal, Buenos Aires.
- October 5, 2015: 'Chemistry Week' , Faculty of Cs. Natural, UBA. CABA.
- September 16, 2015: 'Talks POP' , "Removing the street knowledge" Nestor Kirchner Cultural Center. CABA.
- September 19, 2015: Youth for Victory , La Plata.
- September 2015: 'Bollini Bar' CABA.
- October 2015 - March 2016: 'Absinth, La Casa de la Comedia' CABA. Show weekly on Fridays.
- August–September 2015: 'Comedy Club' , La Plata.
- July 2015 - November 2015: 'Tecnopolis' San Martin. Show weekly on Saturdays.

== TV ==
In October 2016 the signal TECtv announced it is working on a TV show with the comedian Poper group and Dalia Gutmann. It was filmed in the Crash Hall of the City of Buenos Aires, the Polo Scientific Technology and Avenida Corrientes.

== Curiosities ==
- In the show Tecnopolis was used as opening and closing the soundtrack of the film Star Wars, however during shows at La Casa de la Comedia they used Baby's on Fire by Die Antwoord.
- The Tecnopolis debut was against 945 people and after the first weekend had joined more than 3,000 people in four shows.
- A confusing situation lived in Tecnopolis when one of the weekly functions in Ship Science was suspended because the stage was being used for a conference of Evangelical Pastors as part of Jesus Fest.
- The first show for schools did in the Belgrano San Roman College, where he was attending in the 60s known rock musician Luis Alberto Spinetta.
- Many of the members had had a relationship in the past not only as fellow scientists, if not sharing scenarios, such as student-teacher or outreach projects.
- Were hosts at the Awards Tecnox 2015 (Latin American Students Applying Technologies). Its function was to conduct the ceremony sandwiching comedy acts. However, minutes before the start, a blackout surprised all the Aula Magna of the Faculty of Natural Sciences where prizes were given. True to the style of the group took the situation with humor and conducted the ceremony illuminated by a single lamp, cell and a pair of lanterns lit from the public.
- The thematic variety of the group went beyond the artistic and several members who were not known for his scientific work to be completed different disciplines together in publishing scientific journals.
- They have shared the stage with the group of scientists monologues Uruguayans "Scientific Bardo" both Montevideo and Buenos Aires.

== Acknowledgments ==
In December 2015 they received the "I love what you do" that delivers the renowned broadcaster Carlos Ulanovsky Award of LRA Radio Nacional
