= María Antonia Ruth Sautu =

Argentine sociologist and methodologist

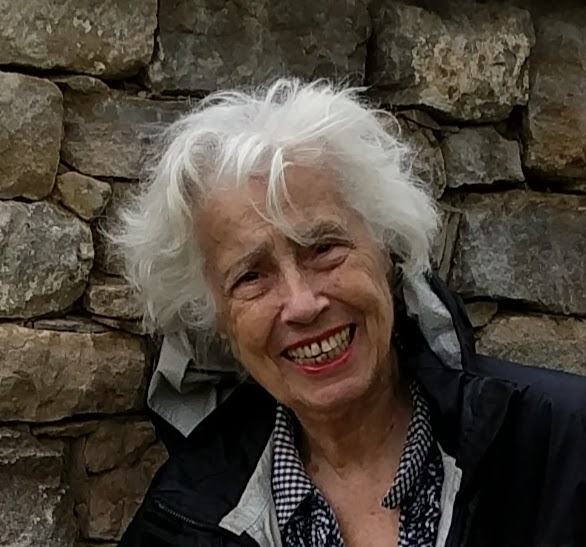
- Born: 25 February 1932 (age 93); Buenos Aires, Argentina
- Education: University of Buenos Aires; London School of Economics
- Occupation: Sociologist
- Awards: Konex Award (1986); Bernardo Houssay Award (2004)

María Antonia Ruth Sautu (born 25 February 1932) is an Argentine sociologist and methodologist.

She is a professor emeritus at the University of Buenos Aires (UBA), and she works as a researcher and project director at its Gino Germani Research Institute. She is also a member of the National Academy of Education.

She received the Bernardo Houssay Career Award in 2004.

== Academic career ==
María Antonia Ruth Sautu was born in Buenos Aires on 25 February 1932. She earned a bachelor's degree as a national public accountant at UBA in 1952. She also studied economics at the same university, obtaining a licentiate in 1960.

She did postgraduate studies at the UBA's Faculty of Philosophy and Letters, and in 1962 she obtained a Certificate of Sociological Studies for Graduates from its Department of Sociology. After completing her postgraduate studies, she moved to England in 1969, for which she obtained scholarships from the Ford Foundation, the National Scientific and Technical Research Council (CONICET) and the Torcuato di Tella Institute. At the London School of Economics, she completed a doctorate in economics with a focus in sociology, with the thesis Economic Development and Stratification in Argentina: 1869–1955.

Sautu returned to Argentina and devoted herself fully to university teaching and research, working at various institutions. She was an associate researcher at the di Tella Institute's Center for Social Research from 1964 to 1974, and was also an associate researcher at Harvard University's Population Center, under the direction of professor Gino Germani, from March to April 1969. She has been a profesora titular regular of the Chair of Methodology and Techniques of Social Research of the sociology program of UBA's Faculty of Social Sciences since 1986. Since 2005, she has held her profesora regular role as a professor emeritus at UBA.

She has also written several books, including El empresario y la innovación (1972) and Manual de Metodología. Construcción del marco teórico, formulación de los objetivos y elección de la metodología (2005). She has also been the compiler and author of journal articles such as "Práctica de la Investigación Cuantitativa y Cualitativa. Articulación entre la Teoría, los Métodos y las Técnicas" (2007).

== Public service ==
From December 1983 to December 1987, Sautu served as Undersecretary of Industry and Commerce of the Economy Ministry of Buenos Aires Province. From May 1988 to May 1989, she was a cabinet advisor to the national executive branch's Secretariat of Housing and Environmental Management.

Also, from June to December 1989, she served as Senior Industrial Development Officer of the United Nations Industrial Development Organization (UNIDO) in Vienna.

Sautu participated in science and technology studies that led to the design of national laws and programs for science and technology. From 1997 to 2005, she was a member of the Evaluation Commission for scientific quality certificates at the Ministry of Science, Technology, and Productive Innovation.

== Awards and distinctions ==
- 1986: Konex Diploma of Merit in Sociology
- 2004: Bernardo Houssay Career Award
- 2011: Lifetime Achievement Award at UBA's 190th anniversary

== Selected publications ==
- Teoría y medición del estatus ocupacional - Escalas ocupacionales, objetivos y de prestigio (in Spanish) (1st ed.). University of Buenos Aires. 1992. ISBN 978-950-29-0072-8.
- Los pobres y la escuela (in Spanish) (1st ed.). La Colmena. 1996. ISBN 978-987-9028-03-2. (coauthor with Ana María Eichelbaum de Babini)
- El método biográfico – La reconstrucción de la sociedad a partir del testimonio de los actores (in Spanish) (1st ed.). Editorial de Belgrano. 1999. ISBN 978-950-577-269-8.
- Mujer, trabajo y pobreza en la Argentina (in Spanish) (1st ed.). National University of La Plata. 1999. ISBN 978-950-34-0152-1. (coauthor with Amalia Eguía)
- La trastienda de la investigación (in Spanish) (1st ed.). Lumiere. 2000. ISBN 978-950-9603-28-8. (coauthor with Catalina Wainerman)
- La gente sabe - Interpretaciones de la clase media acerca de la libertad, la igualdad, el éxito y la justicia (in Spanish) (1st ed.). Lumiere. 2005. ISBN 978-950-9603-36-3.
- Todo es teoría – Objetivos y métodos de investigación (in Spanish) (1st ed.). Lumiere. 2005. ISBN 978-950-9603-57-8.
- Catálogo de prácticas corruptas - Corrupción, confianza y democracia (in Spanish) (1st ed.). Lumiere. 2005. ISBN 978-950-9603-65-3.
- Manual de metodología – Construcción del marco teórico, formulación de los objetivos y elección de la metodología (PDF) (in Spanish) (1st reprint ed.). Latin American Council of Social Sciences. 2006. ISBN 978-987-1183-32-6. (coauthor)
- Relatos y miradas de prácticas electorales en el norte argentino (in Spanish) (1st ed.). University of Buenos Aires. 2006. ISBN 978-950-29-0929-5.
- Psicología social y política - Procesos teóricos y estudios aplicados (in Spanish) (1st ed.). Eudeba. 2014. ISBN 978-950-23-2317-6. (collective work)
- Economía, clases sociales y estilos de vida (in Spanish) (1st ed.). Lumiere. 2016. ISBN 978-987-603-120-2.
- Teorías y métodos en la investigación de la cultura (in Spanish) (1st ed.). University of Buenos Aires. 2016. ISBN 978-950-29-1598-2.
- Recorridos de la indagación social empírica: cómo construimos el problema de investigación y elaboramos el marco teórico (in Spanish) (1st ed.). University of Buenos Aires. 2017. ISBN 978-950-29-1615-6. (coauthor with Betina Freidin and María Mercedes Di Virgilio)
