= Irina Podgorny =

Argentine anthropologist (born 1963)

- Born: 1963 (age 62–63); Quilmes, Argentina
- Occupations: Anthropologist; Historian
- Notable work: See "Bibliography"
- Awards: Bernardo Houssay Award

Irina Podgorny (born 1963) is an Argentine anthropologist, a historian of science at the National University of La Plata, permanent staff at CONICET, professor ad honorem and Director of the Archive of History and Photographs at the Natural Science Facility and Museum of the National University of La Plata, and winner of the Bernardo Houssay Young Researcher Award. She has held numerous professorships and scholarships and has worked for CONICET since 2013.

== Life ==
Irina Podgorny was born in Quilmes, Argentina in 1963. She studied anthropology in La Plata from 1981 to 1987 and then began graduate studies in Social History and History of Ideas at the University of Buenos Aires in 1988, passing in 1993. The next year, she was awarded her Ph.D in anthropology via her thesis. From 2001 to 2012, Podgorny was Professor of History of Science at the University of Quilmes.

In 2002–03, Podgorny was awarded the fellowship of the Humboldt Foundation with Friedrich Kittler and then worked as a visiting scholar in Berlin in 1998 (and again in 2009–11), Paris in 1999, and New York City in 2010. Podgorny has been a visiting professor in Rio de Janeiro from 2000 to 2001, Paris in 2008, at EHESS in 2010, and held the Lewis P. Jones Professorship at Wofford College in South Carolina in 2012.

Since 2013, Podgorny has been a director of a binational research program between CONICET and Université Paris Diderot.

== Bibliography ==
=== Books ===
- Arqueología y Educación: la inclusión de la arqueología pampeana en la educación argentina, 1993
- Endere, María Luz (1999). Arqueología de la educación: Textos, indicios, monumentos: La imagen de los indios en el mundo escolar. Buenos Aires: Sociedad Argentina de Antropología. pp. 212–216. eISSN 1850-373X. ISBN 987-97121-3-7.
- El argentino despertar de las faunas y de las gentes prehistóricas. Coleccionistas, Museos y estudiosos en la Argentina entre 1880 y 1910, 1999. Argentine Society of Anthropology
- El Argentino despertar de las faunas y de las gentes prehistóricas. Coleccionistas, estudiosos, museos y universidad en la creación del patrimonio paleontológico y arqueológico nacional (1875-1913), 2000. University of Buenos Aires Press
- Charlatanes: Crónicas de Remedios Incurables [Charlatans: Chronicles of Incurable Remedies] (in Spanish). Buenos Aires: Eterna Cadencia. 2012. ISBN 978-987-1673-67-4.
- Kelly, Tatiana; Podgorny, Irina, eds. (2012). Los Secretos de Barba azul: Fantasías y realidades de los archivos del Museo de La Plata (in Spanish). Rosario: Prohistoria. ISBN 978-987-1855-14-8.
- Achim, Miruna; Podgorny, Irina, eds. (2013). Museos al detalle: colecciones, antigüedades e historia natural. Rosario: Prohistoria. ISBN 978-987-1855-68-1.
- Kohl, Philip L. (2014). Podgorny, Irina; Gänger, Stephanie (eds.). Nature and Antiquities:The Making of Archaeology in the Americas. University of Arizona Press. ISBN 978-0-8165-3112-7.

=== Articles ===
- "Changing the Dead to Statues of Stone. Synthesis of Fossils, Petrifaction, Photography, and the Chemistry of the Gorgonean Arts". Nuncius: Journal of the History of Science. 2012. ISSN 0394-7394 – via Nuncius, Volume 27/2, pp. 289-308.
- "El desierto en una vitrina: museos e historia natural". Revista Brasileira de História (in Spanish). Limusa. 2008. eISSN 1806-9347. ISSN 0102-0188.
- "El sendero del tiempo y de las causas accidentales: Los espacios de la Prehistoria en la Argentina, 1850-1910" (in Spanish). Rosario: Prohistoria. 2009. eISSN 1852-0499.
- García, Susana; Podgorny (2010). "Causas simultáneas actuando en largos períodos de tiempo" [Simultaneous causes acting in long periods of time] (PDF). Periódico de arte, cultura y desarrollo del CCPE/ AECID (in Spanish). Rosario: Parque de España Cultural Center. Archived from the original (PDF) on 4 March 2016.
- "Neomylodon". Eine Naturgeschichte für das 21. Jahrhundert: Hommage à, zu Ehren von, in honor of Hans-Jörg Rheinberger. Berlin: Max Planck Institute for the History of Science: 94–96. 2011 – via S. Azzouni et.al. (eds.).
- Podgorny, Irina (31 August 2012). "Fossil Dealers, the Practices of Comparative Anatomy, and British Diplomacy in Latin America, 1820-1840". British Journal for the History of Science. 46 (4): 647–674. doi:10.1017/S0007087412000702.
