= María Fernanda Beigel =

Argentine sociologist

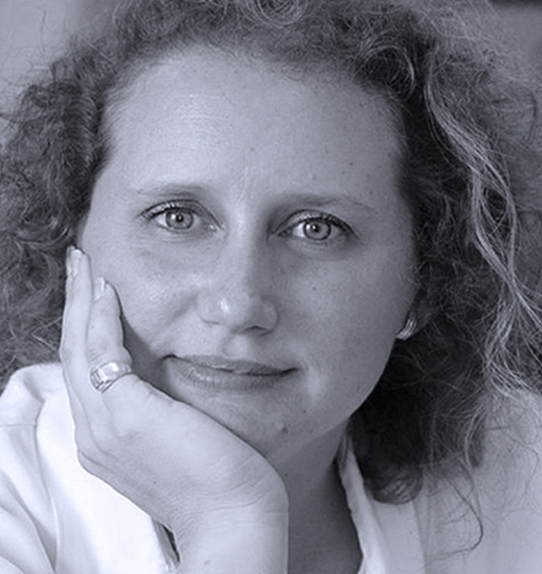
- Born: 6 September 1970 (age 55)
- Occupation: Sociologist
- Awards: Bernardo Houssay Award

María Fernanda Beigel (born 6 September 1970, Mendoza) is an Argentine sociologist and scientist who develops her research at the crossroads between Bourdieu's reflexivity and the Latin American historical-structural tradition.

She works as a researcher and project manager at the Institute of Human, Social and Environmental Sciences (INCIHUSA) of the National Council for Scientific and Technical Research (CONICET) and as Professor at the Faculty of Political and Social Sciences of the National University of Cuyo (UNCu).

Specialized in sociology of science, she works on the international circulation of knowledge produced in the periphery through prosopographic studies, descriptive statistics, and multiple correspondence analysis. Beigel received the “Bernardo Houssay” Award in the Young Researcher category in 2003 and the Honorable Mention for Scientific Value granted by the Argentine Senate in 2017. In 2004 Beigel won an essay contest organized by the Latin American Council of Social Sciences (CLACSO).

== Academic and professional career ==
Beigel studied sociology at the National University of Cuyo (UNCu) and obtained a bachelor's degree in that specialty in 1993.

Later she specialized in Economic History and Economic Policies at the Faculty of Economic Sciences of the University of Buenos Aires (UBA).

In 2001 Beigel obtained her Doctorate in Political and Social Sciences at UNCu. In 2008 she entered the CONICET Scientific and Technological Researcher Career in the category of Adjunct Researcher. In 2012 she was promoted to the category of Independent Researcher and in 2017 she reached the category of Principal Investigator. Beigel has been a professor of Latin American Sociology at the Faculty of Political and Social Sciences of the UNCu since 2010.

Since 2018, Beigel coordinates the AmeliCA Research Commission (Open Knowledge for Latin America and the Global South), an initiative launched by various institutions, which seeks a collaborative, sustainable, protected and non-commercial Open Access solution for Latin America and the Global South.

== Publications ==
Beigel has published numerous works on the structural heterogeneity of the Argentine scientific-university field, the segmented publication circuits and the evaluative cultures faced in peripheral academic centers:

- Institutional Expansion and Scientific Development in the Periphery: The Structural Heterogeneity of Argentina's Academic Field; Minerva; 1–2018; 1-27. En colaboración con Osvaldo Gallardo y Fabiana Bekerman.
- Sobre las astucias de los tabús intelectuales: Bourdieu y la dependencia académica; PRÁCTICAS DE OFICIO, v.2, n. 20, dic. 2017-jun. 2018.
- Científicos Periféricos, entre Ariel y Calibán. Saberes Institucionales y Circuitos de Consagración en Argentina: Las Publicaciones de los Investigadores del CONICET; Universidade do Estado do Rio de Janeiro. Instituto de Estudos Sociais e Políticos; Dados; 59; 3; 9–2017; 215–255.
- Culturas [evaluativas] alteradas; Federación Nacional de Docentes; Política Universitaria; 2; 8–2015; 12–21.
- Circuitos segmentados de consagración académica: las revistas de ciencias sociales y humanas en Argentina; Universidad de Buenos Aires. Facultad de Filosofía y Letras, Instituto de Investigaciones Bibliotecológicas; Información, cultura y sociedad; 32; 7–2015; 7-32. En colaboración con Javier Maximiliano Salatino.
- Publishing from the periphery: Structural heterogeneity and segmented circuits. The evaluation of scientific publications for tenure in Argentina's CONICET; Sage Publications; Current Sociology; 62; 5; 6–2014; 1-32.
- Centros y periferias en la circulación internacional del conocimiento; Fundación Foro Nueva Sociedad; Nueva Sociedad; 245; 5–2013; 110–123.
