= Muchnik =

Muchnik or Muchnick is a surname, and may refer to:

- Albert Muchnik, Russian mathematician and logician
- Alexander Muchnik, Ukrainian lawyer, human rights activist and journalist
- Avi Muchnick, artist, author, programmer and entrepreneur
- Irvin Muchnick, American writer and first-named respondent in the Supreme Court case Reed Elsevier, Inc. v. Muchnick
- Isadore H. Y. Muchnick (1908–1963), Boston City Councilman and School Committee member
- Laurie Muchnick, fiction editor at Kirkus Reviews
- Michoel Muchnik, American artist
- Rosa Muchnik, Argentine chemist
- Sam Muchnick (1905–1998), American wrestling promoter
- Steven Muchnick, computer scientist

Related surnames

- Muchnic
