= Rodolfo Brenner =

Argentine biochemist

- Rodolfo Roberto Brenner
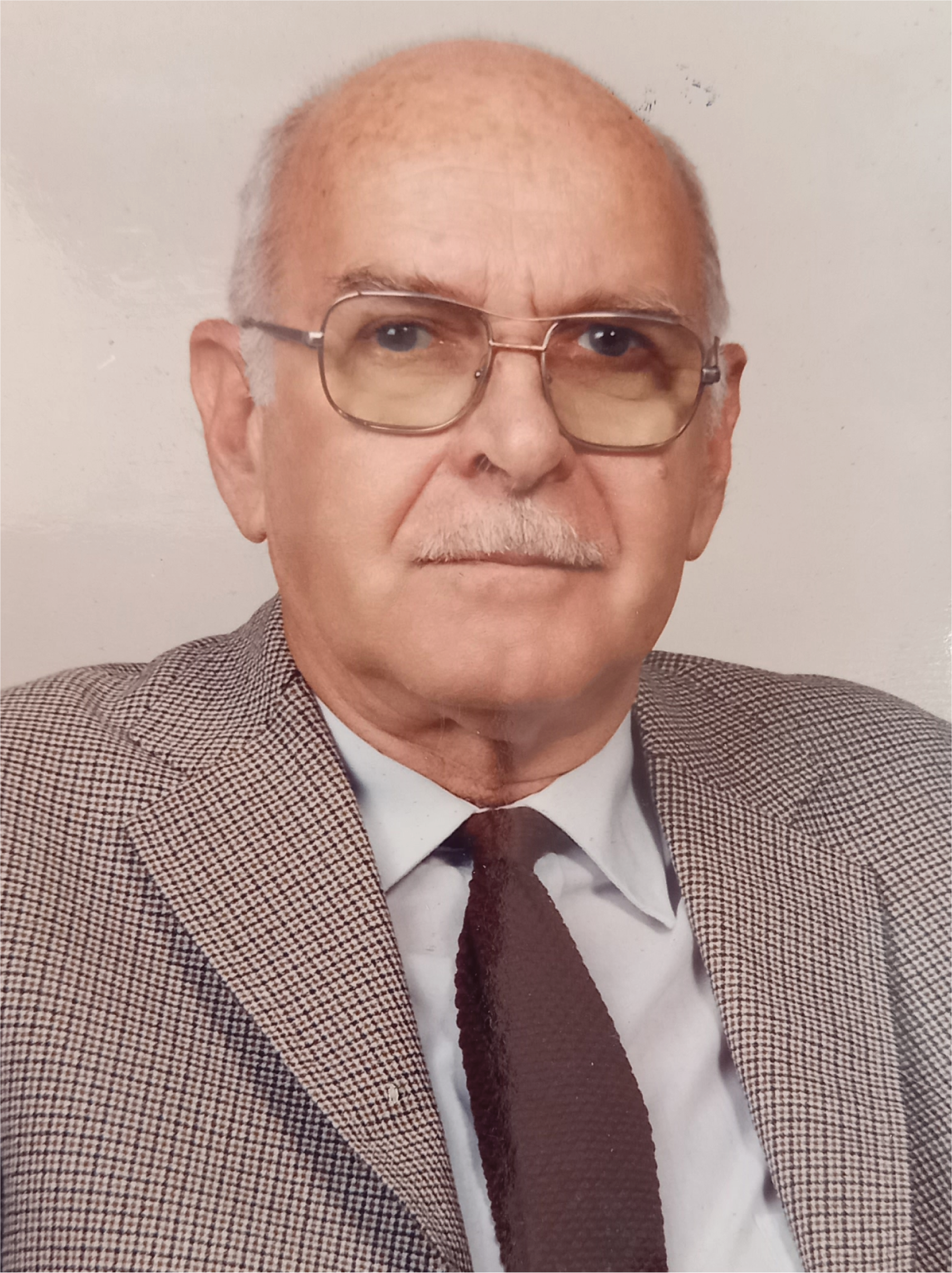
- Born: 17 July 1922; Banfield Buenos Aires province
- Died: 7 March 2018 (aged 95)
- Citizenship: Argentina
- Education: University of Buenos Aires
- Awards: TWAS 2001, Konex Award, 1983 John Joseph Jolly Kyle award, 1990 Bernardo Houssay Award
- Scientific career
- Workplaces: University of Buenos Aires; National University of La Plata
- Thesis: Composición química de aceites de oliva argentinos (1946)
- Doctoral advisor: Pedro Cattaneo

Rodolfo Roberto Brenner was an Argentine emeritus professor of chemistry. He was the founder and director of the Institute of Biochemical Research of La Plata and the co-founder of the Argentine Society for Biochemical Research.

== Life and education ==
Rodolfo Brenner was born on July 17, 1922, at Banfield, Buenos Aires Province of Argentina. In 1940 and 1946 he graduated as the best B. Sc and PhD chemistry student at the Colegio Nacional de Buenos Aires and the University of Buenos Aires winning gold medals for his performances

== Career ==
Rodolfo Brenner started as a graduate assistance till he became a professor. He worked as a Chairman of Bromatology and Industrial Analysis of the Faculty of Exact, Physical and Natural Sciences of the University of Buenos Aires between 1946 and 1954. Consequently, he was the one in charge of Industrial Toxicology Section at the Institute of Medical-Technological Research and the Institute of Public Hygiene where he studied the lipid composition of different river fish and he supervised five doctoral students.

In his last year as the chair of Bromatology and Industrial Analysis, he was awarded a British Council Postdoctoral Fellowship to work on "lipid chemistry and biochemistry" with Professor John Arnold Lovern at the Torry Research Institute in Aberdeen in Scotland. He returned in 1956 and became a full professor at the Faculty of Medical Sciences of the National University of La Plata. He became emeritus professor in 1998, the director of National Council for Scientific and Technical Research and institute of Physiology in 1968 and 1971 respectively.

== Awards and honours ==
Rodolfo Brenner received Skibb 1950 gold medal, the Campomar Foundation Award in 1972, G. Burns and Von Euler gold medal in 1985, Konex Award in 1983; Alfredo Sordelli prize in 1985 and JJ Kyle award in 1990 . He also received the “Supelco AOCS Research Award” from the American Oil Chemists' Society, in Baltimore, US, in 1990 In 2001, he won the TWAS Basic Medical Sciences award for leading a research on the resolution of the mechanism of polyunsaturated fatty acid biosynthesis in animals and their regulation by dietary components and hormones and their biochemical and physiological effects. In 2006, he won the Bernardo Houssay Award.

== Selected publications ==
- International Symposium on Function and Biosynthesis of Lipids, S. d. l. V., Bazán, N. G., Brenner, R. R. 1., & Giusto, N. M. (1977). Function and biosynthesis of lipids: [proceedings of the International Symposium on Function and Biosynthesis of Lipids held at Sierra de la Ventana, Tornquist, Province of Buenos Aires, Argentina, November, 1976]. New York: Plenum Press.
- Rodolfo R. Brenner, Nutritional and hormonal factors influencing desatur tion of essential fatty acids, Progress in Lipid Research, Volume 20, 1981, Pages 41–47, ISSN 0163-7827,
- Rodolfo R. Brenner, Effect of unsaturated acids on membrane structure and enzyme kinetics, Progress in Lipid Research, Volume 23, Issue 2, 1984, Pages 69–96, ISSN 0163-7827,
- Brenner, R.R. The oxidative desaturation of unsaturated fatty acids in animals. Mol Cell Biochem 3, 41–52 (1974).
- Brenner, R.R. (1977). Regulatory Function of Δ6 Desaturase — Key Enzyme of Polyunsaturated Fatty Acid Synthesis. In: Bazán, N.G., Brenner, R.R., Giusto, N.M. (eds) Function and Biosynthesis of Lipids. Advances in Experimental Medicine and Biology, vol 83. Springer, Boston, MA.
