= Adriana Cristina Serquis =

Argentine physicist (born 1967)

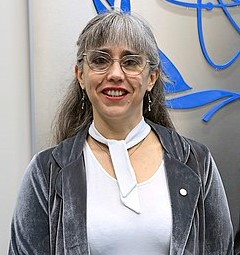
- At IAEA headquarters in Vienna in 2022

National Deputy
- Incumbent
- Assumed office 10 December 2025
- Constituency: Río Negro

President of the National Atomic Energy Commission
- In office 4 June 2021 – 6 May 2024
- President: Alberto Fernández
- Preceded by: Osvaldo Calzetta
- Succeeded by: Germán Guido Lavalle

Personal details
- Born: 7 November 1967 (age 58) Buenos Aires, Argentina
- Party: Fuerza Patria
- Education: University of Buenos Aires; Balseiro Institute
- Occupation: Physicist
- Awards: Bernardo Houssay Award (2006); Konex Award (2013); L'Oréal-UNESCO (2014)

Adriana Cristina Serquis (born 7 November 1967) is an Argentine physicist and researcher associated to the National Scientific and Technical Research Council (CONICET). From 2021 to 2024 she was president of the National Atomic Energy Commission (CNEA). In 2014, she received the L'Oréal-UNESCO National Award For Women in Science for her contribution to the rational use of electrical energy.

In 2025 she was elected to the National Chamber of Deputies to represent Río Negro on the Fuerza Patria list.

== Biography ==
Adriana Cristina Serquis was born in Buenos Aires on 7 November 1967. She took an interest in physics at an early age.

My grandfather had not finished primary school, but he was a born researcher. He built a crystal radio, and was the one who fixed all the damaged appliances in the neighborhood where he lived, and where we visited him every summer, in Córdoba. My father was an industrial engineer. When I discovered physics, in the first year of the Sagrado Corazón, in Villa Celina, I knew immediately that that was what I wanted to study.

She earned a licentiate in physical sciences at the Faculty of Exact and Natural Sciences of the University of Buenos Aires in 1993, and a doctorate in physical sciences at the Balseiro Institute in 2000.

From 1994 to 2000, she was a fellow of the CNEA and CONICET. From 2001 to 2003, she was a post-doctoral researcher at Los Alamos National Laboratory in the United States.

As CONICET's principal researcher at the CNEA's Bariloche Atomic Center, her line of research was framed in developing advanced techniques for characterizing materials for clean energies, where she studied the synthesis and characterization of superconducting materials and nanometric oxides for high temperature fuel cells.

She also served as an adjunct professor at the Andean Headquarters of the National University of Río Negro, dictating materials for the chemistry program, and as a visiting professor at the Balseiro Institute.

She is president of the Argentine Crystallography Association and a member of the administrative council of the Argentine Nanotechnology Foundation.

She was named president of the CNEA on 4 June 2021.

== Awards ==
- 2006: Bernardo Houssay Young Researcher Award
- 2013: Merit Diploma in Nanotechnology from the Konex Foundation
- 2014: L'Oréal-UNESCO National Award For Women in Science

== Selected publications ==
- "Effect of lattice strain and defects on the superconductivity of MgB2", A Serquis, YT Zhu, EJ Peterson, JY Coulter, DE Peterson, FM Mueller, Applied Physics Letters 79 (2001), 4399–4401.
- "Strongly enhanced current densities in superconducting coated conductors of YBa2Cu3O7–δ+ BaZrO3", JL MacManus-Driscoll, SR Foltyn, QX Jia, H Wang, A Serquis, L Civale, Nature Materials 3 (2004), 439–443.
- "High performance nanostructured IT-SOFC cathodes prepared by novel chemical method", L. Baqué, A. Caneiro, M. S. Moreno, A. Serquis, Electroch. Comm. 10 (2008) 1905.
- "Vertically aligned nanocomposite thin films as a cathode-electrolyte interface layer for thin film solid oxide fuel cells", S.M. Cho, J.S. Yoon, J.H. Kim, Z.X. Bi, A. Serquis, X.H. Zhang, A. Manthiram, and H.Y. Wang, Advanced Functional Materials 19 (2009) 3868–3873.
- "Synthesis and structural characterization of Co-doped lanthanum strontium titanates", F. Napolitano, D. G. Lamas, A. Soldati, A. Serquis, IJHE 37 (2012) 18302–18309.
