= Parque Tecnológico del Litoral Centro =

Coordinates: 31.6395°S 60.6669°W

Parque Tecnologico del Litoral Centro SAPEM (PTLC Technological Park of the Litoral Centro), is both an institution and a complex of buildings located near Santa Fe, Argentina, created by the National Scientific and Technical Research Council (CONICET) for the geographical concentration of scientific research and development projects of the area.

The institution promotes the realization of scientific projects through financial support and providing areas to conduct these projects, as well as facilitating the integration of technology transfer to production companies.

There is also an "Enterprise Incubator" where new firms can develop their business basis to prepare until they can function properly.
