= Diego Pol =

Argentinian paleontologist (born 1974)

- Born: June 23, 1974 (age 51); Rosario, Santa Fe, Argentina
- Occupation: Paleontologist
- Known for: Dinosaur paleontology in Patagonia
- Awards: Bernardo Houssay Award

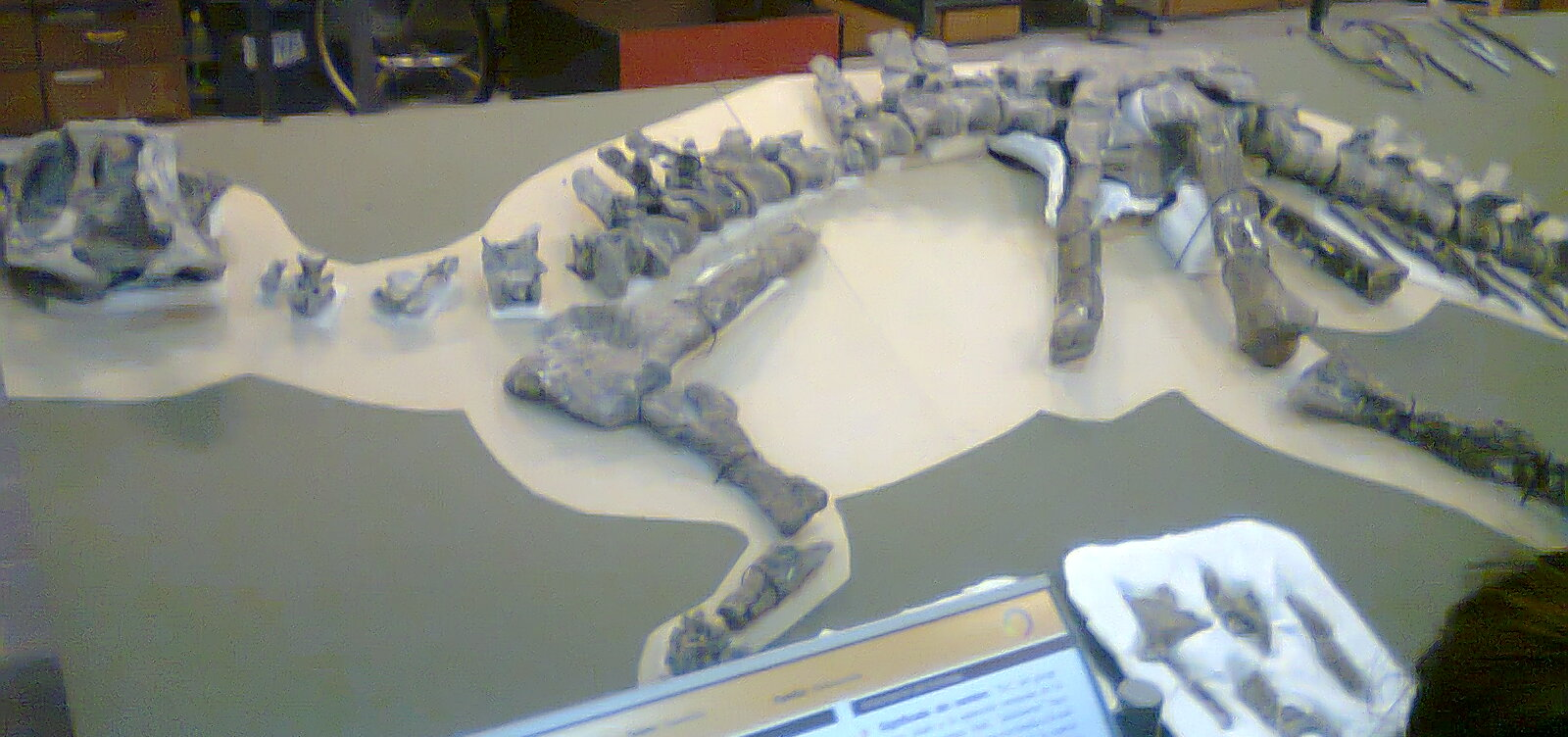
Fossils of Eoabelisaurus, Egidio Feruglio Museum

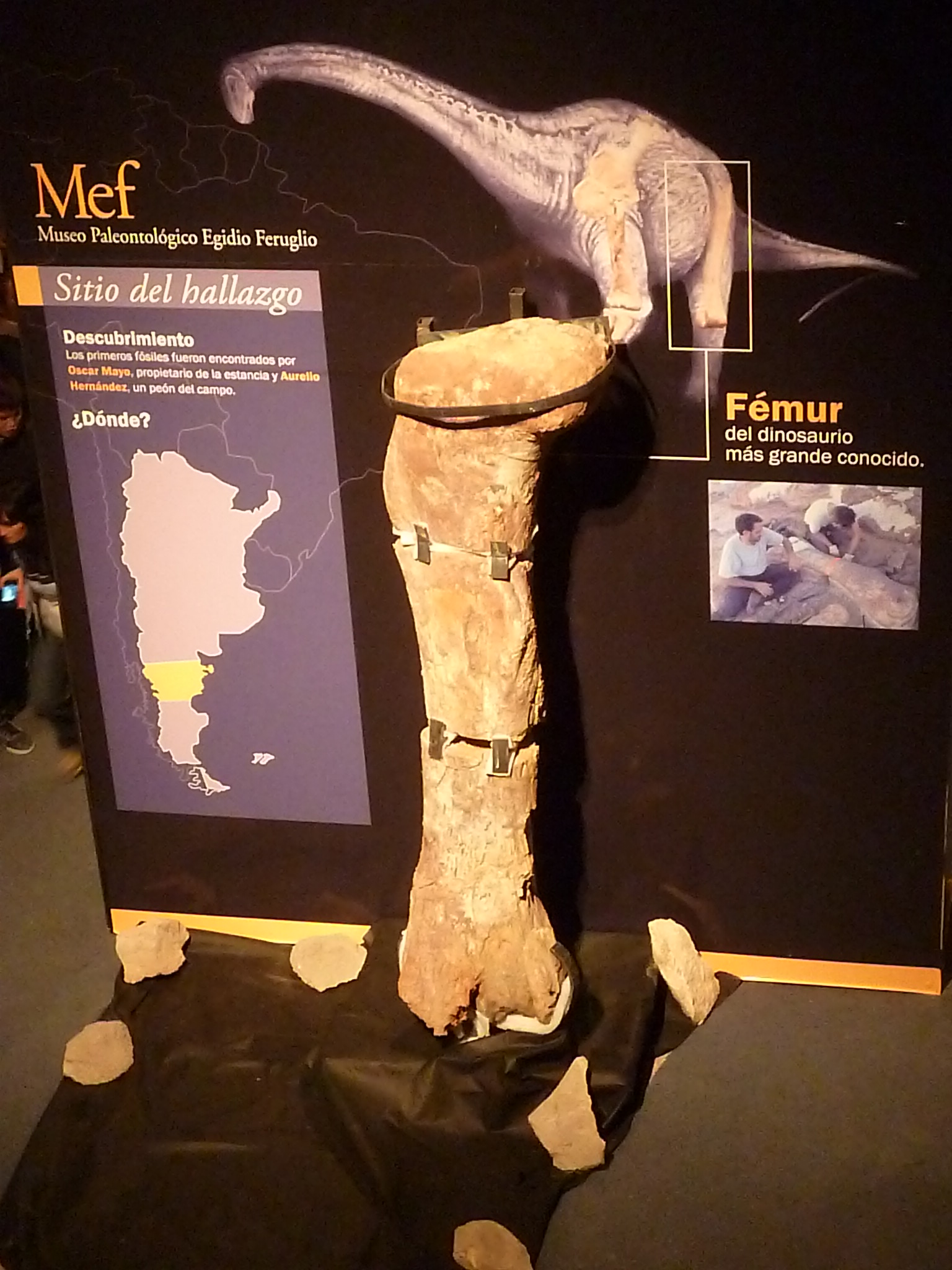
Fossil of a titanosaur from Chubut, Egidio Feruglio Museum

Diego Pol (born 23 June 1974, Rosario) is an Argentine paleontologist, specialized in Mesozoic era dinosaurs of Patagonia. He is a principal researcher of CONICET at the Museum of Paleontology Egidio Feruglio in Trelew. He is notable for his contributions to the discovery and naming of several dinosaur species, such as Lorosuchus, Manidens, Glacialisaurus, Eoabelisaurus, and others.

== Biography ==
Diego Pol was born on 23 June 1974 in Rosario, Argentina, but moved to Buenos Aires in his childhood. He studied at the Colegio Nacional de Buenos Aires and in 1999 graduated with a degree in Biological Sciences from the Faculty of Exact and Natural Sciences at the University of Buenos Aires.

In 1999, he moved to New York City, United States, where he obtained a master's degree and a PhD in a joint program of the American Museum of Natural History and Columbia University. His PhD thesis focused on the evolution of basal dinosaurs and Mesozoic crocodyliforms, under the supervision of Dr. M. A. Norell.

In 2005 he completed postdoctoral studies at the Mathematical Biosciences Institute of Ohio State University. There, under the direction of Dr. D. Janies (OSU) and Pablo Goloboff (CONICET), he worked on heuristic methods for searching phylogenetic trees.

In 2006 he returned to Argentina to work at the Egidio Feruglio Paleontological Museum, conducting fieldwork and studying fossils discovered there. His research focuses on phylogenetic relationships and the evolution of Mesozoic archosaurs.

Together with José Luis Carballido, he was part of the team that discovered what turned out to be the largest titanosaur in the world in Chubut Province in 2011, presented to the public in May 2014. This dinosaur, Patagotitan mayorum, was featured in the 2016 documentary Attenborough and the Giant Dinosaur, where Pol appeared alongside David Attenborough and Ben Garrod.

That same year, he was one of the four winners of the 2013 Bernardo Houssay Award presented by the Argentine Ministry of Science, Technology and Innovation, given to researchers under 45.

In 2023 he received the Konex Foundation Platinum Konex Award for his work in Paleontology over the last decade.

He is also deputy editor of Ameghiniana, the bimonthly publication of the Argentine Paleontological Association.

== Selected publications ==
A selection of Diego Pol's most cited publications:

- Turner, A. H., Pol, D., Clarke, J. A., Erickson, G. M., & Norell, M. A. (2007). A basal dromaeosaurid and size evolution preceding avian flight. Science, 317(5843), 1378–1381.
- Buckley, G. A., Brochu, C. A., Krause, D. W., & Pol, D. (2000). A pug-nosed crocodyliform from the Late Cretaceous of Madagascar. Nature, 405(6789), 941.
- Pol, D. (2003). New remains of Sphagesaurus huenei (Crocodylomorpha: Mesoeucrocodylia) from the Late Cretaceous of Brazil. Journal of Vertebrate Paleontology, 23(4), 817–831.
