= Gottifredi =

Gottifredi is a surname of Italian origin. It may refer to the following notable people:

- Aloysius Gottifredi (1595–1652), Italian Jesuit leader
- Mariano Gottifredi (1930–2020), Italian Olympic rower
- Vanesa Gottifredi (born 1969), Argentine chemist and biologist
