= Noemí Zaritzky =

Argentine chemistry professor and researcher

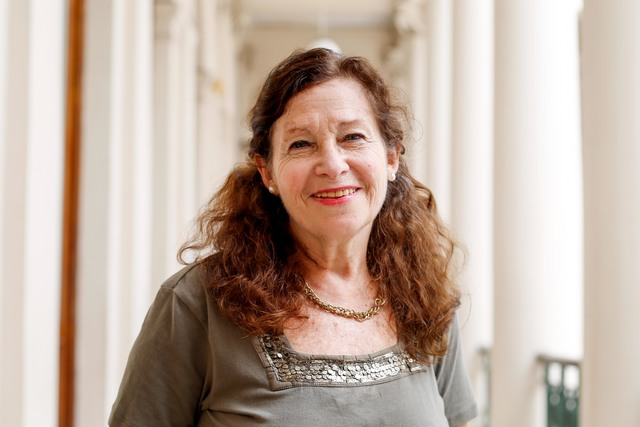
- Zaritzky in 2018
- Born: Noemí Elisabet Zaritzky; 7 February 1951 (age 75); La Plata, Argentina

Academic background
- Education: Universidad Nacional de La Plata
- Alma mater: University of Buenos Aires

Academic work
- Discipline: Chemistry
- Sub-discipline: Cryopreservation of food
- Institutions: Universidad Nacional de La Plata; CIDCA

Noemí Elisabet Zaritzky (born 7 February 1951) is an Argentine chemistry professor and researcher.

She holds a degree in chemical engineering by the Engineering Faculty of the Universidad Nacional de La Plata (1971). In addition, she has a PhD in chemistry from the University of Buenos Aires and is senior lecturer at the Engineering Faculty of the Universidad Nacional de La Plata and the director of the CIDCA.

== Biography ==
Since Zaritzky was a child, she showed her interest for science. She graduated as a teacher at the age of 16, and subsequently passed baccalaureate subjects in order to go to a public university. When she was 20 years old, she had already graduated as a chemical engineer, and married one of her faculty partners. They have three children and four grandchildren. Her teaching and research work has resulted in several inventions, which are patented.

== Professional career ==
She started as a researcher in the Food Cryotechnology Research and Development Centre (CIDCA), and was the director of this centre from 2003 to mid-2016. She published 250 articles in international journals and over 40 book chapters. Furthermore, she works as a professor at the NULP, where she was in charge of human resource management.

Noemí Zaritzky is also a senior researcher of the board in the Food Cryotechnology Research and Development Centre (CIDCA), an organisation created by an agreement on 10 February 1973 between the NULP and the National Scientific and Technical Research Council (CONICET).

In order to reduce the pollution caused by the food industry, Zaritzky developed techniques that apply natural coagulants to treat effluents, and created technologies that take advantage of the collaborative work of bacteria. Microorganisms build up "consortia" that consume pollutants and purify water. Thus, the use of these technologies in the food industry will reduce the pollution that it causes in the waters of rivers, streams and lagoons. In addition, Zaritzky found a solution to the problem of waste generated by the processing of prawns, crabs, shrimp and crabs in Patagonia. Chitosan is obtained from these crustaceans, which is used to synthesize micro and nanoparticles, which are capable of decontaminating waters with chromium, a carcinogen.

In recognition of her research, especially in the cryopreservation of food and biological material, the application of these findings to the productive sector and the training of other researchers, Zaritzky was awarded in 2015 the Bunge y Born Prize of Process Engineering by a jury chaired by Roberto Williams and Miguel Laborde.

Dr. Zaritzky also received the Houssay Trajectory Award in the areas of engineering, architecture and information technology on 20 December 2016. In 2023 she was granted the Platinum Konex Award for her work in Agricultural and Food Sciences in the last decade.

== Works ==
- María A. García, Miriam N. Martino, and Noemí E. Zaritzky. Plasticized Starch-Based Coatings To Improve Strawberry (Fragaria × Ananassa) Quality and Stability. The Food Cryotechnology Research and Development Centre (CIDCA), CONICET, Facultad de Ciencias Exactas, and Departamento de Ingeniería Química, Facultad de Ingeniería, Universidad Nacional de La Plata, 47 y 116, La Plata (1900), Buenos Aires, Argentina
- Olivia V. López, María A. García, Noemí E. Zaritzky. Film forming capacity of chemically modified corn starches. CIDCA, Facultad de Ciencias Exactas, UNLP-CONICET, 47 y 116, 1900 La Plata, Buenos Aires, Argentina. Facultad de Ingeniería, UNLP, Argentina
- Claudia A. Romero-Bastida, Luis A. Bello-Pérez, María A. García, Miriam N. Martino, Javier Solorza-Feria, Noemí E. Zaritzky. Physicochemical and microstructural characterization of films prepared by thermal and cold gelatinization from non-conventional sources of starches. Centro de Desarrollo de Productos Bióticos del IPN, Km 8.5 carr. Yautepec-Jojutla, 62731 Yautepec, Morelos, México. Centro de Investigación y Desarrollo en Criotecnología de Alimentos (CIDCA), CONICET, Fac. Cs Exactas, Universidad Nacional de la Plata, La Plata, Argentina
- Alejandro H. Caravellia, Edgardo M. Contrerasa, Noemí E. Zaritzky. Phosphorous removal in batch systems using ferric chloride in the presence of activated sludges. the Food Cryotechnology Research and Development Centre (CIDCA), CONICET La Plata, UNLP. 47 y 116 (B1900AJJ), La Plata, Argentina Fac. de Ingeniería, UNLP. 47 y 1 (B1900AJJ), La Plata, Argentina, December 2009.
- Olivia V. Lópeza, Noemí E. Zaritzky, María A. García. Physicochemical characterization of chemically modified corn starches related to rheological behavior, retrogradation and film forming capacity. CIDCA (Centro de Investigación y Desarrollo en Criotecnología de Alimentos), Facultad de Ciencias Exactas UNLP – Centro Científico Tecnológico La Plata (CCT-La Plata) CONICET, 47 y 116 S/N°, La Plata (B1900AJJ), Buenos Aires, Argentina. Facultad de Ingeniería, Universidad Nacional de La Plata (UNLP), Argentina 20109
- Valerio Bifania, Cristian Ramíreza, Mónica Ihla, Mónica Rubilara, Alejandra García, Noemí Zaritzky. Effects of murta (Ugni molinae Turcz) extract on gas and water vapor permeability of carboxymethylcellulose-based edible films. Departamento de Ingeniería Química, Universidad de La Frontera, P.O. Box 54-D, Temuco, Chile, the Food Cryotechnology Research and Development Centre (CIDCA), CONICET, Universidad Nacional de La Plata, Buenos Aires 1900, Argentina, 2007.
- Sonia Z. Viña, Alicia Mugridge, María A. García, Ricardo M. Ferreyra, Miriam N. Martino, Alicia R. Chavesa, Noemí E. Zaritzky, Effects of polyvinylchloride films and edible starch coatings on quality aspects of refrigerated Brussels sprouts. the Food Cryotechnology Research and Development Centre (CIDCA), CONICET – Facultad de Ciencias Exactas, Universidad Nacional de La Plata (UNLP), Calle 47 y 116 S/N°, La Plata B1900AJJ, Buenos Aires, Argentina, Departamento de Ingeniería Química, Facultad de Ingeniería UNLP, Argentina, 2006.

== Awards and recognition ==
- Konex Award - Merit Diploma, 2023
- Premio Fundación Bunge y Born, 52nd edition, 2015
- Houssay Career Award and Researcher of the Nation, 2015
