= Alberto Cassano =

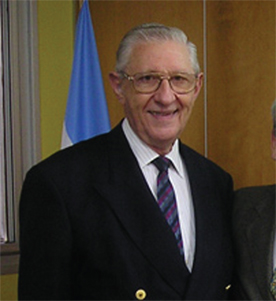
Alberto Cassano

Alberto Cassano (23 January 1935 – 12 July 2014) was an Argentine engineer and academic. He was a professor at the Universidad Nacional del Litoral during most of his career. He founded the program CONICET. He founded the Instituto de Desarrollo Tecnológico para la Industria Química (INTEC) and the Centro Regional de Investigación y Desarrollo (CERIDE).

In 2006, he received the Houssay Career Award for outstanding research work.

Cassano died in Santa Fe Province following a long illness, aged 79.
