= Ana Lía Kornblit =

Argentine sociologist

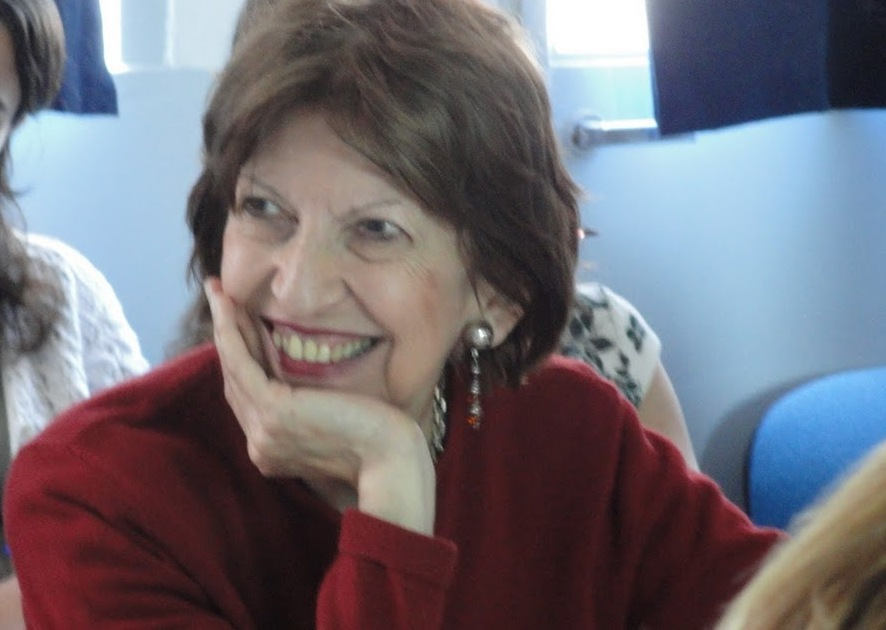
- Born: 17 June 1941; Buenos Aires, Argentina
- Died: 17 February 2025 (aged 83)
- Occupation: Sociology
- Awards: Guggenheim Fellow (2003); Konex Award (2006 and 2016)

Academic background
- Education: University of Buenos Aires

Academic work
- Discipline: Sociology
- Sub-discipline: Medical sociology
- Institutions: University of Buenos Aires; Qualitas Foundation

Ana Lía Kornblit (17 June 1941 – 17 February 2025) was an Argentine sociologist. Working within medical sociology, she wrote several books and was a professor of social psychology at the University of Buenos Aires. She was a 2003 Guggenheim Fellow and won the Konex Award in Psychology twice (2006 and 2016).

== Biography ==
Kornblit was born on 17 June 1941 in Buenos Aires. She was educated at the University of Buenos Aires, where she obtained two licentiates: one in sociology in 1962, and another in psychology in 1965. More than three decades later, she obtained her PhD in anthropology from UBA in 1998.

In 1985, Kornblit became a professor of social psychology at UBA. The same year, she became a principal investigator at the National Scientific and Technical Research Council. In addition to her professor work at UBA, she was director of their Instituto de Investigaciones Gino Germani, where she was coordinator in health and population, as well as coordinator of the social sciences master program. She also worked for the Qualitas Foundation as a health qualitative methodology teacher.

Kornblit specialized in the sociology of health. She also wrote several books, including Juventud y vida cotidiana, Metodologías cualitativas en ciencias sociales, Nuevos estudios sobre drogadicción, and Violencia escolar y climas sociales, while she co-authored Abordajes comunitarios de los consumos de drogas, Brindemos con salud, Gays y lesbianas, formación de la identidad y derechos sexuales, La sexualidad va a la escuela, and Salud y adolescencia. She also worked with UNICEF on some of their studies, particularly on youth suicide and child sexual abuse.

In 2003, Kornblit was awarded a Guggenheim Fellowship "for a study of attitudes, beliefs, and risky sexual behaviors of Buenos Aires youths". She won the Konex Award in Psychology twice, in 2006 and 2016. She won a 2006 Houssay Career Award.

Kornblit died on 17 February 2025.
