= Vanesa Gottifredi =

Argentine chemist and biologist

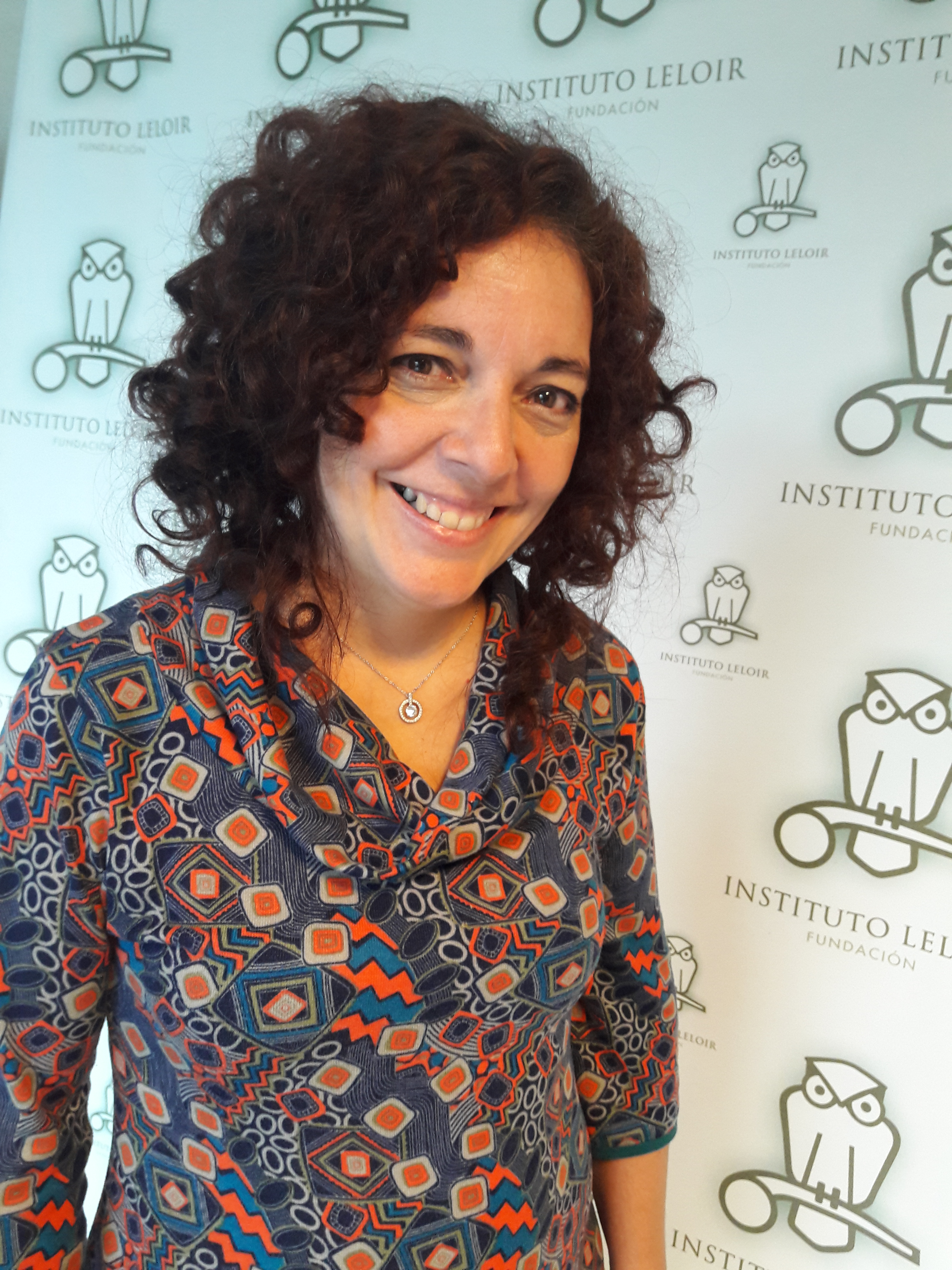
- Born: 13 November 1969 (age 57); Salta Province, Argentina
- Education: National University of Salta; Sapienza University of Rome
- Awards: Bernardo Houssay Award (2014); L'Oréal-UNESCO Award (2019)

Vanesa Gottifredi (born 13 November 1969) is an Argentine chemist and biologist. She works as a researcher in the Principal Investigator category of the Scientific and Technological Researcher Program (CICT) of the National Scientific and Technical Research Council (CONICET). She is also head of the Leloir Institute's Cell Cycle and Genomic Stability Laboratory. She specializes in the mechanisms of tumor cell response to chemotherapy, work for which she was awarded by the Alexander von Humboldt Foundation and L'Oreal-UNESCO.

== Career ==
Vanesa Gottifredi completed her undergraduate studies at the National University of Salta, where she obtained a licentiate in chemistry in 1992. She then studied at the Sapienza University of Rome, where she graduated as a doctor in human biology in 1998. Later she conducted postdoctoral studies in cell biology and cancer at Columbia University in the United States.

As head of the Cell Cycle and Genomic Stability Laboratory at the Leloir Institute Foundation, she conducts research on defense mechanisms that both normal and tumor cells use to cope with adverse events, and how malignant cells avoid the effects of chemotherapy.

== Awards ==
- Special mention for the Lóreál-UNESCO Award, 2013
- Bernardo Houssay Award for Medical Science, 2014
- Friedrich Wilhelm Bessel Award from the Alexander von Humboldt Foundation, 2017
- Ben Barres Spotlight Award from eLife, 2019
- L'Oréal-UNESCO For Women in Science Award (Argentine national edition), in collaboration with CONICET, 2019
