= Muchnic =

Muchnic is a surname. Notable people with the surname include:

- Helen Muchnic, American academic
- Suzanne Muchnic (born 1940), American art writer

== See also ==
- Muchnik
