= Juan Pablo Paz =

Argentine physicist (born 1959)

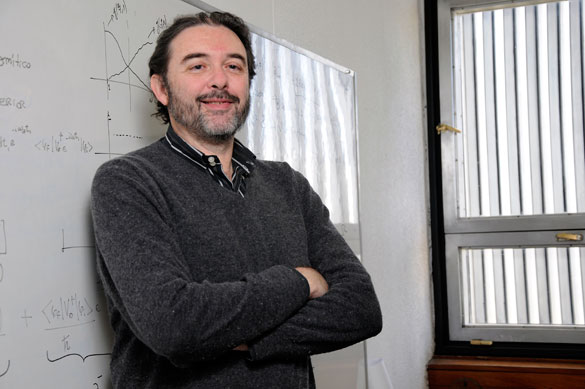
Paz in 2012

Juan Pablo Paz (born 1959) is an Argentinian physicist who works in the field of quantum computing. A research scientist currently working at the University of Buenos Aires, he has also worked at the Los Alamos National Laboratory in the United States.

== Early life and education ==
Juan Pablo Paz was born in Buenos Aires in 1959. He studied at the University of Buenos Aires, where he got his Master (1984) and Ph.D. (1988) degrees. He then went for postdoctoral stays to the University of Maryland (1989-1991) and the Los Alamos National Laboratory (1991-1994).

== Career ==
In 1994, Paz became associate professor in the Physics Department of the University of Buenos Aires and in 1999 associate professor. From 2003 to 2004 he was member of the technical staff at Los Alamos.Currently, Paz is a full professor in the Physics Department of the University of Buenos Aires, where he leads the Quantum Foundations and Information group.Between 1984 and 2004 he was married to Silvina Ponce Dawson (who is also a physicist) with whom he had two children.

From 2019 to 2023, he was vice secretary of science (secretario de Articulación Científico Tecnológica, Secretary of Scientific and Technological Coordination) in the government of Alberto Fernández.

Currently, Paz is a full professor in the Physics Department of the University of Buenos Aires, where he leads the Quantum Foundations and Information group.

=== Research ===
Paz has worked on the quantum theory of quantum error correction, and has developed a number of techniques to correct errors in quantum computers. He has also studied how to use quantum computers to simulate chaotic systems, in the context of chaos theory.

In 2002, alongside César Miguel and Marcos Saraceno, he developed a program that allows efficient spectroscopy and tomography using a quantum computer, establishing for the first time an analogy between these tasks.

== Personal life ==
Between 1984 and 2004 he was married to Silvina Ponce Dawson (who is also a physicist) with whom he had two children.

== Awards ==
- Ernesto E. Galloni Award in Physics, 1994
- International Fellow, Santa Fe Institute, 2001-2003
- Guggenheim Fellow, 2004
- W. Bessel Award, 2006. Alexander von Humboldt Foundation
- Bunge & Born Foundation, 2010
- TWAS Prize in Physics, 2012
- Bernardo Houssay Award and Researcher of the Nation, 2014
- Fellow of the World Academy of Sciences, 2021
