= Conrado Varotto =

Argentine physicist (born 1941)

Conrado Franco Varotto
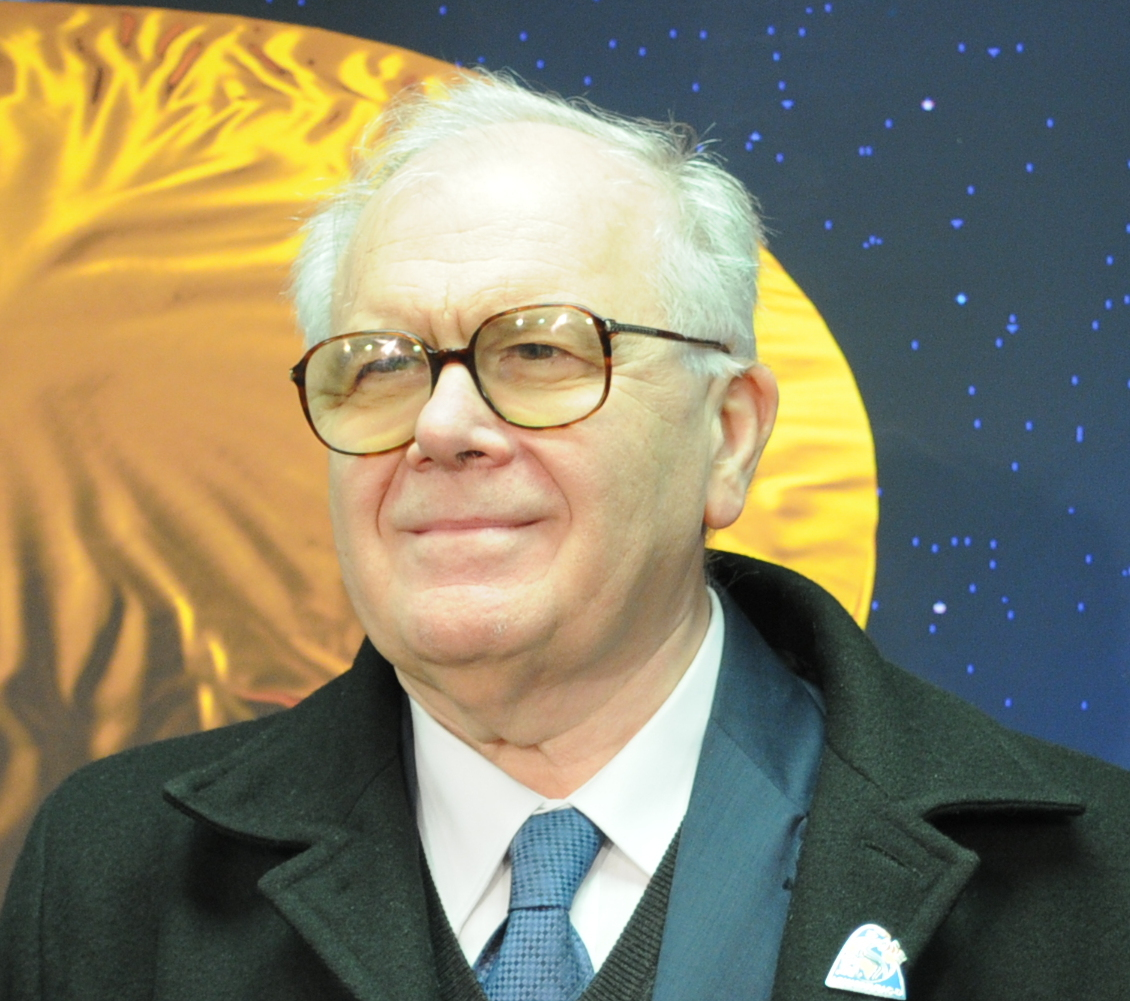
- Conrado Franco Varotto
- Born: 13 August 1941 (age 85); Padua, Italy
- Citizenship: Argentina
- Education: Instituto Balseiro
- Awards: Platinum Premio Konex In Physics and Nuclear Technology, for the decade 1982-1992, (1993)
- Scientific career
- Fields: Physics, Nuclear science, Space science
- Workplaces: Comisión Nacional de Actividades Espaciales

Conrado Franco Varotto (born 13 August 1941) is a physicist who is the former executive and technical director of the Comisión Nacional de Actividades Espaciales (CONAE), Argentine space agency.

== Biography ==
Born in Brugine, Italy, he arrived in his childhood to Argentina where he received his doctorate in physics at the Instituto Balseiro (1968). He promoted the creation of INVAP, a technology company, as its first General and Technical Manager between 1976-1991. From January 1994 to May 2018 he served as the technical and executive director of CONAE.

In 2018, he received the Houssay Career Award and was named Researcher of the Nation.
