= Mario Garavaglia =

Argentine physicist

- Born: Mario Garavaglia; 27 August 1937; Junín, Buenos Aires Province, Argentina
- Occupation: Physicist
- Known for: Development of laser technology in Argentina

Mario Garavaglia (born 1937) is an Argentine physicist.

== Biography ==
He was born in Junín (Buenos Aires Province, Argentina) in 1937.

In 1999 the International Commission for Optics awarded him the Galileo Galilei Award by unanimous vote for his work on lasers and their applications in industry, medicine and biology and for promoting optics in Latin America.

In 2004 he received the Houssay Career Award.

In 2014, he was the inaugural winner of OSA and OSK's Sang Soo Lee Award, "for his key role in the development of optics and photonics research and education in Argentina."
