= Edda Adler =

Argentinian biologist and chemist

- Born: Edda Adler de Graschinsky; 9 August 1937 (age 89); Los Toldos
- Education: University of Buenos Aires
- Occupations: Chemist, biology

Edda Adler de Graschinsky (b. 9 August 1937) is an Argentine chemist and biologist. She is a senior research of the National Scientific and Technical Research Council (CONICET) and the Institute of Pharmacological Research.

== Biography ==
Edda Adler was born in the Argentinian town of Los Toldos, in the capital's province, on 9 August 1937. She began her university studies in 1995 at the Faculty of Exact and Natural Sciences of the University of Buenos Aires, receiving a degree in chemistry in 1960. The next year, she began her doctoral studies in chemistry, graduating in 1964 with her thesis Poder antibiótico de cepas de Streptomyces aisladas de muestras de tierra de la República Argentina. In this field, Adler has been involved in the study of the factors and mechanisms that regulate the release of neurotransmitters and the role played by endocannabinoids in cardiovascular physiopathology. In 1974, she became a researcher at CONCICET, once serving as its Director from 1997 to 1998. She became the executive director of the Institute of Pharmacological Research 1991, and led it until 2003.
