= Elena Chiozza =

Argentine geographer

Margarita Elena Chiozza (26 October 1919 – 8 January 2011) was an Argentine geographer. She graduated in history from the Faculty of Arts at the University of Buenos Aires.

She directed the collection Atlas Total de la República Argentina del Centro Editor de América Latina, La Argentina. Suma de Geografía y El País de los Argentinos. She also created the environmental information program at the National University of Luján. She received a Doctor Honoris Causa from the National University of Luján and the National University of Comahue Honorary Member of the Center for Studies Alexander von Humboldt and the National Academy of Geography.

She coordinated various academic committees. In 2010, she received the Rebeca Gerschman Award for her academic work. She died a month before she could attend the reception ceremony. Chiozza was a member of the advisory board of the La Aljaba. Revista de Estudios de la Mujer.

== Selected works ==
- La Patagonia. Colección: Mi país, tu país. Enciclopedia argentina de la escuela y el hogar, Susana Zanetti directora. Centro Editor de América Latina, Buenos Aires, 1969.
- Estancias patagónicas. Colección: Mi país, tu país. Enciclopedia argentina de la escuela y el hogar, Susana Zanetti directora. Centro Editor de América Latina, 1969.
- El país de los argentinos. La Patagonia. La Antártida Argentina. El nordeste. Centro Editor de América Latina, Buenos Aires, 1976.
- ¿Qué es la Argentina? Informe técnico. Colección: El país de los argentinos, Elena Chiozza directora. Centro Editor de América Latina, Buenos Aires, 1977.
- Atlas total de la República Argentina. Centro Editor de América Latina, Buenos Aires, 1981.
- "La integración del Gran Buenos Aires". En Buenos Aires, historia de cuatro siglos. Editorial Abril, Buenos Aires, 1983.
- Prólogo al libro La valoración del país: la República Argentina, 1920, de Pierre Denis. Solar, Buenos Aires, 1987.
- Colaboradora en el libro Territorios y ambientes en el mundo comtemporáneo: 3.^{er} ciclo EGB. Aique, Buenos Aires, 1998.
- Introducción a la geografía, junto con Cristina Teresa Carballo. Prometeo - Universidad de Quilmes, Buenos Aires, 2006.

== Bibliography ==
- Hiernaux Daniel y Lindón Alicia. Tratado de geografía humana. Editorial Anthropos, Buenos Aires, 2006. ISBN 84-7658-794-5. (in Spanish)
