= Gabriel A. Rabinovich =

Argentine biochemist

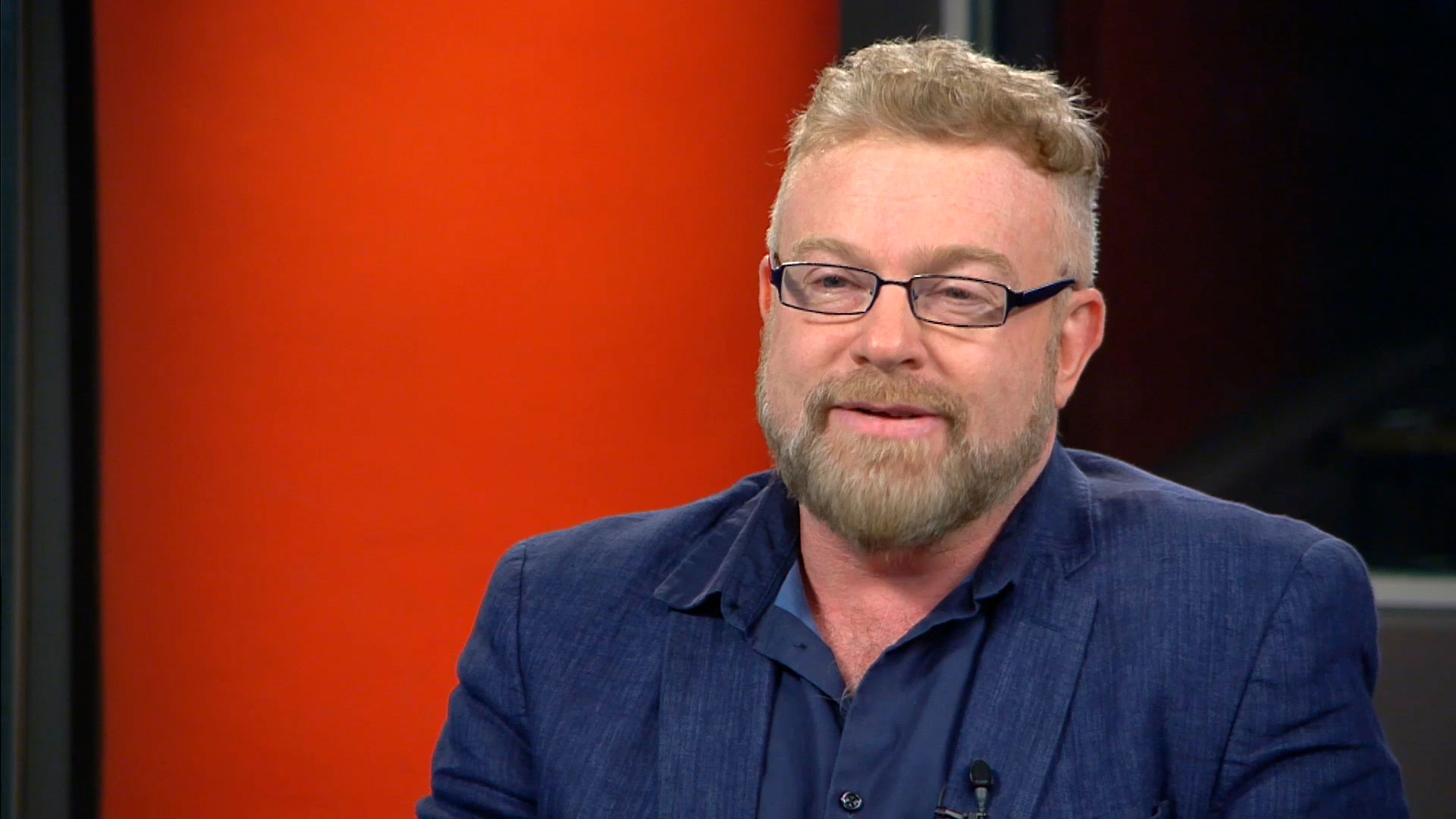
Image of Dr. Gabriel Rabinovich

Gabriel A. Rabinovich is an Argentine biochemist who is currently a professor at the School of Exact and Natural Sciences at the University of Buenos Aires. He is also the deputy director of Immunopathology Laboratories, and the head of Structural and Functional Glycomic Laboratories.

Rabinovich has conducted research on effective tumor immunotherapy. He looked at different ways in which tumors overcome immune responses and how such tumors can be regressed. He also looked at the properties of galectins, and how they show potential for disease.

== Early life ==
Rabinovich was born in Córdoba, Argentina in 1969. He graduated from the School of Chemical Sciences at National University of Córdoba in 1993 with a Biochemistry degree. He then earned a Ph.D. in Immunology while at the same university in 1999.

After graduating, Rabinovich obtained a post-doctoral position at the University of Buenos Aires. He is also a member of the Argentine National Academy of Science, was a visiting professor at multiple universities, and is on 12 different journal Editorial Boards. He is now a full-time professor of Immunology and a senior investigator with the National Research Council.

== Research and current work ==
Rabinovich has published over 200 articles which have received more than 12,000 citations. His work alongside his colleagues at the Laboratory of Immunopathology and Glycomedicine involves galectins and their immunoregulatory functions. They found that galectin-glycan interactions are crucial to immune response to reduce inflammation while also preventing autoimmunity and promoting immune.

In 1999, Rabinovich and his colleagues looked at the therapeutic effects of GAL-1 and the mechanisms it uses in a collagen-induced arthritis model. They administered recombinant GAL-1 daily and found it to lead in reduction of anticollagin immunoglobin levels. They also found GAL-1 to inhibit proinflammatory response, and that there is a correlation between the apoptotic properties in vitro with the immunomodulatory properties in vivo. They concluded that this could lead to a therapeutic treatment of helper T cell type 1-mediated autoimmune disorders.

In 2002, Rabinovich worked alongside other scientists to look further into galectins and their ligands. They found that some members of the galectin family inhibited the inflammatory response while others enhanced it. Their research showed that galectins work to regulate cell signaling, growth, secretions, and other interactions which affect the inflammatory response to tumor progression.

In 2004, Rabinovich and his colleagues further researched the galectin-1 gene and found that if this gene is inhibited in vivo, it promotes tumor rejection while stimulating tumor-specific T cell responses. They concluded that this finding could be used in cancer immunotherapy by promoting the response of these tumor-specific T cells.

In 2007, Rabinovich and his colleagues made progress toward development of drugs for thrombosis, inflammation, and tumor progression. They did this through a comparative study in which they obtained fucoidans from brown algae and looked at the responses to leucocytes, thrombin, coagulants, and carcinoma cells.

In 2008, Robinovich found that glycan contains information that is prevalent in the development of cancer and autoimmune diseases. Glycosylation is important for recognizing pathogens but also for controlling immune homeostasis and modulating immune response. In 2018, he continued to look at galectin-driven regulation and how galectin-glycan interactions play a role in autoimmune inflammation.

In 2019, Rabinovich worked with his colleagues to study Gal-12 and found that it promoted angiogenesis in vitro by influencing endothelial cells. They also found that adipose tissue homeostasis could be controlled by controlling endothelial cells through glycosylation-dependent pathways. Under hypoxic conditions, the regulation of this gene increased, and Gal-12 plays an important role in adipose tissue for both differentiation and homeostasis.

As of March 2020, Rabinovich and his colleagues published a patent for their invention of kits and methods which use galectin-1 to diagnose, monitor, treat, and modulate lymphoproliferate disorders and angiogenesis disorders associated with hypoxia after a transplant. The method detects and monitors the level of Gal-1.

== Awards and honors ==
- In 2004 Rabinovich received the Bernardo Houssay Medal from the Ministry of Science and Technology
- In 2005 he received the Bunge & Born Prize for Young Scientist and the Mizutani Foundation Award for Glycoscience
- In 2010 he received the Third World Academy of Science Prize in Medical Sciences
- In 2013 he was awarded the Platinum Konex Award in Biomedicine
- In 2014 he received the Highest Prize of Bunge & Born Foundation for Life Achievements in Argentina
- In 2023 he received the Diamond Konex Award in Science and Technology
