= Rosa Muchnik de Lederkremer =

Argentine chemist

- Born: 12 January 1932 (age 94); Buenos Aires, Argentina
- Education: University of Buenos Aires
- Occupations: Chemist, educator
- Spouse: Gerardo Lederkremer (m. 1960; died 2018)
- Awards: Konex Award (1983, 2013); Bernardo Houssay Award (2003)

Rosa Muchnik de Lederkremer (born 12 January 1932) is an Argentine chemist. A doctor in chemical sciences, emeritus professor at the University of Buenos Aires (UBA), and senior researcher at the National Scientific and Technical Research Council (CONICET), she has received Konex Awards in the area of Organic Chemistry in 1983 and 2013. Her research includes major contributions in the area of glycobiology through investigating the inhibition of the key enzyme for the survival of Trypanosoma cruzi in the human body.

== Biography ==
Rosa Muchnik was born in Buenos Aires on 12 January 1932, the daughter of Jewish immigrants from Ukraine, who had to flee their homeland because of pogroms and the rise of antisemitism in Europe. She is the firstborn of four siblings. When her father arrived in Argentina, he first settled in the town of Pigüé, and shortly after saving money, he settled in Buenos Aires, where he met her mother.

Rosa Muchnik was married to Gerardo Lederkremer from 1960 until his death in 2018.

== Career ==
Muchnik earned a licentiate in chemical sciences from the UBA Faculty of Exact and Natural Sciences (UBA-FCEN) in 1954, and a doctorate in organic chemistry there in 1956. She completed a scholarship for further training at the Ohio State University, together with Dr. M. L. Wolfrom, from 1962 to 1965, and received a grant from the Fundação de Amparo a Pesquisa do Estado de São Paulo to elucidate the glycoprotein structure of Trypanosoma cruzi in 1977.

She became the first female professor of the Organic Chemistry Department (DQO UBA-FCEN) in 1967. She later served as its director from 1995 to 1999. She was the main impetus for the creation of CONICET's Carbohydrate Research Center, and was its first director from 1995 to 2000.

== Memberships ==
- Argentine Chemical Association
- American Chemical Society, Divisions of Carbohydrate Chemistry and Organic Chemistry
- Argentine Society for Biochemical Research (SAIB)
- Argentine Society for Research in Organic Chemistry (SAIQO)
- Protozoology Society
- Society for Glycobiology
- Brazilian Academy of Sciences

== Awards and distinctions ==
- 1983: Konex Merit Diploma in Organic Chemistry
- 2000: Dr. Venancio Deulofeu Award, Argentine Chemical Association
- 2003: Bernardo Houssay Career Award
- 2008: Consecration Award from the National Academy of Exact and Natural Sciences
- 2013: Konex Platinum Award
