= Diego Golombek =

Argentine chronobiologist

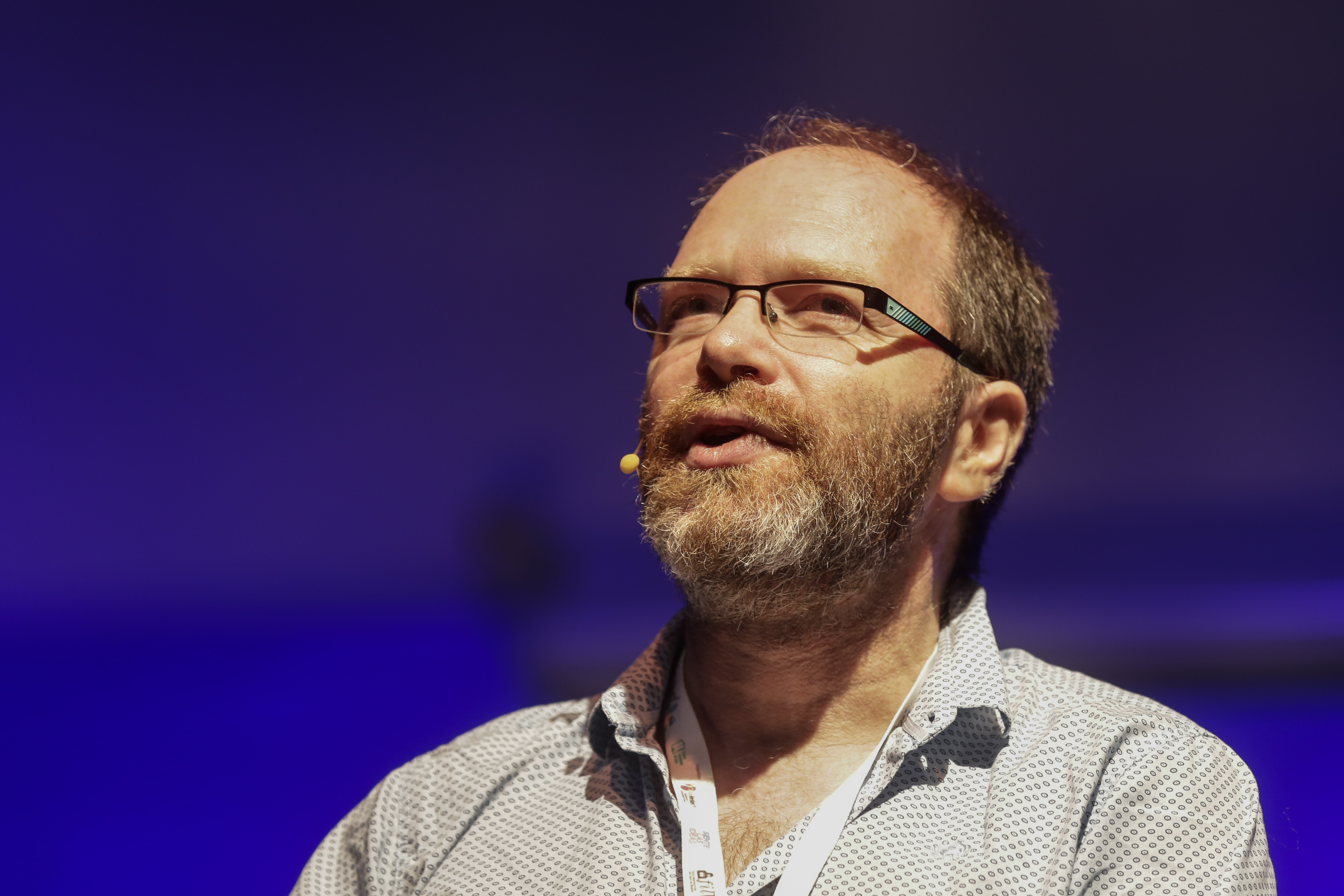
- Diego Golombek in April 2018
- Born: 22 November 1964 (age 61); Buenos Aires, Argentina
- Education: University of Buenos Aires
- Awards: Kalinga Prize (2015)
- Scientific career
- Fields: Chronobiology
- Workplaces: University of Buenos Aires; National University of Quilmes

Diego Golombek (born 22 November 1964) is an Argentine biologist, communicator and popularizer of science. He is currently professor at National University of Quilmes and researcher at CONICET. He is author of several books about biology and related topics, although he is mainly known due to his appearances on radio and television.

== Life ==
He graduated from University of Buenos Aires in 1988 with a magna cum laude degree. Four years later, he obtained a PhD in biology at the same institution. In parallel with his biology career and still in his young years Golombek started to write short stories and poetry. He was awarded several literary prizes in Argentina, Chile and Venezuela.

== Work ==
Golombek is an experienced researcher in chronobiology. In 2007 he received the Ig Nobel Prize for discovering that hamsters recover from jetlag more quickly under the effects of Viagra. He is known for his aim of making biology understandable for laymen; his efforts are mostly intended to make public some aspects of scientists' everyday life, which are usually considered to be hidden or enigmatic. He insists that science is a fundamental resource for increasing the socio-economic activity of an underdeveloped country like Argentina.

He has taken part in Científicos Industria Argentina (English: Scientists Made in Argentina), a TV show hosted by mathematician Adrián Paenza and broadcast by TV Pública. Golombek also hosts his own show in the same channel, which is named Doctor G. It is a children-oriented show, in which he—along with his assistants, Sir from Here and Sir from There—explains the science behind everyday tasks, such as what are the chemical procedures involved in cooking an asado or how a match works.

Moreover, he is editor-in-chief of a collection called "Ciencia que ladra...", printed by Siglo Veintiuno. Its name is a mention to the Spanish version of the proverb "its bark is worse than its bite", but in reference to science.

== Politics ==
In 2016 Golombek became part of a Macri administration think tank which purported to be a "Presidential Council," but he left immediately after the first meeting.

In the wake of 2018 abortion debate in Argentina, he endorsed its legalization arguing that "a group of living cells does not represent a human being".

== Bibliography ==
=== Papers ===
- Agostino, P. V.; Plano, S. A.; Golombek, D. A. (2007). "Sildenafil accelerates reentrainment of circadian rhythms after advancing light schedules". Proceedings of the National Academy of Sciences. 104 (23): 9834–9. Bibcode:2007PNAS..104.9834A. doi:10.1073/pnas.0703388104. PMC 1887561. PMID 17519328.
- Plano, S.; Agostino, P.; Golombek, D. (2007). "Extracellular nitric oxide signaling in the hamster biological clock". FEBS Letters. 581 (28): 5500–5504. Bibcode:2007FEBSL.581.5500P. doi:10.1016/j.febslet.2007.10.058. PMID 17991439.

=== Books ===
- Golombek, Diego (2006). Sexo, drogas y biología. (Y un poco de rock and roll) (in Spanish). Buenos Aires: Siglo Veintuno. ISBN 978-987-1220-70-0.
- Golombek, Diego (comp.) (2007). ADN: cincuenta años no es nada (in Spanish). Buenos Aires: Siglo Veintuno. ISBN 978-987-629-012-8.
- Golombek, Diego (2011). Cavernas y palacios. En busca de la conciencia en el cerebro (in Spanish). Buenos Aires: Siglo Veintuno. ISBN 978-987-629-193-4.
- Golombek, Diego (2012). Demoliendo papers. La trastienda de las publicaciones científicas (in Spanish). Buenos Aires: Siglo Veintuno. ISBN 978-987-629-227-6.
- Golombek, Diego (2012). El nuevo cocinero científico. Cuando la ciencia se mete en la cocina (in Spanish). Buenos Aires: Siglo Veintuno. ISBN 978-987-629-244-3.
- Golombek, Diego (2014). Las neuronas de Dios. Una neurociencia de la religión, la espiritualidad y la luz al final del túnel (in Spanish). Buenos Aires: Siglo Veintuno. ISBN 978-987-629-479-9.

=== Fiction ===
- Golombek, Diego (2012). Así en la tierra (in Spanish). Buenos Aires: Siglo Veintuno. ISBN 978-987-629-254-2.

== Prizes ==
In 2003, he received the Bernardo Houssay Young Researcher Award, and in 2012, he was a recipient of the Houssay Award.

Odisha Chief Minister Naveen Patnaik felicitated UNESCO Kalinga Prize winner 2015 Prof. Diego Andres Golombek at Odisha state secretariat, presenting him a stole and a silver filigree memento.

== See also ==
- List of Ig Nobel Prize winners
