= Hugo Ortega =

American chef and cookbook author (born 1965)

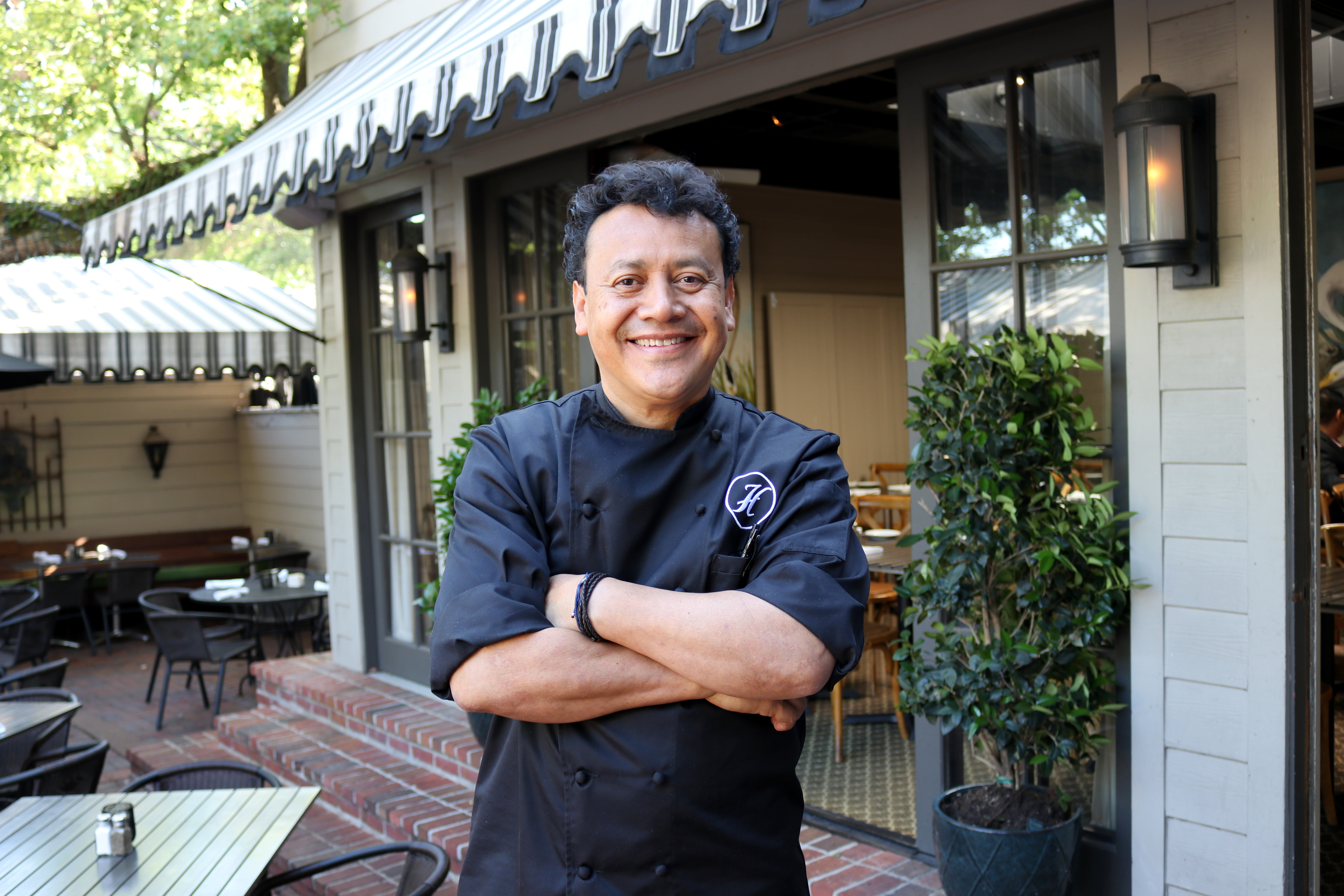
Chef Hugo Ortega

Hugo Ildefonso Ortega (born 1965) is a Mexican-born American chef, cookbook author and 2017 James Beard Award winner for Best Chef: Southwest.

== Early life and education ==
Ortega was born in Mexico City, the oldest in a family of eight children. When he was 10, the family moved to Puebla, Mexico to live with Ortega's grandmother on her rancho located near the border of Oaxaca. Ortega learned the fundamentals of Mexican cooking from his mother and grandmother, making everything from scratch. He was also the goat herder for the family. When he was 14, the family returned to Mexico City and Ortega began working at a local factory to help support the family.

After several failed attempts to cross the border, Ortega arrived in Houston in 1984. He began working as a janitor and dishwasher before being left with no work and no home. A friend took Ortega to Backstreet Cafe where he found employment as a dishwasher/busboy.

Vaught, owner of Backstreet Cafe and Prego, offered him a position on the line in the kitchen. He was eventually promoted to the kitchen at Prego, where he worked side-by-side with Executive Chef John Watt. Vaught helped enroll Ortega in the Culinary Arts program at Houston Community College, from which he graduated in November 1992.

Ortega and Vaught were married in 1994. Ortega became a U.S. citizen in 1996.

== Professional career ==
=== Chef and restaurateur ===
Under the umbrella of H Town Restaurant Group, which he co-owns with his wife and fellow restaurateur Tracy Vaught, Ortega is executive chef of Backstreet Cafe, Hugo's, Caracol, Xochi and URBE. He is also a partner in Origen in Oaxaca, Mexico. Ortega also helped create a menu for Mi Almita, a concept opened by Chef Michael Mina in Honolulu in 2018 (now closed).

In 2002, Ortega and Vaught opened Hugo's restaurant in the Montrose area of Houston, serving Authentic Regional Mexican Cuisine. In 2013, Ortega and Vaught opened Caracol, a Coastal Mexican Kitchen, in the Galleria area of Houston. In January 2017, H Town Restaurant Group opened Xochi in the Marriott Marquis Houston Downtown. The restaurant opened two weeks before Houston hosted Super Bowl LI, hosting celebrities, celebrity chefs and visitors during the game festivities.

In 2019, Vaught established the Hugo Ortega Endowment Houston Community College's Culinary Arts Program to support current and future HCC culinary students. The lobby of the new building is named in Hugo's honor and features a namesake wall.

Ortega and wife Tracy Vaught opened URBE Street Food of Mexico in 2021, which has recipes from Ortega's first cookbook Hugo Ortega's Street Food of Mexico.

Ortega has made two guest chef appearances at the James Beard House in New York City (1997 & 1999). He has also hosted three James Beard Foundation events in Houston.

=== Author ===
He is also author of two cookbooks - Hugo Ortega's Street Food of Mexico (2012) and Backstreet Kitchen – Seasonal Recipes from Our Neighborhood Cafe (2013), which recognizes Backstreet Cafe's 30th anniversary.

=== Media appearances ===
Ortega was featured on the program CBS Sunday Morning: the “Sunday Profile” on the annual “The Food Issue” show (November 19, 2017), spotlighting Ortega's American Dream journey.

In 2018, Ortega's namesake restaurant was featured on “The Zimmern List” hosted by American chef, restaurateur, television and radio personality and food critic Andrew Zimmern for having one of the best brunches in the county.

Ortega appeared as a guest judge in Top Chef, judging elimination challenges in episode 1 of Season 19, which was filmed in Houston.

In October 2023, Ortega was highlighted on Qué Delicia: El Sabor de América on ViX.

== Current restaurants ==
- Backstreet Cafe (Houston)
- Hugo's (Houston)
- Caracol (Houston)
- Xochi (Houston)
- URBE (Houston)
- Origen (Oaxaca, Mexico)

== Awards ==
- Best Chef: Southwest at 2017, James Beard Awards (2017)
- Craig Claiborne Lifetime Achievement Award, Southern Foodways Alliance (2017)

== Bibliography ==
- Hugo Ortega's Street Food of Mexico (2012)
- Backstreet Kitchen – Seasonal Recipes from Our Neighborhood Cafe (2013)
