= Alberto Kornblihtt =

Argentine molecular biologist

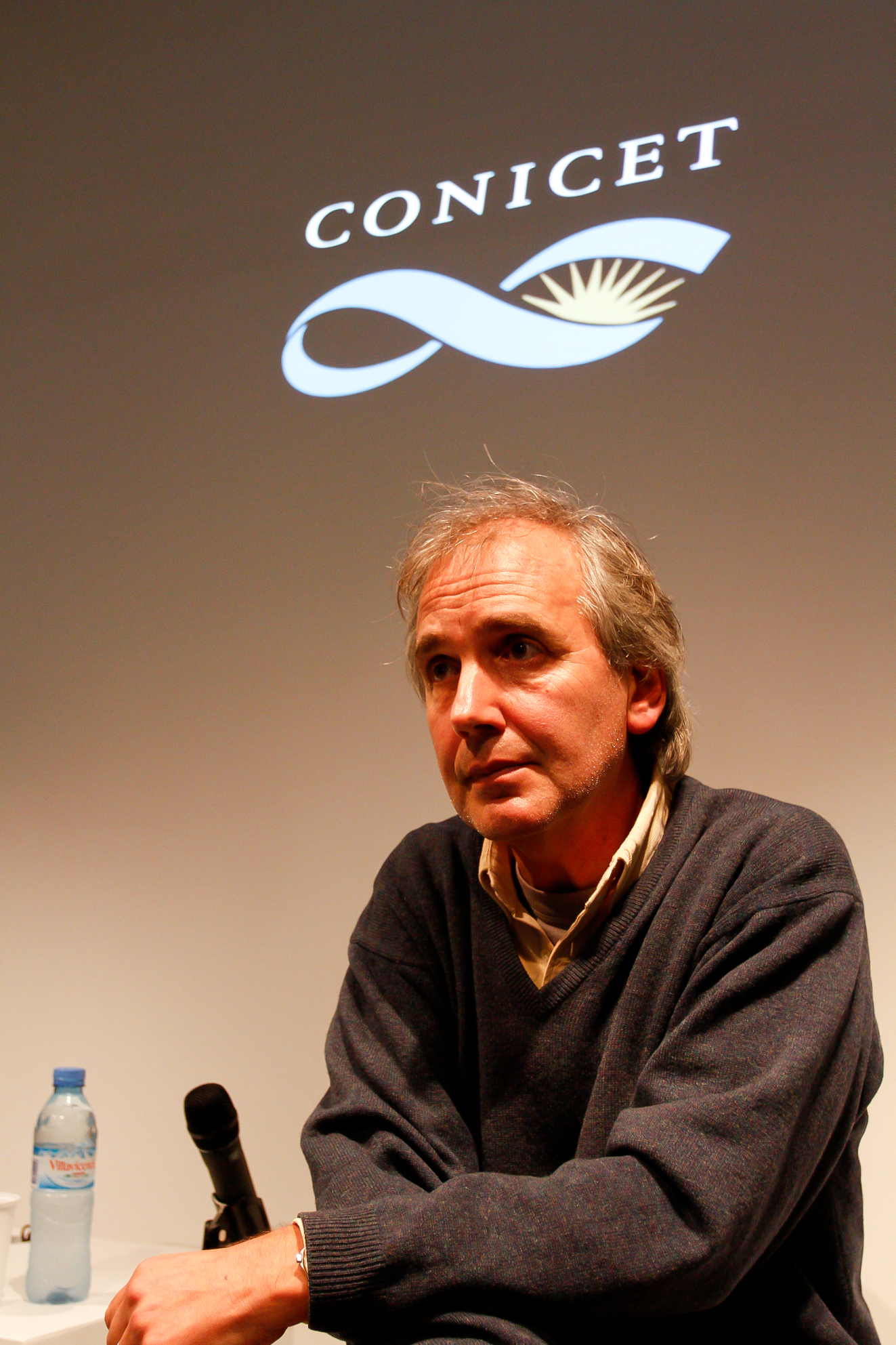
Kornblihtt at CONICET

Alberto Kornblihtt (born June 30, 1954) is an Argentine molecular biologist who specializes in alternative ribonucleic acid splicing. During his postdoctoral training with Francisco Baralle in Oxford, Kornblihtt documented one of the first cases of alternative splicing, explaining how a single transcribed gene can generate multiple protein variants. Kornblihtt was elected as a foreign associate of the National Academy of Sciences of the United States in 2011, received the Diamond Award for the most relevant scientist of Argentina of the decade, alongside physicist Juan Martin Maldacena, in 2013, and was incorporated to the Académie des Sciences of France in 2022.

== Personal life ==
Kornblihtt is married, with two adult sons. Outside of his research, Kornblihtt appreciates the opportunity to teach undergraduate biology students at the University of Buenos Aires. In his free time, Kornblihtt enjoys cooking, classical music, numerous genres of literature, etymology, and is a life-long lover of cinema.

== Early life and education ==
Alberto Kornblihtt was born on June 30, 1954, in Buenos Aires, Argentina. His parents taught mathematics and geography, providing Kornblihtt and his two siblings, who also pursued careers in science and education, with an environment for knowledge and learning at an early age. When he was 16 years old, Kornblihtt enrolled in a high school botany and biology class instructed by Rosa Guaglianone, allowing Kornblihtt the opportunity to perform laboratory and microscopy work. This experience launched Kornblihtt's interest in DNA and mRNA. Following high school, Kornblihtt continued his education at the Facultad de Ciencias Exactas y Naturales (School of Sciences) of the University of Buenos Aires, earning a Biology degree in 1977. In 1980, Kornblihtt went on to earn his PhD in biochemistry from Campomar Foundation in Buenos Aires, under the mentorship of Héctor Torres. Kornblihtt then relocated to Oxford, where he held a postdoctoral position from 1981 through 1984 at the Sir William Dunn School of Pathology. Kornblihtt worked with Professor Francisco Barralle during his postdoctoral research, and together, they were successful in cloning the human fibronectin gene. They determined that fibronectin, an important glycoprotein for cell adhesion and tissue repair, was alternatively spliced and could result in the generation of twenty polypeptides.

== Research ==
After completing his postdoctoral research in Oxford, Kornblihtt returned to Argentina in 1984 and accepted a position as an assistant professor of molecular and cell biology at Facultad de Ciencias Exactas y Naturales at the University of Buenos Aires. In 1991 he was appointed full professor and at present he is professor emeritus. Kornblihtt is also a senior CONICET investigator of the CONICET and works with a research team to study the regulation of alternative ribonucleic acid splicing. Alternative splicing occurs during gene expression, allowing exons from a gene to be excluded or included, resulting in a single gene generating multiple proteins. Major projects in Kornblihtt's lab focus on: 1) Coupling transcription with alternative splicing; 2) Alternative splicing and Chromatin; 3) Alternative splicing and spinal muscular atrophy; 4) Ultraviolet light irradiation and alternative splicing; and 5) Alternative splicing in plants.

== Research on coupling transcription with alternative splicing ==
Kornblihtt's lab focuses on the mechanisms that couple transcription with alternative splicing for the regulation of alternative pre-mRNA splicing. Transcription is the process in which a genetic sequence of a gene is transcribed, or changed, from DNA into RNA, to allow for protein production. One of the most significant accomplishments in Kornblihtt's research came in 1997. Kornblihtt's research team was able to an alternative splicing assay combined with promoter swapping to demonstrate that transcription promoters affect the outcome of splicing They later determined that the coupling of transcription and splicing is dependent upon transcriptional elongation speed, or kinetic coupling, and the impact of transcribing RNA polymerase II on splicing. Kornblihtt's research has found that elongation affects alternative splicing events, with slow elongation increasing inclusion of approximately 80% of exons and skipping of approximately 20% in mammalian cells.

=== More on alternative splicing and chromatin ===
An additional area of Kornblihtt's study investigated the impact of chromatin structure on alternative splicing. Kornblihtt's research team demonstrated that alternative splicing is impacted by chromatin structure and the rate of transcription. They found that a tighter chromatin structure provides lower rates of elongation and looser chromatin structures provide a higher rate of elongation of transcription. These studies further contributed to the relationship between alternative splicing and epigenetics, which Kornblihtt's team used in studying potential therapies for Skeletal Muscular Atrophy.

=== Research on alternative splicing and spinal muscular atrophy ===
Spinal Muscular Atrophy (SMA) is a hereditary degenerative disease of the central nervous system resulting from a spinal motor neuron (SMN) protein shortage. This is due to the deletion or mutation of Survival of Motor Neuron 1 (SMN1). Due to the faulty SMN1 gene, SMA patients do not have enough SMN protein. SMA patients must depend on Survivor of Motor Neurons 2 (SMN2), a gene that all humans have. SMN2 cannot produce sufficient full-length protein for the motor neurons to signal muscles due to sequence differences and the exclusion of exon 7, resulting in the overall SMN protein deficiency. As a treatment strategy for SMA, the first FDA-approved drug, known as Spinraza was developed by Dr. Adrian Krainer and his Cold Spring Harbor Laboratory colleagues. Spinraza is an oligonucleotide that works to activate SMN2 to make more SMN protein in SMA patients. In 2015, the families of Spinal Muscular Atrophy patients encouraged Kornblihtt and Krainer to work together to improve the effectiveness of Spinraza or to develop alternative therapies to be used in conjunction with Spinraza. Kornblihtt's research team focuses on epigenetic strategies, a different mechanism than used Spinraza, to increase SMN protein from the SMN2 gene. Epigenetics studies changes in gene expression, without alteration to the DNA sequence. In 2017 and 2019, Kornblihtt received three separate grants from CURE SMA and FAME (Families of SMA, Argentina) to support continued work on his projects "Epigenetics in SMN2 E7 Alternative Splicing" and "Epigenetics in SMN2 E7 Alternative Splicing II". In these projects, Kornblihtt's team has worked on the regulation of alternative pre-mRNA splicing to develop new mechanisms for SMN protein development, using a single gene to generate multiple proteins. Kornblihtt's lab continues to work on the SMN2 gene for SMA therapy that focus specifically on exon 7 inclusion to work in conjunction with oligonucleotide treatments, such as Spinraza.

== Other research ==
=== UV-induced DNA damage ===
As a continuation of their longterm research on alternative splicing, Kornblihtt's team also studied the impact DNA damage induced by Ultraviolet light (UV) irradiation on alternative splicing in human skin cells. Their research demonstrated that the DNA-damage response to sunlight causes phosphorylation of the RNA polymerase and slowing of the enzyme. Through their research, they found that UV irradiation is necessary to trigger the alternative splicing of many genes and promoting the death of damaged or mutated cells.

=== Alternative splicing in plants ===
Adding to their research performed on human cells, Kornblihtt's team expanded their research to study transcription and alternative splicing in plants. The plant Arabidopsis thaliana was used to investigate how external lighting conditions affected alternative splicing. Research showed that the chloroplast, where photosynthesis occurs, senses light and sends a signal to the cell nucleus to regulate alternative splicing. As previously found in mammalian cells, Kornblihtt's team demonstrated that alternative splicing in plants responds to the kinetic coupling mechanism. Their research further showed that light promotes elongation in RNA polymerase II (Pol II) while elongation is lowered in darkness.

== Honors and awards ==
- In 1991, Kornblihtt received the Guggenheim Memorial Foundation Fellowship in Natural Sciences, awarded on the basis of previous achievement and basis of prior achievement and outstanding promise.
- Between 2002 and 2017, Kornblihtt received the International Research Scholar of the Howard Hughes Medical Institute (HHMI) Award, given to scientists outside of the United States who have notably contributed to biological science research.
- In 2003 and 2013, Kornblihtt was the recipient of the Konex Platinum Award, a cultural award given to Argentines in different fields of work.
- From 2000 through 2008, Kornblihtt was awarded as a chair from the Fundacion Antorchas.
- In 2010, Kornblihtt was the recipient of the Bicentennial Medal.
- In 2010, Kornblihtt was elected as Investigator of the Argentine Nation Prize, granted by the President of Argentina.
- From 2010 – 2011, Kornblihtt served as the President of the Argentine Society for Biochemistry and Molecular Biology (SAIB).
- From 2010 – 2015, Kornblihtt served as a member of the Board of Reviewing Editors of Science.
- In 2011, Kornblihtt received Honorary Mention, Domingo Faustino Sarmiento of the Argentine Senate.
- In 2011, Kornblihtt was elected as a Foreign Associate of the National Academy of Sciences of the United States of America
- In 2012, Kornblihtt was awarded the TWAS prize in Medical Sciences, an award given to individual scientists in developing countries for outstanding scientific contributions.
- In 2012, Kornblihtt was elected foreign member of EMBO (European Molecular Biology Organization).
- In 2013, Kornblihtt was a recipient of the Diamond Award for the most relevant scientist of Argentina of the decade, alongside physicist Juan Martin Maldacena.
- In 2022, Kornblihtt was elected as foreign member of the Académie de Sciences of France.
- Kornblihitt is a three-time recipient of the CURE SMA and FAME Grant in 2017, 2019 and 2023 for his research projects, Epigenetics in SMN2 E7 Alternative Splicing" and "Epigenetics in SMN2 E7 Alternative Splicing II".
