= John Arnold Lovern =

Scottish marine biologist and scientific writer

Dr. John Arnold Lovern FRIC FRSE OBE (b.1905) was a Scottish marine biologist and scientific writer.

== Life ==
He was born in England on 27 May 1906. He studied Science at Liverpool University and continued as a postgraduate, gaining both a PhD and a DSc. He became Director of the Torry Marine Research Station near Aberdeen.

In 1960 he was elected a Fellow of the Royal Society of Edinburgh. His proposers were William Ogilvy Kermack, George Adam Reay, David Cuthbertson, and James Robert Matthews. Lovern resigned in 1970.

== Publications ==
- Fat Metabolism in Fishes
- Variation in the Chemical Composition of Herring (1938) with Dr Henry Wood
- The Chemistry of Lipids (1955)
