= National Scientific and Technical Research Council =

Argentine organization dedicated to the promotion of science and technology

- Consejo Nacional de Investigaciones; Científicas y Técnicas

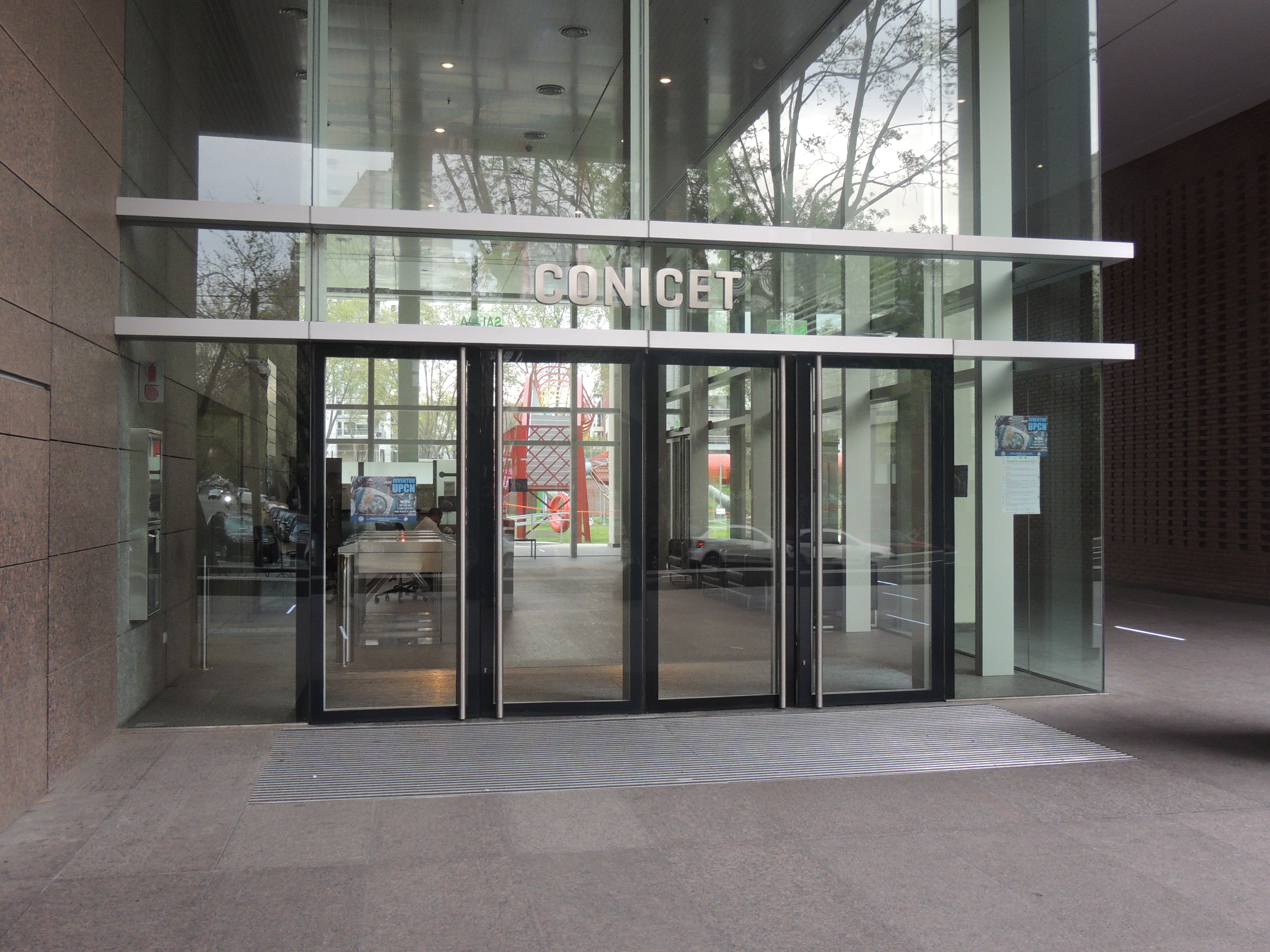
- Conicet offices in Buenos Aires

Agency overview
- Formed: 5 February 1958; 68 years ago
- Headquarters: Buenos Aires, Argentina; 34°34′57″S 58°25′44″W
- Employees: 16,026 (2025)
- Annual budget: ARS$518,839,000 (2025)
- Agency executive: Daniel Salamone, President
- Website: conicet.gov.ar

The National Scientific and Technical Research Council (Spanish: Consejo Nacional de Investigaciones Científicas y Técnicas, CONICET) is an Argentine government agency which directs and co-ordinates most of the scientific and technical research done in universities and institutes.

== History ==
The National Scientific and Technical Research Council was established on 5 February 1958 by a decree of the national government. Its first director was Nobel Laureate Bernardo A. Houssay.

Governed by a board independent from the federal government, it funds scientific research in three basic ways. Firstly, it gives grants for collective work to research teams of well-recognized scientists of every discipline, including social sciences and the humanities. Secondly, it has a payroll of about 6,500 researchers and 2,500 technicians working as employees in different categories, from investigador asistente (assistant researcher) to investigador principal (main researcher). Thirdly, it grants scholarships for doctoral and post-doctoral studies to 8,500 young researchers from Argentina and other countries.

== Ranking ==
In 2025, CONICET was ranked as the best Latin American government research institution by the Scimago Institutions Ranking and the 2nd among all research institutions in the region after the Universidade de São Paulo. CONICET holds the 125th position among the most prestigious research institutions worldwide (including universities, governmental and private research institutions, research councils, etc.).

== Programs ==
- Science and Justice: This programs seeks to strengthen collaboration between the scientific community and the judiciary branch.
- VocAr: Seeks to promote scientific culture and create awareness about CONICET's actions and activities within the education community, youth and the general public.
- Memory Commission: Strives to recover records of victims impacted by state terrorism.
- Marine Science Commission: Promotes monitoring and scientific research of Argentinian marine and coastal areas.

== Notable members ==
- Carlos J. Gradin—Argentine archaeologist and member of CONICET
- Andrea Gamarnik—virologist
- Rosa Muchnik de Lederkremer - chemist and member of CONICET
- Alberto Kornblihtt—molecular biologist
- Lino Barañao—biochemist
- Diego Golombek—biologist and popularizer

== See also ==
- INAPL—government organization that works with CONICET
