= Karen Hallberg =

Argentine physicist (born 1964)

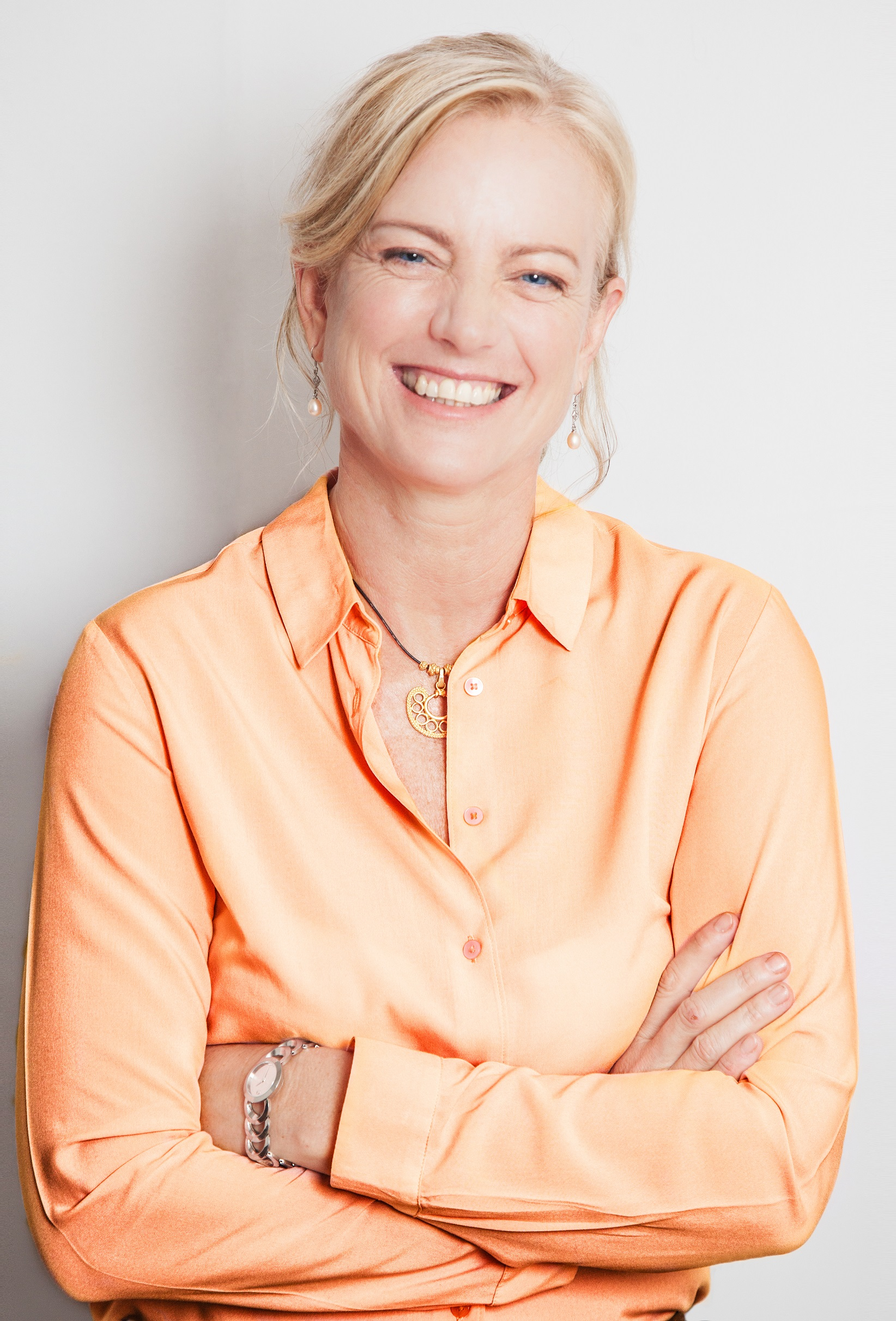
- Hallberg in 2019
- Born: Karen Astrid Hallberg; May 10, 1964 (age 62); Rosario, Argentina
- Education: National University of Rosario; National University of Cuyo; Balseiro Institute
- Awards: L'Oreal-UNESCO Award for Women in Science Laureate (2019)
- Scientific career
- Fields: Physics; Condensed matter Numerical simulations
- Workplaces: Bariloche Atomic Centre; Max Planck Institute for Solid State Research; Max Planck Institute for the Physics of Complex Systems
- Website: fisica.cab.cnea.gov.ar/solidos/personales/hallberg

Karen Astrid Hallberg (born May 10, 1964) is an Argentine scientist and professor of physics at the Balseiro Institute. and at the Bariloche Atomic Centre. She is the secretary general of the Pugwash Conferences on Science and World Affairs. She was awarded the 2019 International L'Oreal-UNESCO Award for Women in Science Prize for Latin America.

== Early life and education ==
Hallberg was born in Rosario, Argentina. When she was two years old she moved with her family to San Salvador de Jujuy, where she received public education at the Belgrano School, the Escuela Normal and the Colegio Nacional de Jujuy. She was known as "señorita por qué" ('Miss why'), and started an all-girls science club. As a teenager Hallberg was a competitive tennis player. She began her studies in electronic engineering at the National University of Rosario. Hallberg earned a scholarship of the National Atomic Energy Commission to study at the Instituto Balseiro, National University of Cuyo, where she earned a degree in physics. She worked alongside Francisco de la Cruz on the emerging field of superconductivity. After completing her graduate degree, she started a doctorate in physics at the Balseiro Institute under the supervision of Dr. Carlos Balseiro. For her doctoral studies Hallberg worked on computational models of quantum materials that demonstrate low dimensional magnetism and superconductivity. When Hallberg arrived at the Bariloche Atomic Centre only 8% of the students were women.

== Research and career ==
After her PhD, Hallberg moved to Germany to work as a postdoctoral researcher at the Max Planck Institute for Solid State Research (MPI-FKF) and at the Max Planck Institute for the Physics of Complex Systems (MPI-PKS). Hallberg returned to the Bariloche Atomic Centre in 1997. She has extensively developed computer simulations to understand quantum matter. She is interested in emergent properties such as conductivity, superconductivity and magnetism. Hallberg is a researcher at National Scientific and Technical Research Council (CONICET) and led the National Atomic Energy Commission (CNEA) condensed matter theory group at the Bariloche Atomic Center. She is a Senior Associate of the International Centre for Theoretical Physics (ICTP) and of the International Center for Theoretical Physics-South American Institute for Fundamental Research (ICTP-SAIFR). Hallberg worked on several numerical tools, including the density matrix renormalization group (DMRG), a numerical method that can be used for low-dimensional strongly correlated bosonic and fermionic systems. She has studied superconductivity, magnetic order and spin-orbit coupling in complex materials and electronic transport in nanoscopic systems. She has visited and collaborated with centers such as the Indian Institute of Sciences (Bangalore), Oxford University (UK), the London Center for Nanotechnology (UK), University of Augsburg (Germany), University of Fribourg (Switzerland), University of Boston and Argonne National Lab (US) and the University of Tokyo.

=== Advocacy and academic service ===
Hallberg has spoken about the need to eliminate institutional barriers for women scientists, and for more support to be available to women. She was awarded the 2019 L'Oréal-UNESCO For Women in Science Award. She has also discussed the need for improved access to science for people from different socioeconomic backgrounds, as well as more recognition for teachers. Hallberg is committed to nuclear disarmament, and is the secretary general of the Pugwash Conferences on Science and World Affairs and member of the advisory board of International Student Young Pugwash (ISYP). She is also committed to ethics in science and was a member of the (now discontinued) Argentine Committee on Ethics in Science and Technology (CECTE). She was a board member of the American Physical Society (APS), member of the World Economic Forum's Global Future Council on Quantum Applications, member of the advisory board of the International Institute of Physics (Natal, Brazil), member of the advisory board of Papers in Physics and member of the Board of Directors of the Bunge and Born Foundation, and member of the editorial board of Physical Review Research (APS). She was director of the Condensed Matter Department at the Atomic Center in Bariloche, editor of the journal Europhysics Letters, member of the Board of Directors of the Aspen Science Center, Argentine representative and board chair of the Latin American Center of Physics (CLAF), Vice Chair of the Low Temperature Commission of the International Union of Pure and Applied Physics (IUPAP), member of the Argentine Physical Association (AFA) Steering Committee and coordinator of the Women in Physics and Ethics subcommittees and the representative of the Argentine Branch to the International Institute for Complex Adaptive Matter (ICAM).

=== Awards and honors ===
Her awards and honors include:

- Students Queen at the National Students Feast, 1980.
- Secretary General, Pugwash Conferences on Science and World Affairs
- 2019 L'Oreal-UNESCO for Women in Science Laureate
- Honorary member, Argentine Center for Engineering
- Corresponding Member of the National Academy for Exact and Natural Sciences, Argentina
- Member, Latin American Academy of Sciences (ACAL)
- Doctor Honoris Causa, National University of Jujuy, Argentina
- Doctor Honoris Causa, Universidad Siglo 21, Argentina
- Honorable Mention by the Argentine Senate "Senator Domingo Faustino Sarmiento"
- Honorable Mention by the Argentine Senate "Juana Azurduy de Padilla"
- Recognition by the Honorable Argentine Chamber of Deputies
- Recognition by the Legislatures of the provinces of Río Negro and Chaco, Argentina
- Illustrious Citizen of the province of Jujuy, Argentina
- Distinguished Citizen of the city of San Salvador de Jujuy, Argentina
- "Bachiller de Honor", Colegio Nacional High School, S. S de Jujuy
- 2007 Guggenheim Fellowship
- 2008 L'Oréal - National Scientific and Technical Research Council Special Mention for her work on quantum properties in nanoscopic systems
- 2012 Aspen Ideas Festival Scholar

== Personal life ==
Hallberg is married to physicist Ingo Allekotte, with whom she has two children. She plays the cello.
