= Huemul =

Huemul may refer to:

- The South Andean deer
- Huemul Island (Isla Huemul)
- Huemul Project

== See also ==
- Huemulite
