= Balseiro =

Balseiro is surname and it may refer to:

- José Antonio Balseiro (1919-1962), Argentinian physicist
- 6109 Balseiro, a main-belt asteroid
- Balseiro Institute, an academic institution
- Puchi Balseiro (1926-2007), a Puerto Rican composer
