= Leopoldo Máximo Falicov =

Argentine physicist (1933–1995)

Leopoldo Máximo Falicov (June 24, 1933 – January 24, 1995) was an Argentine theoretical physicist, specializing in the theory of condensed matter physics.

== Life ==
Falicov was born in Buenos Aires with both parents of Eastern European Jewish origin. His father, Isaías Félix Falicov, was Argentine and his mother, Dora Samoilovich, emigrated to Argentina as a child.

Falicov attended the Colegio Nacional de Buenos Aires and then attended the School of Engineering and Natural Sciences at the University of Buenos Aires (UBA). In 1955 he entered the recently created Institute of Physics, later known, after 1962, as the Balseiro Institute and received his Bachelor's Degree in Physics in May 1958 as a member of the first class of Physicists. Meanwhile, in 1957, he received a Bachelor's Degree in Chemistry from the UBA.

Simultaneously, he was working on his doctoral thesis at the Bariloche Institute of Physics under the direction of José Antonio Balseiro on the subject "Photon packets: their classification, dispersion and formation" which he defended in August 1958, 3 months after finishing his undergraduate degree. It was the first doctoral thesis at the Balseiro Institute.

He continued in 1959 with a scholarship from the British Council at Cambridge University England where he completed a second doctorate under the direction of Professor Volker Heine on the subject "The structure of metal bands", with a defense date of December 8, 1960. He then became a professor at the University of Chicago.

In 1959 he married Marta Puebla whom made his famous Magnesium Fermi Surface in his post doctoral thesis.

In 1969, he moved to Berkeley to work at University of California, Berkeley, heading the department from 1981 to 1983.

Falicov was a member of the National Academy of Sciences, the Royal Danish Academy of Sciences and Letters and the Academia Nacional de Ciencias Exactas, Fisicas y Naturales. He was a fellow of the American Physical Society, the Institute of Physics and the Third World Academy of Sciences.

== Honours ==
A library, Biblioteca Leo Falicov, at the Balseiro Institute is named after him.
