= Hugo Scolnik =

Argentine computer scientist

- Awards: Konex de Platino (2003); ALIO Medal (2024)

Academic background
- Education: PhD (1970), University of Zurich; Licenciado (1964), University of Buenos Aires

Hugo Scolnik is an Argentine mathematician and computer scientist. He is a professor at the University of Buenos Aires. Scolnik has an Honoris Causa Phd from National University of Cuyo and was awarded a Platinum Konex in 2003.

== Career ==
Having received his PhD, Scolnik returned to Argentina to work in the Latin American World Model where he later became the deputy director. He then worked in Brazil at Federal University of Rio de Janeiro and University Cándido Mends. He was twice elected vice president at large of IFORS. He was the first director of the Department of Computing at the University of Buenos Aires.
