= Gaviola =

Gaviola may refer to:

- Cassandra Gaviola (born 1959), American actress known as Cassandra Gava later in her career
- Enrique Gaviola (1900–1989), Argentinian astrophysicist
- Karen Gaviola, American television producer and director

== See also ==
- 2504 Gaviola, main-belt asteroid named after Enrique Gaviola
