= Huemul Project =

Argentine nuclear fusion experiment during the 1950s

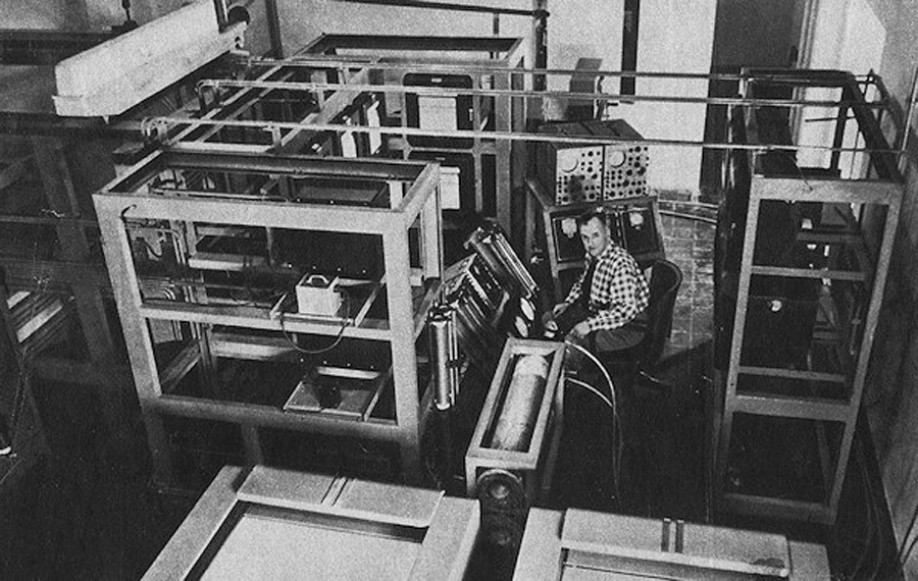
Ronald Richter working during the Huemul Project

The Huemul Project (Spanish: Proyecto Huemul) was an early 1950s Argentine effort to develop a fusion power device known as the Thermotron. The concept was invented by Austrian scientist Ronald Richter, who claimed to have a design that would produce effectively unlimited power. After gaining significant international attention, Richter's claims were later found to be fraudulent.

Richter was able to pitch the idea to President of Argentina Juan Perón in 1948, and soon received massive funding to build an experimental site on Huemul Island, on a lake just outside the town of San Carlos de Bariloche in Patagonia, near the Andes mountains. Construction began late in 1949, and by 1951 the site was completed and carrying out tests. On 16 February 1951, Richter measured high temperatures that suggested fusion had been achieved. On 24 March, the day before an important international meeting of the leaders of the Americas, Perón publicly announced that Richter had been successful, adding that in the future energy would be sold in packages the size of a milk bottle.

A worldwide interest followed, along with significant skepticism on the part of other physicists. Little information was forthcoming: no papers were published on the topic, and over the next year a number of reporters visited the site but were denied access to the buildings. After increasing pressure, Perón arranged for a team to investigate Richter's claims and return individual reports, all of which were negative. A review of these reports was equally negative, and the project was ended in 1952. By this time, the optimism of the earlier news had inspired groups around the world to begin their own research in nuclear fusion.

Perón was overthrown in 1955, and in the aftermath, Richter was arrested for fraud. He appears to have spent periods of time abroad, including some time in Libya. Eventually he returned to Argentina, where he died in 1991.

== Prior to Huemul ==
According to Rainer Karlsch's Hitler's Bomb, during World War II German scientists under Walter Gerlach and Kurt Diebner carried out experiments to explore the possibility of inducing thermonuclear reactions in deuterium using high explosive-driven convergent shock waves, following Karl Gottfried Guderley's convergent shock wave solution. At the same time, Richter proposed in a memorandum to German government officials the induction of nuclear fusion through shock waves by high-velocity particles shot into a highly compressed deuterium plasma contained in an ordinary uranium vessel. The proposal was not carried through.

== Early Argentine nuclear efforts ==
Shortly after his election in 1946, Perón began a purge of Argentina's universities that eventually resulted in over 1,000 professors being fired or quitting, causing a serious setback in Argentine science and lasting enmity between Perón and Argentine intelligentsia. In response, the Physical Association of Argentina (AFA) began to organize as a community to retain links between Argentine scientists, who now spread to industry.

In 1946, the director of the AFA, physicist Enrique Gaviola, wrote a proposal to set up the Comisión Nacional de Investigaciones Científicas (National Scientific Research Commission), arguing that post-World War II friction (leading to the Cold War) would present the opportunity for various Northern Hemisphere scientists to move south to escape limits on their research. In the same paper, Gaviola argued for the formation of a body to explore the peaceful use of atomic power. In spite of the poor relations between the scientific community and the Argentine government, the proposal was seriously studied and Congress debated the matter on several occasions before Perón decided to place it under military control. Gaviola objected, starting a long and acrimonious debate over the nature and aims of the program.

By 1947, plans to form an atomic study group were progressing slowly when the entire issue was shut down by an article in the U.S. political newsmagazine, New Republic. The 24 February 1947 issue contained an article by William Mizelle on "Peron's Atomic Plans", which claimed:

With world famous German atom-splitter Werner Heisenberg invited to come to Argentina by Peron's Government and with a major uranium source discovered in Argentina, that Nation is launching a military nuclear research program to crack Pandora's box of atomic energy wide open. Argentina's determined atomic adventure and its frankly military purposes cannot be dismissed as the impractical dream of a small nation.

International pressure on Argentina following the publication was intense, and the plans were soon dropped. This event appears to have made Perón more determined than ever to both develop atomic energy as well as prove its peaceful intentions.

== Germans in Argentina ==
In 1947, a dossier was provided to Argentina by the Spanish embassy in Buenos Aires listing a number of German aeronautical engineers who were looking to sneak out of Germany. Among them was Kurt Tank, designer of the famed Focke-Wulf Fw 190 and many other successful designs. The dossier was passed to the recently formed Argentine Air Force's Commander in Chief, who passed it to Brigadier César Raúl Ojeda, who was in charge of aerodynamics research. Ojeda and Tank communicated and formulated plans to begin building a jet fighter in Argentina, which would eventually emerge as the FMA IAe 33 Pulqui II.

Just before leaving for Argentina, Tank briefly met Richter in London, where Richter told Tank of his ideas for nuclear-powered aircraft. Richter was at that time doing some work in the German chemical industry. Tank had also contacted a number of other engineers and even famed fighter pilot and Luftwaffe general Adolf Galland. Various members of the group made their way to Argentina under false passports during late 1947 and 1948. The Germans were warmly received by Perón, who effectively gave them a blank cheque in an effort to rapidly develop the Argentine economy. Tank set up an aircraft development plant in Córdoba, and continued to contact other German engineers and scientists who might be interested in joining them. A total of 184 German scientists and engineers are known to have moved to Argentina during this period.

Richter was invited to join the group and arrived in Argentina on 16 August 1948, travelling under the name "Dr. Pedro Matthies". Tank personally introduced him to Perón on 24 August, and Richter pitched Perón on the idea of a nuclear fusion device which would provide unlimited power, make Argentina a world scientific leader, and be of purely civilian intent. Perón was intrigued, and clearly impressed, later telling reporters that "in half an hour he explained to me all the secrets of nuclear physics and he did it so well that now I have a pretty good idea of the subject".

Gaviola, still maintaining pressure to form a nuclear research group, saw all interest evaporate. From that point on he offered his services only as a "member of Richter's firing squad." Other German scientists, including Guido Beck, Walter Seelmann-Eggebert, and the now-elderly Richard Gans quickly realized something was amiss in the entire affair, and began to align themselves with the AFA, steering clear of Richter and the government in general. At an AFA meeting in September 1951, Beck publicly resigned from the University of Buenos Aires over the issue.

== The project ==
Richter was soon given a laboratory at Tank's Córdoba site, but in early 1949 a fire destroyed some of the equipment. Richter claimed it was sabotage, and demanded a more protected location free from spies. When support was not immediately forthcoming, Richter went on a tour, visiting Canada and perhaps the U.S. and Europe as well. A year later, Lise Meitner recalled meeting "a strange Austrian with an Argentine visa" in Vienna, where he demonstrated a device he claimed was a thermonuclear system but which Meitner later dismissed as a chemical effect.

Richter's tour was a thinly veiled threat to leave Argentina, which prompted action. Perón handed the problem of selecting a suitable experimental site to Colonel González, a friend from the 1943 Argentine coup d'état. González selected a location deep within the country's interior on Huemul Island, in Nahuel Huapi Lake, where it would be easy to protect from prying eyes. Construction work began in July, causing a nationwide shortage of brick and cement. Richter moved to the site in March 1950 while construction on Laboratory 1, the reactor, was still ongoing.

In May 1950, Perón formed the National Atomic Energy Commission (CNEA), bypassing Gaviola's earlier efforts and placing himself in the position of president, with Richter and the minister of technical affairs as the other chairs. A year later, he formed the National Atomic Energy Directorate (DNEA), under González, to provide project assistance and logistics support.

When the reactor was finally completed in May, Richter noticed there was no way to access the interior of the 12-metre (39 ft) wide concrete cylinder, requiring a series of holes to be drilled through the 4-metre (13 ft) thick walls. But before this could be completed, Richter declared that a crack on the outside rendered the entire reactor useless, and had it torn down.

While this was taking place, Richter began experiments in the much smaller 2-metre (6 ft 7 in) reactor in Laboratory 2. The experiments injected lithium and hydrogen into the cylinder and discharged a spark through it. The cylinder was supposed to reflect the energy created by these reactions back into the chamber to keep the reaction going. (Note: A condition now known as ignition.) Diagnostic measurements were provided by taking photographs of the spectrum and using Doppler widening to measure the temperature of the resulting reactions.

== Announcement ==
On 16 February 1951, Richter claimed he had successfully demonstrated fusion. He re-ran the experiment for members of the CNEA, later claiming that they had witnessed the world's first thermonuclear reaction.

On 23 February, a technician working for the project expressed his concerns about the claims, suggesting that the measurement was likely due to the accidental tilting of the spectrograph's photographic plate while the experimental run was being set up. Richter refused to re-run the experiment. Instead, a week later he ordered the reactor to be disassembled so a new one could be built that included a magnetic confinement system. Meanwhile, plans for a new Laboratory 1 were started with this new design, this time to be buried underground. A 14-metre (46 ft) deep hole in hard rock was constructed, but Richter changed the design and had the hole filled in with concrete.

On 2 March, Edward Miller, the U.S. Assistant Secretary of Station for Inter-American Affairs, visited Argentina. This was ostensibly to visit the Pan American Games, but in reality was in advance of calling a meeting of American leaders later that month to discuss China's entry into the Korean War. Perón gave Miller an introduction to Richter's work, and Miller filed a memo on it on 6 March. During this period, Perón seized the Argentine newspaper La Prensa, whose editor fled to the U.S. This led to harsh criticism in the U.S. Miller suggested a policy of "masterful inaction", not actively denying support for the project, but simply never providing any.

The leadership meeting was to take place between 26 March and 7 April, by which time the Chinese "emergency" had passed and the war was entering a new phase. Perón then took the opportunity to announce Richter's results to the world. On 24 March, Perón held a press conference at Casa Rosada and stated that:

On February 16, 1951, in the atomic energy pilot plant on Huemul Island... thermonuclear experiments were carried out under conditions of control on a technical scale.

Perón justified the project by noting that Argentina's enormous energy shortage would be addressed by building nuclear plants across the country, and that the energy would be bought and sold in containers the size of a milk bottle. He went on to note that the country was simply unable to afford the cost of developing a uranium-based energy program, or that of a system using tritium, normally generated in special fission plants. Richter's fuel meant the reaction could only take place in a reactor, not a bomb, and he then recommitted the country to exploring only peaceful uses of atomic energy. Richter added that he understood the secret of the hydrogen bomb, but that Perón had forbidden any work on it.

The next day Richter held another press conference on the topic, a meeting that became known as the "10,000 word interview". He explained that a hydrogen bomb required a fission trigger, (Note: The interview occurred prior to the first test of a hydrogen bomb, when the operational concept was still secret.) and that the country was unable and unwilling to build such a device. Very little explanation of the Thermotron was mentioned, beyond the announcement that he used the Doppler effect to measure speeds of 3,300 km/s and that the fuel was either lithium hydride or deuterium which was introduced into pre-heated hydrogen. He was careful to explain that these were small-scale experimental results, and refused to state whether it would work well at the industrial scale. On 7 April, Perón awarded Richter the gold Peronista Party Medal in a highly publicized event.

With the U.S. refusing any support for the program, Richter turned to other countries for equipment. In April, Prince Bernhard of The Netherlands visited Perón, and offered technical help to the project from Philips. A visit by Cornelis Bakker, later the director of CERN, was arranged and a synchrotron and Cockcroft–Walton generator were suggested as possible products of interest. Perón wrote to Richter to arrange the visit, during which Richter refused to show Bakker any of the reactors. In spite of this, Perón offered to fund the purchase of a Cockcroft–Walton generator and a synchrotron from the company.

== Public reaction ==
Shortly after Richter's conference, the matter was discussed in the Bulletin of the Atomic Scientists, where it was noted that Richter's announcement had revealed no details of the system of operation. They also noted that Richter claimed three key advances during experimentation, but failed to mention any of them during the conference. Finally, although the method for measuring temperature was announced, the temperature itself was not. The United States Atomic Energy Commission's (AEC) comment on the announcement was simply that "the Argentine Government announced more than a year ago that it was planning to engage in nuclear research."

American physicists were universally dismissive of the announcement. Among the more famous responses was that of George Gamow, who said "It seemed to be 95% pure propaganda, 4¾% thermonuclear reactions on a very small scale, and the remaining ¼% probably something better." Ernest Lawrence was not so dismissive, noting that, "There is a tendency to laugh it off as being a lot of hot air or something. Well it may be, but we don't know all, and we should make every effort to find out." Edward Teller put it succinctly, "Reading one line one has to think he's a genius. Reading the next line, one realizes he's crazy."

British scientists, at that time working secretly on the z-pinch fusion concept, did not rule out the possibility of small-scale reactions. George Thomson, at that time leading the United Kingdom Atomic Energy Authority (AEA), suggested it was simply exaggerated. This opinion was mirrored by Mark Oliphant in Australia, and Werner Heisenberg and Otto Hahn in Germany. Perhaps the most biting criticism came from Manfred von Ardenne, a German physicist now working in the Soviet Union. He advised that people should ignore Richter's claims, noting that he had worked with Richter during the war and said he confused fantasy with reality.

In May, the United Nations World magazine carried a short article by Hans Thirring, the director of the Institute for Theoretical Physics in Vienna and a well known author on nuclear matters. He stated that "the chances are 99 to 1 that the explosion in Argentina occurred only in the imagination of a crank or a fraud." When Thirring heard the announcement, he had gone searching for anyone that knew Richter from before he arrived in Argentina. He found that Richter had studied under Heinrich Rausch von Traubenberg in the 1930s, who described him as a peculiar eccentric, but von Traubenberg had died in 1944 so there was no way to follow up on the story. Richter's dissertation was never published, and the university in Prague burned during the war. Richter was invited to prepare a rebuttal, which appeared in the July issue. He simply dismissed Thirring as "a typical textbook professor with a strong scientific inferiority complex, probably supported by political hatred."

== Private reaction ==
Although essentially dismissed by the scientific community, the Richter announcement nevertheless had a major effect on the history of controlled fusion experiments.

The most direct outcome of the announcement was its effect on Lyman Spitzer, an astrophysicist at Princeton University. Just prior to leaving for a ski trip to Aspen, Spitzer's father called and mentioned the announcement in The New York Times. Spitzer read the articles and dismissed them, noting the system could not deliver enough energy to heat the gases to fusion temperatures. This led him to begin considering ways to confine a hot plasma for longer periods of time, giving the system enough time to be heated to 10 to 100 million degrees Celsius. Considering the problem of confining a plasma in a toroid pointed out by Enrico Fermi, he hit upon the solution now known as the stellarator. Spitzer was able to use the notoriety surrounding Richter's announcement to gain the attention of the U.S. Atomic Energy Commission with the suggestion that the basic idea of controlled fusion was feasible. He eventually managed to arrange a meeting with the director of the AEC to pitch the stellarator concept.

Researchers in the UK had been experimenting with fusion since 1947 using a system known today as z-pinch. Small experimental devices had been built at the Atomic Energy Research Establishment (AERE, "Harwell") and Imperial College London, but requests for funding of a larger system were repeatedly refused. Jim Tuck had seen the work while in the UK, and introduced z-pinch to his coworkers at Los Alamos in 1950. When Tuck heard of Spitzer's efforts to gain funding, he immediately applied as well, presenting his concept as the Perhapsatron. He felt that Spitzer's claims to have a fast track to fusion were "incredibly ambitious". Both Spitzer and Tuck met with AEC officials in May 1951; Spitzer was granted $50,000 to build an experimental device, while Tuck was turned away empty-handed. Not to be outdone, Tuck soon arranged to receive $50,000 from the director of Los Alamos instead.

When news of the U.S. efforts reached the UK, the researchers there started pushing for funding of a much larger machine. This time they found a much more favorable reaction from the AERE, and both teams soon began construction of larger devices. This work, through fits and starts, led to the ZETA system, the first truly large-scale fusion reactor. Compared to the small tabletop devices built in the U.S., ZETA filled a hangar and operated at energy levels far beyond any other machine. When news of ZETA was made public, the U.S. and Soviet Union were soon demanding funding to build devices of similar scale in order to catch up with the UK.

The announcement had a direct effect on research in the USSR as well. Previously, several researchers, notably Igor Kurchatov and I. N. Golovin had put together a development plan similar to the ones being developed in the UK. They too were facing disinterest on the part of the funding groups, which was immediately swept away when Huemul hit the newspapers.

== Cancellation ==
Argentine physicists were also critical of the announcement, but found little interest on the part of Perón, who was still at odds with the academic mainstream. González was growing increasingly frustrated with Richter, and in February 1952 told Perón that either Richter left the project, or he did. Perón accepted González's resignation and replaced him with his aide, Navy Captain Pedro Iraolagoitía. Iraolagoitía soon began to protest as well, finally convincing Perón to have the project investigated.

Instead of calling upon the local physics community, Perón put together a team consisting of Iraolagoitía, a priest, two engineers including Mario Báncora, and young physicist José Antonio Balseiro, who was at that time studying in England and was asked to return with all haste. The team visited the site for a series of demonstrations between 5 and 8 September 1952.

The committee analyzed Richter's work and published separate reports on the topic on 15 September. Balseiro, in particular, was convinced nothing nuclear was taking place. His report critiqued Richter's claims about how the system was supposed to work, especially the claims that the system was reaching the temperatures needed to demonstrate fusion; he stated that fusion reactions would require something on the order of 40 million kelvin, while the center of the electric arc would be perhaps 4,000 to 100,000 kelvin at most. He then pointed out that Richter's radiation detectors showed large activity whenever the arc was discharged, even if there was no fuel present. Meanwhile, the team's own detectors showed low activity throughout. They reported their findings to Perón on 15 February.

Richter was allowed to officially respond to the report. The government appointed physicists Richard Gans and Antonio Rodríguez to review the first report as well as Richter's response to it. This second group endorsed the findings of the first review panel and found Richter's response inadequate. On 22 November, while Richter was in Buenos Aires, a military team occupied the site. They found that many of the instruments were not even connected, and the project was pronounced a fraud. Argentines jokingly referred to the affair as the Huele a mula, or "it smells like a con".

== After the project ==
In the period immediately after the military takeover, Balseiro wrote a proposal to create a nuclear physics institute on the mainland in nearby Bariloche using the equipment on the island. Originally known as the Instituto de Física de Bariloche, it was renamed the Instituto Balseiro in his honour in 1962.

Between 1952 and 1955, Richter was effectively under house arrest in Buenos Aires, with an offer from Perón to "facilitate any travel he might have to make". After Perón was deposed in September 1955, the new government arrested Richter on the night of 4 October 1955. He was accused of fraud, and spent a short time in jail. At the time, it was estimated that 62.5 million Pesos had been spent on the project, about $15 million USD ($182 million in 2025). A more recent estimate places the value closer to $300 million in 2003 dollars ($525 million in 2025).

Richter remained in Argentina for a time, but began to travel, eventually landing in Libya. He returned to Argentina and was extensively interviewed by Mario Mariscotti for his book on Huemul, which remains the most detailed account of the project. Mariscotti blames the affair primarily on Richter, who Mariscotti states was capable of great self-delusion, adding an autocratic and paranoid management style, and lack of oversight to the ills.

Perón remains a controversial figure to this day, and opinions of Richter tend to be colored by how closely the author associates him with Perón. Argentine accounts often refer to Richter as an outright con man, while accounts written outside Argentina generally describe him as a deluded amateur.

== Huemul today ==
The island remained closed and under military control until the 1970s, when the Army began using it for artillery target practice. In 1995 a tourist company took control of the island, and began to offer tours by boat from docks in Bariloche. The ruins of the historic facilities (at 41°06′23″S 71°23′42″W), can be visited by tourists by boat from the port of Bariloche.
