= Yelpidifor Kirillov =

Soviet physicist (1883–1964)

Yelpidifor Anempodistovich Kirillov
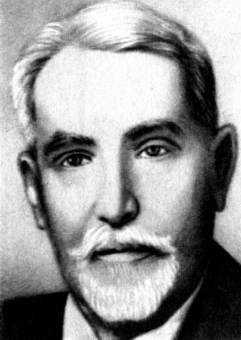
- Born: 8 October 1883; Shipka, Russian Empire
- Died: November 27, 1964 (aged 81); Odessa, USSR
- Education: Novorossiysk University
- Known for: Negative photoelectric effect
- Scientific career
- Fields: physics, optics
- Workplaces: Novorossiysk University, Odessa State Medical University

Yelpidifor Anempodistovich Kirillov (8 October 1883 – 27 November 1964) was a Soviet physicist, doctor of physical-mathematical sciences, the founder of the Odessa scientific school in the field of photography.

== Biography ==
Yelpidifor Kirillov was born in Shipka. He graduated from the Mathematics Department of Physics and Mathematics of the Novorossiysk University in 1907 with a first degree and was kept at the department of physics in preparation for an academic career. From 1908 to 1915, he worked as an assistant at the University for Women, also worked part-time observer of the magnetic-meteorological observatory, and then in the Department of Physics and Mathematics Department of Physics University of Novorossiysk on the assistant position again. In 1915 Kirillov was promoted to master's degree, and was elected assistant professor in the Department of Physics.

From 1921 he headed the department of experimental physics. In 1926 joined as Director of Institute of Physics at the Odessa University, which he held until his death. In 1939 on the proposal of the Soviet Academy of Sciences awarded him the degree of Doctor of Physical and Mathematical Sciences without defending a thesis. During World War II Kirillov continued his work in an evacuated university in Maykop, and then in Baýramaly. In the period from 1944 to 1950 Kirilov also headed the department of physics at the Odessa State Medical University.

== Scientific activities ==
The main scientific activity of Yelpidifor Kirillov was in the field of optics. It contains a study of optical and photoelectric effects in silver halides, internal photoelectric effect, the physical basis of the photographic process. During his time at the Institute of Physics Professor Kirilov has created the scientific school of photography and problems associated to the optical and photoelectric properties of crystals.

In 1930 Kirillov discovered the negative photoelectric effect (a decrease of current when exposed to light), studied its spectrum and showed that it is associated with the formation of the latent image, thereby establishing the connection between photoelectric and photochemical processes. In the period from 1946 to 1953 Kirillov performed a series of studies of the absorption spectra of lightly colored by light thin layers of silver halide, finding in them the fine structure of the absorption bands of the photochemical coloration and the latent image. For the discovery and study of the fine structure of the absorption spectrum of photochemically colored silver halide awarded in 1952 the USSR State Prize.

== Other ==
Professor Kirillov helped the arrival in the Soviet Union in 1935 of the famous German physicist Guido Beck, who laid the foundation of theoretical physics in Odessa.

Kirillov died in Odessa, aged 81.
