= Francis Mallmann =

Argentine chef (born 1956)

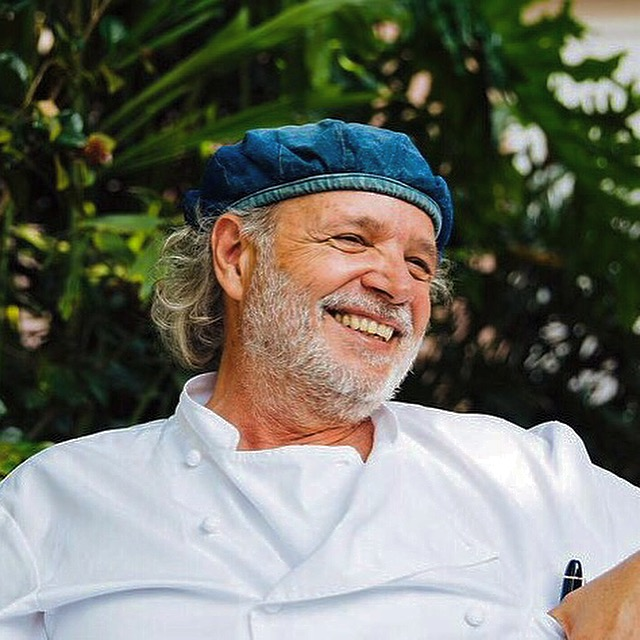
- Francis Mallmann
- Born: Francisco José Mallmann; January 14, 1956 (age 70); Acassuso, Argentina
- Spouse(s): Karina Badaracco; Malena Kelsey; Marina Achával; Vanina Chimeno (desde 2016)
- Children: Alexia, Allegra, Francisco, Ámbar Rosa, Andino, Heloisa, Alba
- Parent(s): Marisa Arienza; Carlos Mallmann
- Culinary career
- Cooking style: Argentine
- Current restaurants
- 1884, Mendoza; Ramos Generales at Kaikén Winery, Vistalba, Luján de Cuyo, Mendoza; Patagonia Sur, Buenos Aires; El Garzon, Uruguay; Siete Fuegos, Mendoza; Los Fuegos by Francis Mallmann, Miami; Fuegos de Apalta, Chile; Restaurant Francis Mallmann, France
- Television show
- Chef's Table

Francis Mallmann (born January 14, 1956) is an Argentine celebrity chef, author, and restaurateur who specializes in Argentine cuisine, and especially in Patagonian cuisine with a focus on various Patagonian methods of barbecuing food. Described as "South America's most popular chef," he has been featured on numerous international television programmes, as well as on the Netflix original series Chef's Table.

== Early life and education ==
Mallmann was born in Acassuso, Buenos Aires Province in 1956, one of six children of the Argentine physicist Carlos Mallmann and his Uruguayan wife Marisa (née Arienza). In 1958, the family moved to Patagonia when Carlos was hired to lead the Balseiro Institute in Bariloche, Río Negro Province. It was there that the younger Mallmann started working as a cook on a boat for tourists on Lake Nahuel Huapi in 1970.

== Career ==
At the age of 19, Mallmann began managing a restaurant with a partner. Then, at the age of 20, he travelled to Paris, where he spent over two years learning alongside Alain Chapel and other reputable chefs.

After returning to Argentina, Mallmann spent several years driving the kitchen of a restaurant. In 1983, he decided to open his own restaurant on Honduras street in Palermo. It was open only at night and behind closed doors. Mallmann worked as a cooking teacher. During this time, he wrote his first book, La Cocina al instante, which was published in 1984.

Mallmann began working in television in the early 1980s. Between 1987 and 1996, the program was recorded in his restaurant and, in the summer months, in Punta del Este, excluding 1992, when the program was recorded at the Seville Expo where Mallmann was representing Argentina. His visibility in television significantly influenced the reach and scope of his work.

Mallmann is Argentina's most acclaimed chef, known for his wilderness cooking and open-fire culinary techniques. He currently runs nine restaurants worldwide: Patagonia Sur (Argentina), Los Fuegos (Miami), Fuego de Apalta (Chile), 1884 Restaurant (Argentina), Garzón (Uruguay), Bodega Fuegos (Argentina), Orégano (Mendoza), Mallmann at Chateau La Coste (France). In 2025, he opened his first restaurant in New York City, "Boca" in the Faena Hotel at 500 West 18th Street.

== Personal life ==
Mallmann has Argentinian and Uruguayan double nationality. In 2016, he married Vanina Chimeno, with whom he has two daughters. Mallmann has five other children from previous marriages.
