= Șipca =

Şipca may rever to several places in Moldova:

- Şipca, a commune in Șoldănești District
- Şipca, a commune in Transnistria
