= Carlos Mallmann =

Argentine physicist (1928–2020)

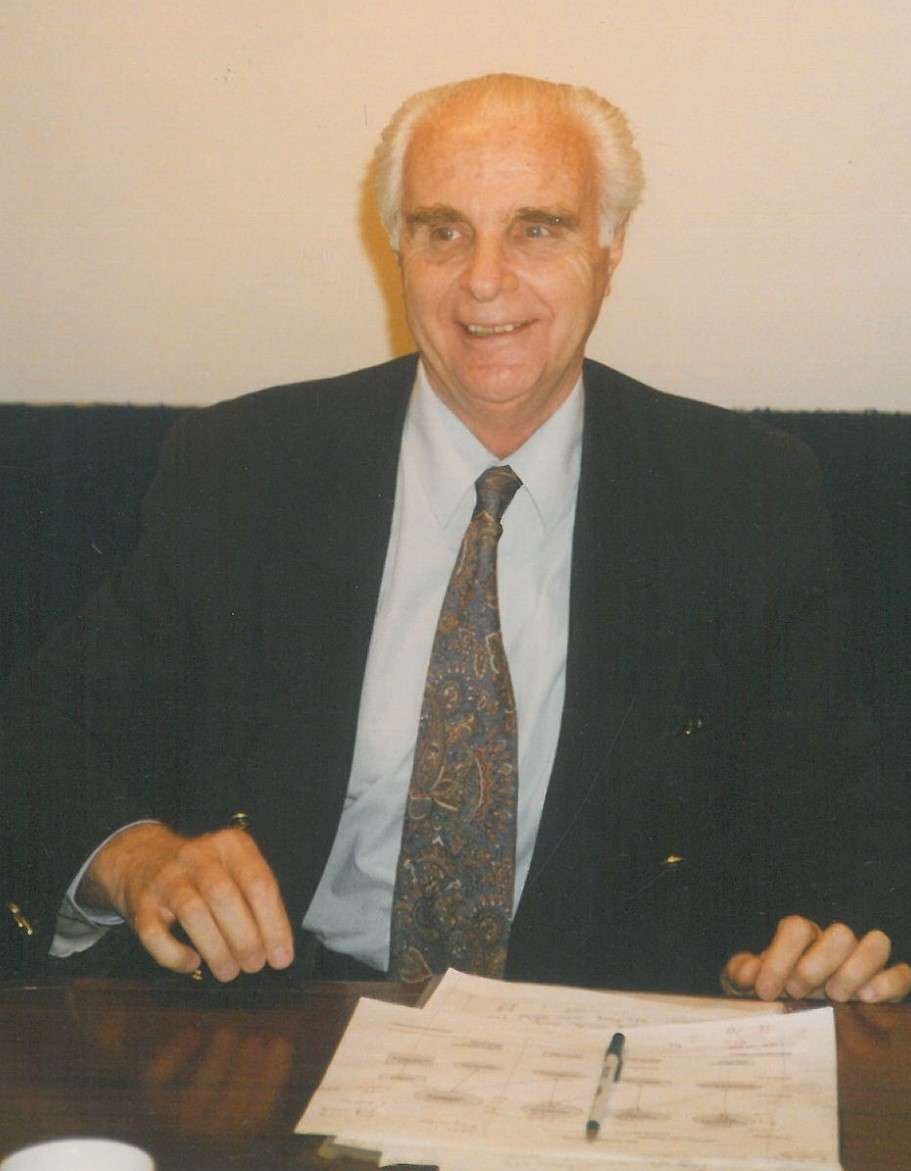
- Born: December 24, 1928; Buenos Aires, Argentina
- Died: May 2020 (aged 91–92)
- Spouse: Marisa Arienza
- Children: 6, including Francis

Carlos Alberto Mallmann (December 24, 1928 – May 2020) was an Argentine mathematical physicist, professor and researcher, considered one of the pioneers of physics and nuclear energy in Argentina.

The CTS Observatory of the Organization of Ibero-American States has stated that Carlos Mallmann was “one of the protagonists in the history of science and technology in Argentina and Latin America (...) He embodied the concepts, values, vocation and was an example of a true guardian of Argentine and Latin American science”.

== Biography ==
Carlos Alberto Mallmann was born on December 24, 1928, in Buenos Aires, the son of Arturo José Mallmann and Elsa Dreher.

In 1954 he obtained his doctorate in Physics-Mathematics at the University of Buenos Aires, with his thesis of "Kofoed-Hansen Type Beta Spectroscopes: Electronic Optics". He then completed postgraduate studies in the Netherlands with the support of the National Atomic Energy Commission (CNEA) and also at the Argonne National Laboratory of the United States Atomic Commission ( Chicago, United States) where he was able to share the results of his research with Nobel laureate Niels Bohr, who was working in the same laboratory (1958).

From 1958 to 1961 he was Director of Research for the CNEA, and from 1962 to 1966 Director of the Bariloche Atomic Center and the Balseiro Institute in Argentina. In turn, he was professor of the Physics Department of the Faculty of Exact and Natural Sciences of the University of Buenos Aires and of the National University of Cuyo, and made important contributions in low energy nuclear physics.

In 1962 he was appointed Director of the Centro Atómico Bariloche and the Instituto Balseiro, carrying out pioneering studies of physics and nuclear energy in Argentina. In 1963, the Bariloche Foundation was inspired by his proposals to address the promotion and transversal development of the arts and sciences, with a focus on Human development. The Foundation was created with six departments: Biology, Social Sciences, Mathematics, Natural Resources and Energy, Extension and services, and music. The Camerata Bariloche symbolizes the artistic milestone of the Foundation. Between 1967 and 1985 he was the executive president of the Foundation, and during that time he was between 1973 and 1984 Program Director of the United Nations University in Tokyo, and between 1972 and 1985 of the Wissenschaft Zentrum in Berlin.

He considered art and science as two sides of the same coin: creativity. During his years at the Bariloche Foundation, he began doing research in the field of science and technology policy, studies of quality of life, system of needs, human development, alternative models of development, and long-term societal dynamics.

He has been a key figure of thought to start the realization of the Latin American World Model, who presented his results in 1975, proposing an international alternative to the neo-Malthusian model of The Limits to Growth through world development, and solidarity between countries. The model was pioneer, and contributed to the understanding of the concept of unmet basic needs, which was later adopted by the United Nations as a main criterion of evaluation of human development. Mallmann died in May 2020.

== Personal life ==
The chef Francis Mallmann is his son.

== Publications ==
- 1984: El desarrollo humano en la sociedad contemporánea.
- 1986: Human development in its social context : a collective exploration (1986) by Carlos A Mallmann; Oscar Nudler; Telma Barreiro; United Nations University.; et al. London: Hodder and Stoughton in association with the United Nations University
- 1994: C. A. Mallmann, ¿Qué Metas para la ‘Segunda’ Argentina? 1995–2070, Buenos Aires: A-Z Edotira
- 1994: C. Mallmann, “Basic Needs” in Morales, P. (coord), Indigenous people, human rights and global interdependence, Tilburg: ICPHA (Spanish version: Mexico: FCE)
- 1998: C. A. Mallmann and G.A. Lemarchand, Generational Explanation of Long-Term ‘Billow Like’ Dynamics of Societal Processes, Technological Forecasting and Social Change, 59. 1-30 (1998)
- 2008: C. Mallmann, “Propuesta de vectores de mediano y largo plazo para la Argentina” at Revista Electrónica del Instituto de Investigaciones "Ambrosio L. Gioja" – II year, Number 2, Fall 2008

== See also ==
- Balseiro Institute
- National Atomic Energy Commission
- Latin American World Model
- Nuclear energy in Argentina
- INVAP
