= Ronald Richter =

Argentine Huemul Project scientist (1909–1991)

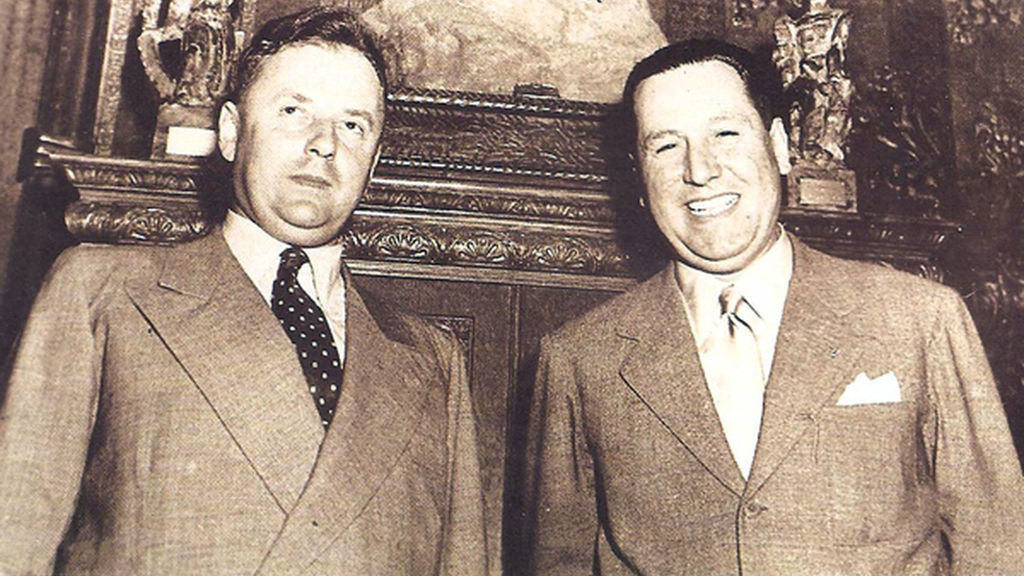
Ronald Richter (left) with Juan Domingo Perón (right).

Ronald Richter (21 February 1909 – 25 September 1991) was an Austrian-born German scientist, later also an Argentine citizen, who became infamous in connection with the Argentine Huemul Project and the National Atomic Energy Commission (CNEA). The project was intended to generate energy from controlled nuclear fusion in the 1950s, during the presidency of Juan Perón. According to Perón’s 1951 announcement, Richter's project would deliver cheap energy in containers of half-liter and liter size. (Note: Gambini (1999, Vol. 1, p. 398): "While in a state of delirious enthusiasm [Perón] said [just] anything, recalled Richter, and ventured to prognosticate that I would obtain for him bottled electric energy. As a consequence of those exaggerations the plan to expand the CADE [main source of electric power for the greater Buenos Aires] was dropped, giving rise to an energy setback." Gambini (1999, Vol. 1, p. 401): "[From t]he writer Tomás Eloy Martínez (1996, p. 182): ...Perón was clumsy in announcing the false finding in a resounding manner, assuring that from that moment Argentina would sell nuclear energy for domestic use in bottles of one litre and half a litre. Naturally, this caused what in Argentina has been known [since then as] a 'historical embarrassment.'" NOTE: Eloy Martinez cites the origin of his quotation to be Confalonieri (1956, p. 214) who took it from its original source: the newspaper Clarin, Buenos Aires, issue of 7 October 1955) Skepticism arose to Richter’s claims both internally and within Argentina. An independent review panel organized by Perón determined Richter’s research was spurious.

== Nationality ==
Richter was born in Falkenau an der Eger (in Czech Falknov nad Ohří renamed Sokolov in 1948), Bohemia (now Czech Republic) while it was part of the Austrian empire. Richter was of German origin. He was naturalized as an Argentine citizen in the early 1950s; President of Argentina Juan Perón overrode Argentine law to enable this.

== Education ==
Richter attended the German University of Prague, graduating in 1935. Sources provide variant narratives about his studies as a doctoral candidate.

According to Gambini, Richter was awarded a doctorate in natural sciences in 1955. However, another source claims that he was not awarded a doctoral degree because he had misinterpreted his research results. He had concluded that he had discovered delta rays being emitted by the earth, but in fact he had been detecting X-rays scattered by the ground.

According to his recollection, Santos Mayo had personally heard Richard Gans say:

Richter proposed a thesis, at the German University of Prague, to detect "delta rays" emitted from Earth. Professor Heinrich Rausch von Traubenberg did not agree with the project. The "young genius" went to work somewhere else and graduated in a different field.

— Santos Mayo, Letter to Physics Today, March 2004

Kurt Sitte's recollections of Richter's research under Prof. Furth differed. He recalled:

...when I was Prof. Furth's assistant in the Department of Experimental Physics [of Prague University], [Richter] came to interest us in a fantastic project. He had read (not in a scientific journal, of course) about the discovery of a mysterious radiation, the "earth rays", that radiated from the interior of the Earth and caused a huge type of fabulous effects. These were what he wanted to research. He was very excited with the idea, and it was very difficult to convince him (if we really did) that the "evidence" cited was spurious. His thesis was not published.

— Kurt Sitte, Mariscotti, 1985, quoting Alemann, 1955

== Career ==
=== Europe ===
Richter worked in Germany, England and France.

In preparing his dissertation for a doctorate from the University of Prague, Richter worked at Falkenau Chemiewerke in his home town of Falkenau an der Eger (now known as Sokolov) in the Czech Republic. There he went to work with electric arc furnaces looking to develop accurate methods for measurement and control of temperatures. Richter discovered that the injection of heavy hydrogen (deuterium) caused a nuclear reaction which he could measure and gauge with Geiger counters.

Following the end of World War II, his only known jobs were a six-month stint working on explosives and a few commercial contracts. He met the aeronautical engineer Kurt Tank in London; Tank later emigrated to Argentina, hired by Perón's government under the pseudonym of Pedro Matthies.

=== Argentina ===
On the recommendation of Kurt Tank in 1947, Richter was invited to Argentina to develop a nuclear program for General Juan Perón. He learned that a German fusion reactor had been smuggled to Argentina and Perón desperately needed an expert able to bring the device back to life. Richter brought knowledge of German particle accelerator technology and was received by the German industrialist and Nazi spy August Siebrecht. Siebrecht took Richter to Córdoba, where Tank was developing aircraft. Tank was interested in Richter's proposal to use nuclear energy for aircraft propulsion. Richter continued to address Tank as Prof. Dr. Pedro Matthies in his correspondence about the Huemul Project.

In 1949 Perón hired Richter, who had convinced him that he could produce controlled nuclear fusion using cheap materials in a process that could supply enormous quantities of cheap energy, a program that eventually became known as the Huemul Project. Perón's reasons for backing Richter were in line with the ideology of modernization underlying his concept of the "New Argentina"; he was not interested in the military applications of atomic energy, but saw it as a way to expand iron and steel production.

Perón believed that any project undertaken by a Nazi German scientist was bound to be successful. Due to his political disagreements with Argentine scientists of stature, such as Enrique Gaviola, Perón was reluctant to seek their advice on Richter's proposal, and he gave Richter carte blanche and appointed him as his personal representative in the Bariloche area. The total cost of the project was estimated at US$300 million (2003 value).

In 1951 Richter announced that he had achieved controlled nuclear fusion under laboratory conditions, a claim later proven false: it transpired that Richer had simply exploded hydrogen in an electric arc.

After it became evident that Richter's project was spurious, Perón appointed a technical committee which included José Balseiro, a former faculty member at the La Plata Institute of Physics, which was to report directly to him whether Richter's project should be discontinued. The committee analyzed Richter's work and concluded that the actual temperature reached in his experiments was far too low to produce a true thermonuclear reaction. They reported their findings to Perón in September 1952; soon after that project was terminated.

After the termination of the project, Richter appears to have spent periods of time abroad, including some time in Libya. Eventually he returned to Argentina, where he died in 1991; a short announcement of his death appeared in an obituary published by Microsemanario.

=== Project Huemul: reactions and aftermath ===
On 24 March 1951 Perón announced to the international press "Argentina Produces Atomic Energy", and later decorated Richter with the Peronista Medal. Following international publicity and claims, scientists in Britain were hesitant to accept the claims of the unknown Richter without corroboration. In the US, the press discounted reports of Richter's work, but secretly the government started funding two projects, Sherwood and Matterhorn. An intelligence assessment by the US, later declassified, stated that he could possibly be a "mad genius [...], thinking in the year 1970." However, it soon became evident that the claims were spurious, and interest dried up. After Perón was deposed, the new government investigated Richter regarding 1,000 million Argentine pesos (about £25 million at the time) allocated to the project and unaccounted for, and arrested him. Nothing further was heard about him. Secret British government documents declassified under the 30-year rule in 1983 report that Perón had contemplated invading the Falkland Islands in 1951, possibly due to his confidence that Argentina would be the first country to exploit atomic energy for industrial purposes.

== Biographical publications ==
The following are quotations from books and articles published by journalists, biographers, physicists, and historians, with sources below:

From Eva Perón (Alicia Dujovne Ortiz, 1996):

This German "scientist" had succeeded in convincing Perón that he was capable of producing atomic energy. Perón had an atomic plant built for him…. The country lacked cement to build homes, yet tons of mortar were shuttled to Huemul. With his raincoat and his tousled hair, Richter looked like a mad scientist, and he made everyone laugh – except Perón, who for once was very serious. Evita would say, "The General is very naive." Needless to say, nothing came of this endeavor.

— Dujovne Ortiz, 1996

From Juan G. Roederer (2003):

That fusion energy project, conceived and directed by Austrian physicist and con artist Ronald Richter, was being developed in absolute secrecy on Isla Huemul...some high-level members of Perón's entourage had serious doubts about Richter's sincerity and the soundness of his ideas. The doubters discreetly sought the advice of scientists from advanced countries – a risky move because of Perón's initial blind support of Richter.... Perón startled the world with his announcement that "the Argentine scientist Richter" – who couldn't speak a word of Spanish – had achieved the controlled release of nuclear-fusion energy. Not one real Argentine physicist was participating in the Huemul project, and not one in the entire country believed in the truth of Perón's announcement.

— Juan G. Roederer, 2003

== Richter, The Opera: A Musical Documentary ==
Ronald Richter inspired an opera, Richter: Ópera Documental de Cámara, by Mario Lorenzo and Esteban Buch, with references to the spectacular experiments. It has been performed both in Argentina (Teatro Colón) and in France (Théâtre Paris-Villette).

The narrative unfolds in a lyrical atmosphere shaped by the constant Patagonian winds of the Roaring Forties and the repeated sound of waves breaking along the island’s shores, until the tranquility is disrupted by German voices and sudden explosive sounds.

- Summary and critique. Casullo, Eduardo. La Aventura de la Isla de la Mula: Richter.
- Spectacles. Richter: Opéra documentaire de Mario Lorenzo.
