= Guido Beck =

Argentine physicist (1903–1988)

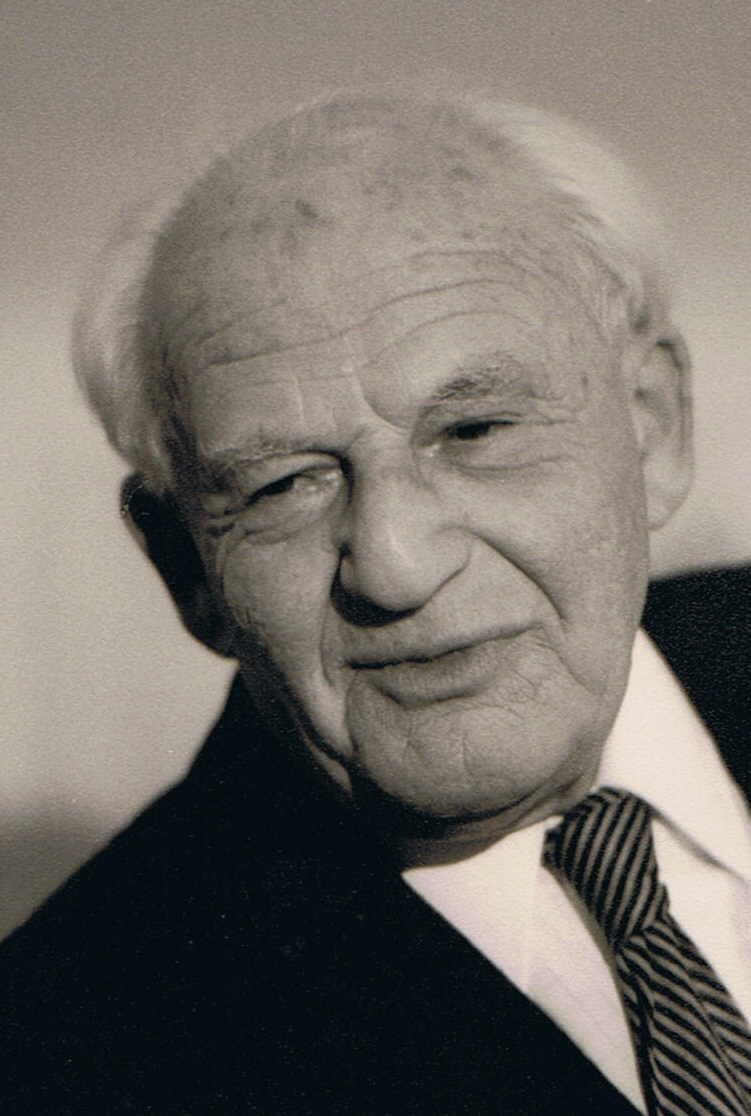
- Guido Beck 1971–72
- Born: August 29, 1903; Liberec, Austria-Hungary
- Died: October 21, 1988 (aged 85); Rio de Janeiro, Brazil
- Education: University of Vienna
- Known for: Work on gravitational waves Contributions to beta decay
- Scientific career
- Fields: Theoretical physics
- Workplaces: University of Odessa, University of Coimbra, University of Porto, Instituto Balseiro, Centro Brasileiro de Pesquisas Físicas
- Doctoral advisor: Hans Thirring
- Doctoral students: José Antonio Balseiro; Mario Bunge

Guido Beck (29 August 1903 – 21 October 1988) was an Argentine physicist of German Bohemian origin, who was born in Liberec and died in Rio de Janeiro. He discovered all cylindrically symmetric nonrotating vacuum solutions in general relativity, which is the first instance of exactly solved gravitational waves.

== Biography ==
Beck studied physics in Vienna and received his doctorate in 1925, under Hans Thirring. He worked in Leipzig in 1928 as an assistant to Werner Heisenberg. A combination of the troubled political climate of Europe in the 1930s, his own restlessness, and the Nazi persecutions in Germany, made the Jewish-born Beck a traveler in those years. Until 1935 he worked in Cambridge with Ernest Rutherford, Copenhagen, Prague, United States and Japan.

In 1935, Beck was invited to work in the Soviet Union by Head of the Institute of Physics, Odessa University Yelpidifor Anempodistovich Kirillov. At the Odessa University Beck was head of the Department of Theoretical Physics and gave a course of theoretical physics in German; his lectures were simultaneously translated into Ukrainian by his assistant Yu.G. Vekshtein. In 1936–1937 Beck was head of the department of theoretical mechanics at the Institute of Water Transport Engineers in Odessa. Four of his Odessa students – VV Malyarov, MM Alperin, GV Skrotskii and PE Nemirovsky – became professors in Odessa and Moscow.

In 1937, Guido Beck moved to France, where he was imprisoned when World War II broke out. In 1941, he fled to Portugal. From 1942 to 1943 he was a guest professor at the University of Coimbra and the University of Oporto. In 1943 he emigrated to Argentina.

In Argentina, he was instrumental in training several Argentine physicists, including José Antonio Balseiro, and had a profound impact in developing physics in Argentina. He moved once more, this time to Brazil, in 1951, where his influence in developing physics was also great.

He was called back to Argentina in 1962, after the death of Balseiro, and continued his work at the Instituto Balseiro.

In 1975, he returned to Brazil, and worked in the Centro Brasileiro de Pesquisas Físicas (CBPF).

Apart from his influence as a teacher in South America he contributed to a theory of beta-decay, which was later superseded by a more complete theory by Fermi. He was a friend of the famous writer Ernesto Sabato.

He died in a car accident in Rio de Janeiro in 1988.

== Honours ==
- In 1977, he was given the doctoral degree of honour by the Darmstadt University of Technology, Germany for his exemplary activity as an academic teacher and his relentless efforts in establishing research institutions in physics.
