= Mario Bunge =

Argentine-Canadian philosopher (1919–2020)

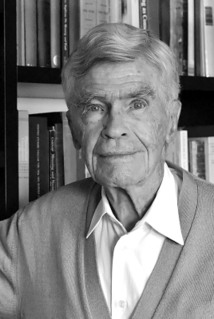
- Bunge in 2007
- Born: Mario Augusto Bunge; September 21, 1919; Florida Oeste, Buenos Aires, Argentina
- Died: February 24, 2020 (aged 100); Montreal, Quebec, Canada
- Spouse(s): Julia Delfina Molina y Vedia (m. 1940, divorced) Marta Cavallo (m. 1958)
- Children: 4

Education
- Education: National University of La Plata (PhD, 1952)
- Doctoral advisor: Guido Beck
- Other advisors: Teófilo Isnardi; Ernesto Sabato

Philosophical work
- Era: Contemporary philosophy
- Region: Western philosophy
- School: Analytic philosophy; scientific realism; emergentism
- Institutions: McGill University
- Main interests: Philosophy of science; philosophy of physics; pseudoscience
- Notable ideas: Systemics; sociotechnology; exact philosophy

Mario Augusto Bunge (/ˈbʊŋɡeɪ/ BUUNG-gay; Spanish: [ˈmaɾjo ˈβuŋxe]; September 21, 1919 – February 24, 2020) was an Argentine-Canadian philosopher and physicist. His philosophical writings combined scientific realism, systemism, materialism, emergentism, and other principles.

He was an advocate of "exact philosophy" and a critic of existentialist, hermeneutical, phenomenological philosophy, and postmodernism. He was popularly known for his opinions against pseudoscience.

== Early and personal life ==
Bunge was born on September 21, 1919, in Florida Oeste, Buenos Aires. His mother, Marie Herminie Müser, was a German nurse who left Germany just before the beginning of World War I. His father, Augusto Bunge, also of some German descent, was an Argentine physician and socialist legislator. Mario, who was the couple's only child, was raised without any religious education, and enjoyed a happy and stimulating childhood in the outskirts of Buenos Aires.

Bunge had four children: Carlos Federico and Mario Augusto Julio, with ex-wife Julia Delfina Molina y Vedia, and Eric R. and Silvia A., with his wife of over 60 years, the Argentine mathematician Marta Cavallo. Mario lived with Cavallo in Montreal from 1966 until his death, with one-year sabbaticals in other countries.

== Studies and career ==
Bunge began his studies at the National University of La Plata, graduating with a PhD in physico-mathematical sciences in 1952. He was professor of theoretical physics and philosophy, 1956–1966, first at La Plata then at University of Buenos Aires. His international debut was at the 1956 Inter-American Philosophical Congress in Santiago, Chile. He was particularly noticed there by Willard Van Orman Quine, who called Bunge the star of the congress. He was, until his retirement at age 90, the Frothingham Professor of Logic and Metaphysics at McGill University in Montreal, where he had been since 1966.

In a review of Bunge's 2016 memoirs, Between Two Worlds: Memoirs of a Philosopher-Scientist, James Alcock saw in Bunge "a man of exceedingly high confidence who has lived his life guided by strong principles about truth, science, and justice" and one who is "[impatient] with muddy thinking".

He became a centenarian in September 2019. A Festschrift was published to mark the occasion, with essays by an international collection of scholars. He died in Montreal, Canada, on February 24, 2020, at the age of 100.

== Political views ==
Bunge defined himself as a left-wing liberal and democratic socialist, in the tradition of John Stuart Mill and José Ingenieros. He was a supporter of the Campaign for the Establishment of a United Nations Parliamentary Assembly, an organisation which advocates for democratic reform in the United Nations, and the creation of a more accountable international political system.

== Work ==
=== Philosophy ===
Bunge was a prolific intellectual, having written more than 400 papers and 80 books, notably his monumental Treatise on Basic Philosophy in eight volumes (1974–1989), a comprehensive and rigorous study of those philosophical aspects Bunge takes to be the core of modern philosophy: semantics, ontology, epistemology, philosophy of science and ethics. In his Treatise, Bunge developed a comprehensive scientific outlook which he then applied to the various natural and social sciences.

His work is based on global systemism, emergentism, rationalism, scientific realism, materialism and consequentialism. Bunge repeatedly and explicitly denied being a logical positivist, and wrote on metaphysics.

A variety of scientists and philosophers influenced his thought. Among those thinkers, Bunge explicitly acknowledged the direct influence of his own father, the Argentine physician Augusto Bunge, the Czech physicist Guido Beck, the Argentine mathematician Alberto González Domínguez, the Argentine mathematician, physicist and computer scientist Manuel Sadosky, the Italian sociologist and psychologist Gino Germani, the American sociologist Robert King Merton, and the French-Polish epistemologist Émile Meyerson.

Among many frameworks that Bunge proposed was a five-stage model of the maturation of science from immature prescience to mature tetartoscience: see Protoscience § Developmental stages of science.

Popularly, he is known for his remarks considering psychoanalysis as an example of pseudoscience. He was critical of the ideas of well known scientists and philosophers such as Karl Popper, Richard Dawkins, Stephen Jay Gould, and Daniel Dennett.

Bunge appreciated some aspects of Popper's critical rationalism but found it insufficient as a comprehensive philosophy of science, and instead formulated his own account of scientific realism. John R. Wettersen, who defined "critical rationalism" more broadly than Popper's work, called Bunge's theory of science "a version of critical rationalism".

==== Philosophy of social sciences ====
Bunge addressed issues of theory and method in the social sciences starting with his Treatise on Basic Philosophy and later in his career wrote two books entirely focused on the social sciences: Finding Philosophy in Social Science (1996) and Social Science under Debate: A Philosophical Perspective (1998). In these works he argued for an approach to the study of societies that he called systemism, an alternative to holism and individualism. He was an advocate for what he called mechanismic explanations and defended the view that social mechanisms are processes "in a concrete system, such that it is capable of bringing about or preventing some change in the system as a whole or in some of its subsystems".

== Awards ==
Bunge was the recipient of many awards throughout his career.

- Guggenheim Fellowship (1971)
- The Premio Príncipe de Asturias (Prince of Asturias Award) for Communication and Humanities (1982)
- Fellow of the American Association for the Advancement of Science (AAAS) (1984)
- Fellow of the Royal Society of Canada (1992)
- The Ludwig von Bertalanffy Award in Complexity Thinking (2014)

Bunge was also distinguished with twenty-one honorary doctorates and four honorary professorships by universities from both the Americas and Europe. He is in the "Science Hall of Fame" featured in Science in 2011.

== Selected publications ==
- 1959. Causality: The Place of the Causal Principle in Modern Science. Cambridge: Harvard University Press. (Fourth edition, New Brunswick: Transaction Publishers, 2009.)
- 1960. La ciencia, su método y su filosofía. Buenos Aires: Eudeba. (In French: La science, sa méthode et sa philosophie. Paris: Vigdor, 2001, ISBN 2910243907.)
- 1962. Intuition and Science. Prentice-Hall. (In French: Intuition et raison. Paris: Vigdor, 2001, ISBN 2910243893.)
- 1963. The Myth of Simplicity: Problems of Scientific Philosophy. Englewood Cliffs, NJ: Prentice-Hall.
- 1967. Scientific Research: Strategy and Philosophy. Volume 1: The Search for System. Volume 2: The Search for Truth. Berlin, New York: Springer-Verlag. Revised and reprinted as Philosophy of Science, 2 Vols. New Brunswick, NJ: Transaction, 1998.
- 1967. Foundations of Physics. Berlin, Heidelberg, New York: Springer-Verlag.
- 1973. Method, Model, and Matter. Dordrecht: Reidel.
- 1973. Philosophy of Physics. Dordrecht: Reidel.
- 1977. "Emergence and the Mind", Neuroscience 2(4), 501–509.
- 1980. The Mind-Body Problem. Oxford: Pergamon.
- 1981. Scientific Materialism. Dordrecht: Reidel.
- 1983. "Demarcating Science from Pseudoscience", Fundamenta Scientiae 3: 369–388.
- 1984. "What is Pseudoscience?", The Skeptical Inquirer 9: 36–46.
- 1987. Philosophy of Psychology (with Rubén Ardila). New York: Springer.
- 1987. "Why Parapsychology Cannot Become a Science", Behavioral and Brain Sciences 10: 576–577.
- 1988. Ciencia y desarrollo. Buenos Aires: Siglo Veinte.
- 1974–89. Treatise on Basic Philosophy: 8 volumes in 9 parts:
  - I: Semantics I: Sense and Reference. Dordrecht: Reidel, 1974.
  - II: Semantics II: Interpretation and Truth. Dordrecht: Reidel, 1974.
  - III: Ontology I: The Furniture of the World. Dordrecht: Reidel, 1977.
  - IV: Ontology II: A World of Systems. Dordrecht: Reidel, 1979.
  - V: Epistemology and Methodology I: Exploring the World. Dordrecht: Reidel, 1983.
  - VI: Epistemology and Methodology II: Understanding the World. Dordrecht: Reidel, 1983.
  - VII: Epistemology and Methodology III: Philosophy of Science and Technology: Part I. Formal and Physical Sciences. Dordrecht: Reidel, 1985. Part II. Life Science, Social Science and Technology. Dordrecht: Reidel, 1985.
  - VIII: Ethics: the Good and the Right. Dordrecht: D. Reidel, 1989.
- 1996. Finding Philosophy in Social Science. New Haven: Yale University Press.
- 1996. "Is Religious Education Compatible with Science Education?" (with Martin Mahner), Science & Education 5(2), 101–123.
- 1997. Foundations of Biophilosophy (with Martin Mahner). New York: Springer.
- 1997. "Mechanism and Explanation", Philosophy of the Social Sciences 27(4), 410–465.
- 1998. Dictionary of Philosophy. Amherst, NY: Prometheus Books.
- 1998. Elogio de la curiosidad. Buenos Aires: Editorial Sudamericana.
- 1998. Social Science under Debate: A Philosophical Perspective. Toronto: University of Toronto Press.
- 1999. The Sociology–Philosophy Connection. New Brunswick, NJ: Transaction.
- 2001. Philosophy in Crisis: The Need for Reconstruction. Amherst, NY: Prometheus Books.
- 2001. Scientific Realism: Selected Essays of Mario Bunge. Edited by Martin Mahner. Amherst, NY: Prometheus Books.
- 2003. Emergence and Convergence: Qualitative Novelty and the Unity of Knowledge. Toronto: University of Toronto Press.
- 2004. "How Does It Work? The Search for Explanatory Mechanisms", Philosophy of the Social Sciences 34(2), 182–210.
- 2004. Über die Natur der Dinge. Materialismus und Wissenschaft (with Martin Mahner). Stuttgart: S. Hirzel Verlag.
- 2006. Chasing Reality: Strife over Realism. Toronto: University of Toronto Press.
- 2009. Political Philosophy: Fact, Fiction, and Vision. New Brunswick, NJ: Transaction.
- 2010. Matter and Mind: A Philosophical Inquiry. New York: Springer.
- 2012. Evaluating Philosophies. New York: Springer.
- 2012. "Does Quantum Physics Refute Realism, Materialism and Determinism?", Science & Education 21(10): 1601–1610.
- 2013. Medical Philosophy: Conceptual Issues in Medicine. New Jersey: World Scientific Publishing Company.
- 2016. Between Two Worlds: Memoirs of a Philosopher–Scientist. New York: Springer.
- 2017. Doing Science: In the Light of Philosophy. Singapore: World Scientific Publishing Company.
- 2018. From a Scientific Point of View: Reasoning and Evidence Beat Improvisation across Fields. Cambridge: Cambridge Scholars.

== See also ==
- Dialectic § Criticisms
- List of people from Montreal
- Scientism § Pro-scientism
