= Bariloche Atomic Centre =

Research and development centre of the Argentine National Atomic Energy Commission

Coordinates: 41.1202°S 71.414°W

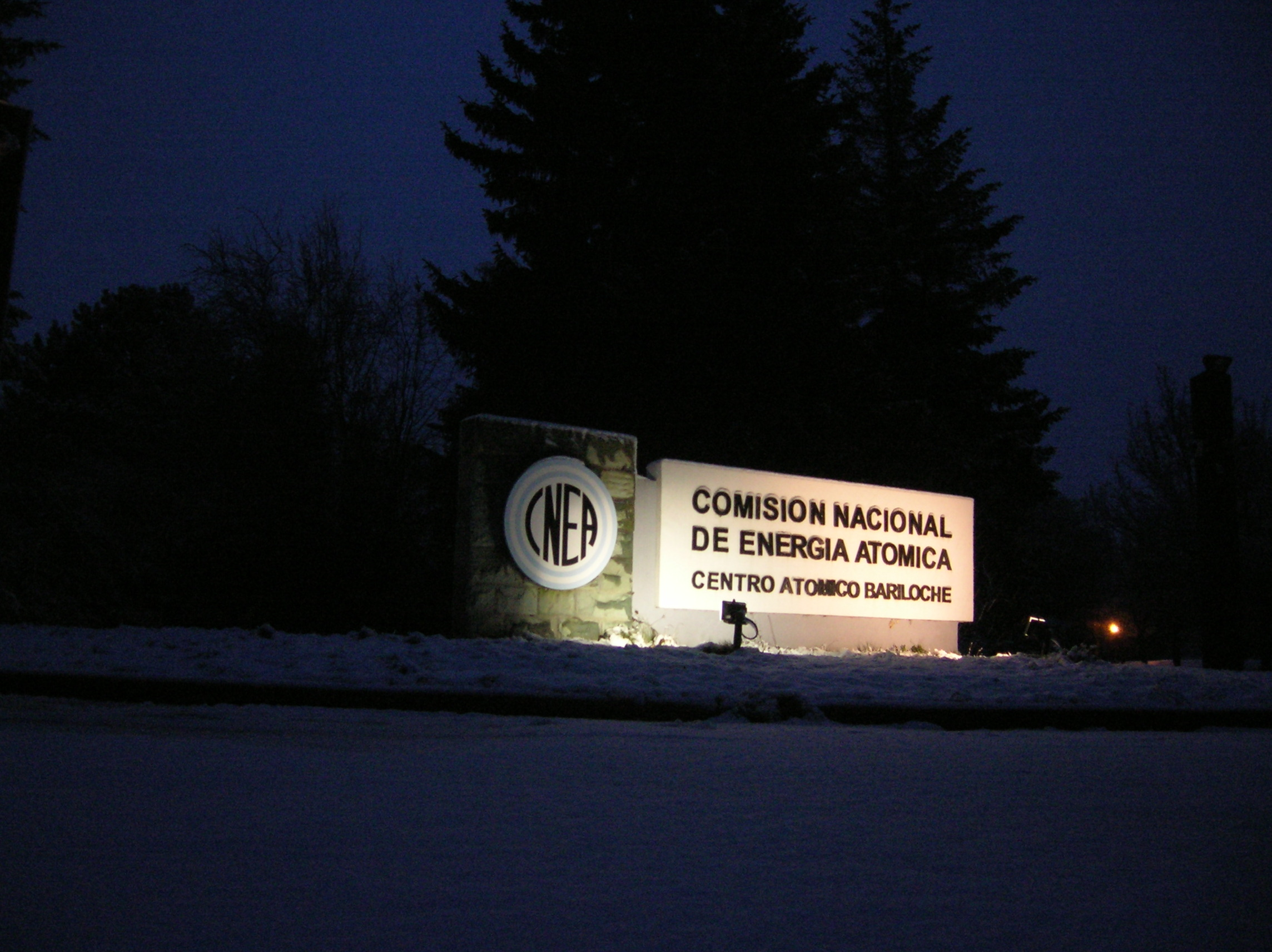

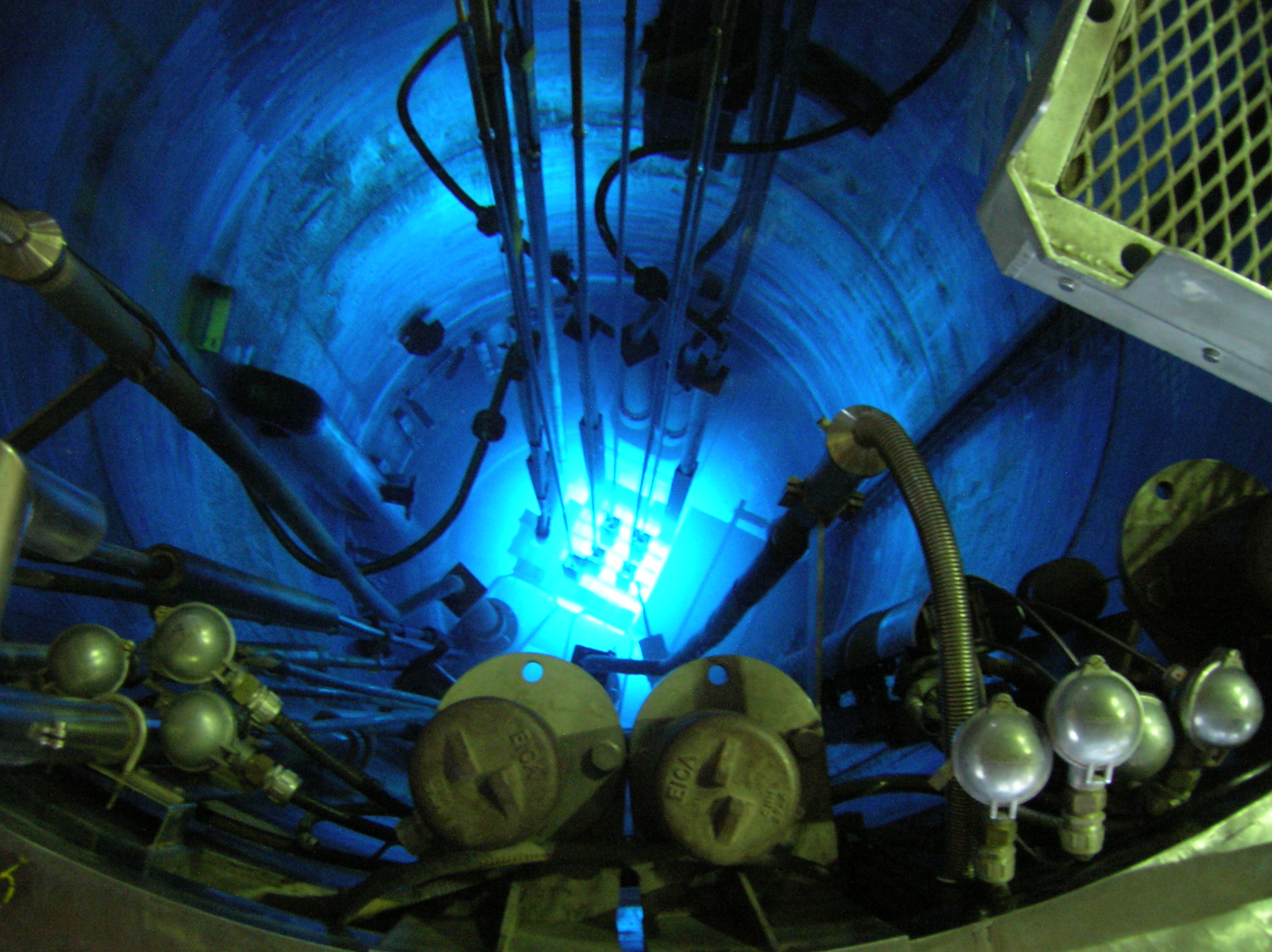
RA-6 reactor core, pale blue light product of Cherenkov effect

The Bariloche Atomic Centre (Spanish: Centro Atómico Bariloche) is one of the research and development centres of the Argentine National Atomic Energy Commission. As its name implies, it is located in the city of San Carlos de Bariloche. Bariloche Atomic Centre is responsible for research in physics and nuclear engineering. It also hosts the Balseiro Institute, a collaboration between National University of Cuyo and the National Atomic Energy Commission. The Bariloche Atomic Centre opened in 1955 with its first director, José Antonio Balseiro. The RA-6 reactor started operations in 1982.

== Activity ==
The centre is devoted to basic and applied physics research as well as Nuclear and Mechanical Engineering.

Basic research is focused on deepening understanding of nuclear energy. Applied sciences have provided support for both state- and privately owned companies. The main areas of research include: materials, neutrons, thermodynamics and theoretical physics.

Nuclear Engineering at the Centre is aimed at further developing Argentina's atomic technology. Most of the research is done taking advantage of RA-6, a 1 MW experimental reactor. Experiments done with the RA-6 include irradiation and radioactive activation of several materials.

Some research groups also focus on refining reactor calculations and performance measurements and designing mechanical devices for those tasks.

Various companies have sprung out of the Bariloche Atomic Center, such as INVAP and ALTEC.
