= Marta Bunge =

Argentine-Canadian mathematician (1938–2022)

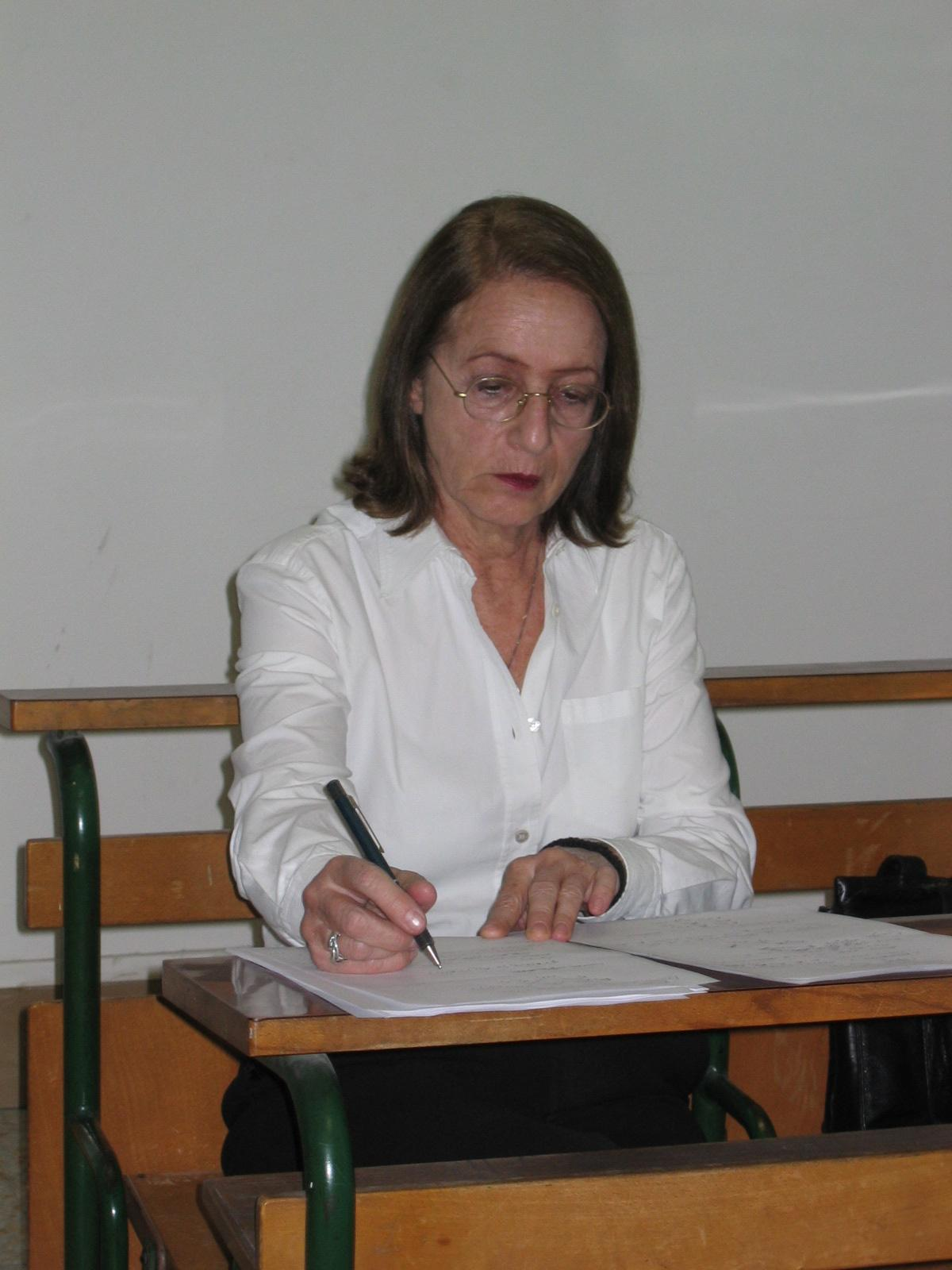
- Bunge at Ramifications of Category Theory, Florence, November 2003
- Born: Marta Cavallo; October 31, 1938; Buenos Aires, Argentina
- Died: October 25, 2022 (aged 83); Brooklyn, New York, U.S.
- Education: University of Pennsylvania
- Spouse: Mario Bunge (m. 1958; died 2020)
- Children: 2
- Scientific career
- Fields: Category theory
- Workplaces: McGill University
- Thesis: Categories of Set Valued Functors (1966)
- Doctoral advisor: Peter J. Freyd; William Lawvere

Marta Cavallo Bunge (née Cavallo; 31 October 1938 – 25 October 2022) was an Argentine-Canadian mathematician specializing in category theory, and known for her work on synthetic calculus of variations and synthetic differential topology. She was a professor emeritus at McGill University.

== Early life and career ==
Bunge was a student at a teacher's college in Buenos Aires, the daughter of Ricardo and María Teresa Cavallo. She met Argentine philosopher Mario Bunge while auditing one of his courses, and they eloped in late 1958 (as his second marriage).

Bunge earned her Ph.D. from the University of Pennsylvania in 1966. Her dissertation, Categories of Set Valued Functors, was jointly supervised by Peter J. Freyd and William Lawvere. When she was offered a postdoctoral research position at McGill in 1966, her husband followed her there, and they remained in Canada afterwards. She became an assistant professor at McGill in 1969, was promoted to full professor in 1985, and retired as a professor emeritus in 2003.

== Books ==
With her doctoral student Jonathon Funk, Bunge is the co-author of Singular Coverings of Toposes (Lecture Notes in Mathematics 1890, Springer, 2006). With Felipe Gago and Ana María San Luis, Bunge is the co-author of Synthetic Differential Topology (London Mathematical Society Lecture Note Series 448, Cambridge University Press, 2018).
