= Georgii Skrotskii =

Russian physicist (1915–1992)

George V. Skrotskii (January 11, 1915 – July 13, 1992) was a Russian physicist.

Skrotskii realized that electromagnetic field equations in a curved spacetime can be written in a non-covariant form formally equivalent to Maxwell's equations in a macroscopic medium in flat spacetime.
