= Huemul Island =

Island in Nahuel Huapi Lake, Argentina

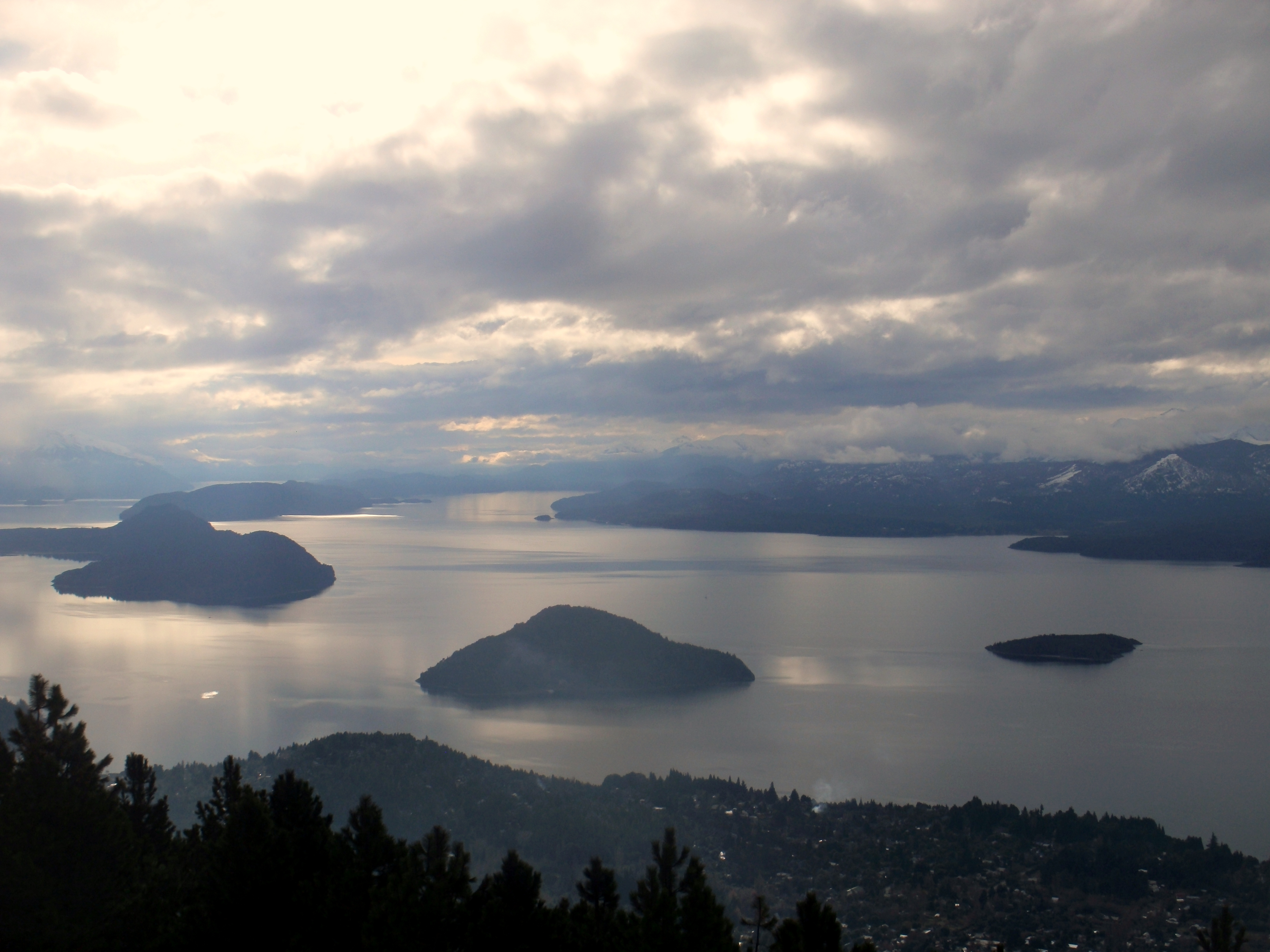
View of Huemul Island in the center of the lake with the adjacent Gallinas islet

Huemul Island (Spanish: Isla Huemul) is an island in the Nahuel Huapi Lake, off the shore of San Carlos de Bariloche, a city in the province of Río Negro, Argentina, at 41°06′23″S 71°23′42″W. It derives its name from the Mapuche chief Güemul, whose tribe inhabited the area. Considered a historical and ecological tourist attraction, it has recently been conceded to the municipality of Bariloche after licitations with the government of Río Negro.

== See also ==
- Huemul Project, an Argentine fusion power research program
