= José Antonio Balseiro =

Argentine physicist (1919–1962)

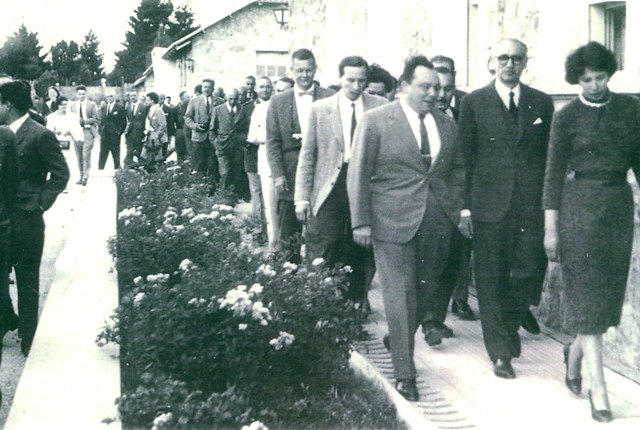
Picture of Jose A. Balseiro con Frondizi, Argentina 1960

José Antonio Balseiro (March 29, 1919 in Córdoba – March 26, 1962 in Bariloche) was an Argentine physicist.

Balseiro studied at the Universidad Nacional de Córdoba in his home city, before moving to La Plata to study and research, obtaining a doctorate in physics at the Universidad Nacional de La Plata. His doctoral dissertation was directed by Dr. Guido Beck, an Austrian physicist who arrived as a refugee in 1943. In 1950 he received a scholarship granted by the British Council. Due to the limited funds provided by the scholarship, his wife and daughter remained in Argentina. Balseiro did his post-doctoral research at the University of Manchester, in the group directed by Léon Rosenfeld. His father was Galician and his mother was French.

The Argentine government requested that he return to Argentina in 1952, a few months before the expiration of his scholarship, to serve in the scientific review panel of the Huemul Project, a study on nuclear fusion conducted by Ronald Richter. Balseiro's report and those of other members of the panel finally convinced the government that the Huemul Project had no scientific merit. Based on this, and reports from a second review panel (composed of physicists Richard Gans and Antonio Rodríguez), the Huemul Project was abandoned.

Afterwards, Balseiro remained in Argentina where he was appointed director of the physics department of the Facultad de Ciencias Exactas y Naturales of the Universidad de Buenos Aires in 1952.

In 1955, using part of the old installations of the Huemul Project, the National Atomic Energy Commission created the Instituto de Física de Bariloche. Balseiro played an important role in this decision and served as the first director of the new institution. Upon his untimely death from leukemia in 1962, the institute was renamed Instituto Balseiro. In 2005 the Instituto Balseiro celebrated 50 years of existence, having grown to become one of the country's leading centers for research in new technology, physics, and nuclear engineering.
