= Șipca, Șoldănești =

Șipca
- Village
- Location within Moldova
- Coordinates: 47.8481°N 28.8061°E
- Country: Moldova
- District: Șoldănești District

Government
  - Mayor: Ion Bulat (PDM)

Population (2014 census)
  - Total: 692
- Time zone: UTC+2 (EET)
  - Summer (DST): UTC+3 (EEST)

Șipca is a village in Șoldănești District, Moldova.
