= National University of Cuyo =

University in Argentina

- Universidad Nacional de Cuyo
- Motto: In spiritus remigio vita (Latin)
- Motto in English: Life is in the wingbeat of the spirit
- Type: Public
- Established: 1939; 87 years ago
- Rector: Cdora. Esther Sánchez
- Vice-rector: Mgtr. Gabriel Fidel
- Academic staff: 4,071
- Students: 44,160 (2016)
- Location: Mendoza, Mendoza Province, Argentina; 32.880650°S 68.878306°W
- Colors: Green, white and blue
- Website: www.uncu.edu.ar

The National University of Cuyo (Spanish: Universidad Nacional de Cuyo, UNCuyo) is the largest center of higher education in the province of Mendoza, Argentina.

As of 2005, the university had 12 academic schools in the city of Mendoza and a delegation in the city of San Rafael (province of Mendoza), in addition to the Balseiro Institute, which is the most developed institute of Physics research in Argentina, located in the city of San Carlos de Bariloche (province of Río Negro). It includes the University Technological Institute which offers technical education in four other cities in Mendoza province. Moreover, UNCuyo is also devoted to improving education due to having 7 other buildings working as High Schools:

- C.U.C. (Colegio Universitario Central "Gral. Jose de San Martin")
- Escuela de Comercio Martín Zapata
- Liceo Agrícola Domingo Faustino Sarmiento
- Escuela del Magisterio
- Escuela de Agricultura
- D.A.D (Departamento de Aplicación Docente)
- Escuela Carmen Vera Arenas

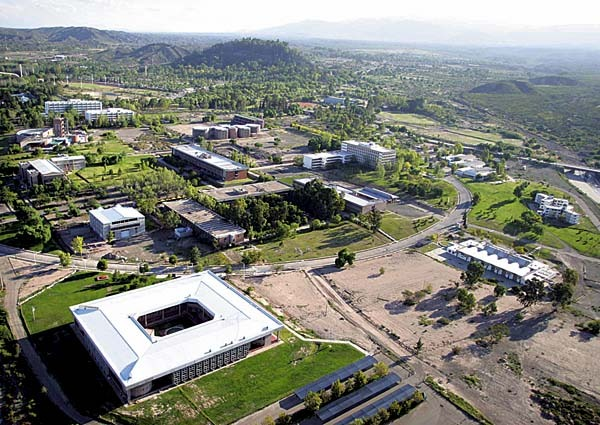
Campus

== History ==
The UNCuyo was established on March 21, 1939 by the presidential decree 26971. The university was established to offer tertiary education provision in the region of Cuyo (the provinces of Mendoza, San Juan and San Luis). At its foundation the university was composed of some existing higher education colleges, and new ones were incorporated. Regional affiliations were established in Human Sciences, Medicine, Agronomy and Economics in Mendoza, Engineering and Architecture in San Juan, and Natural Sciences in San Luis. These links remained in place until 1973. That year the National University of San Juan and the National University of San Luis were established from the adjunct faculties of the National University of Cuyo already in these regions. Thereafter, the National University of Cuyo concentrated itself in Mendoza, in addition to a campus in Río Negro Province: the Balseiro Institute.

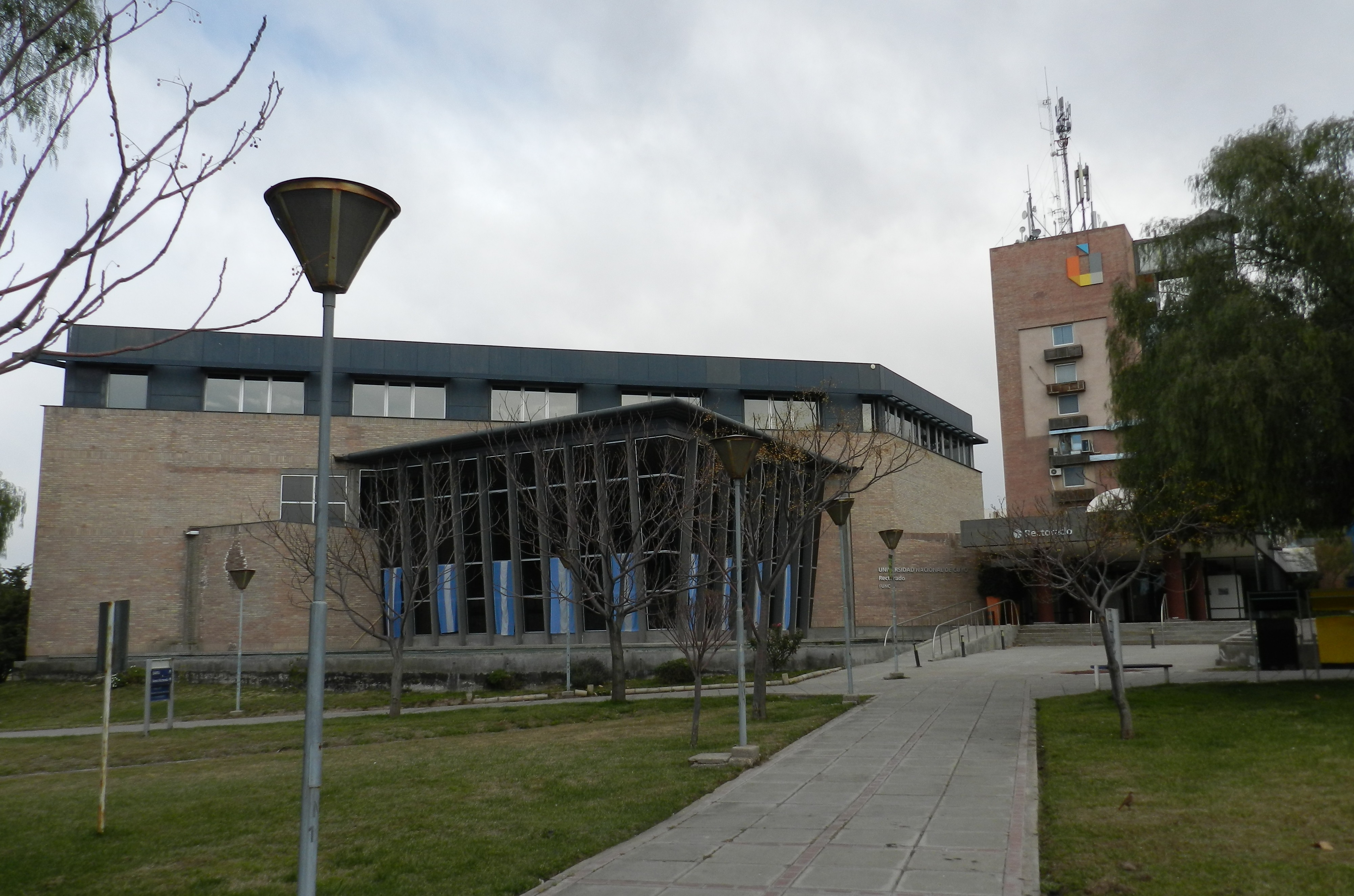
Principalship building

== Schools ==
=== School of Engineering ===
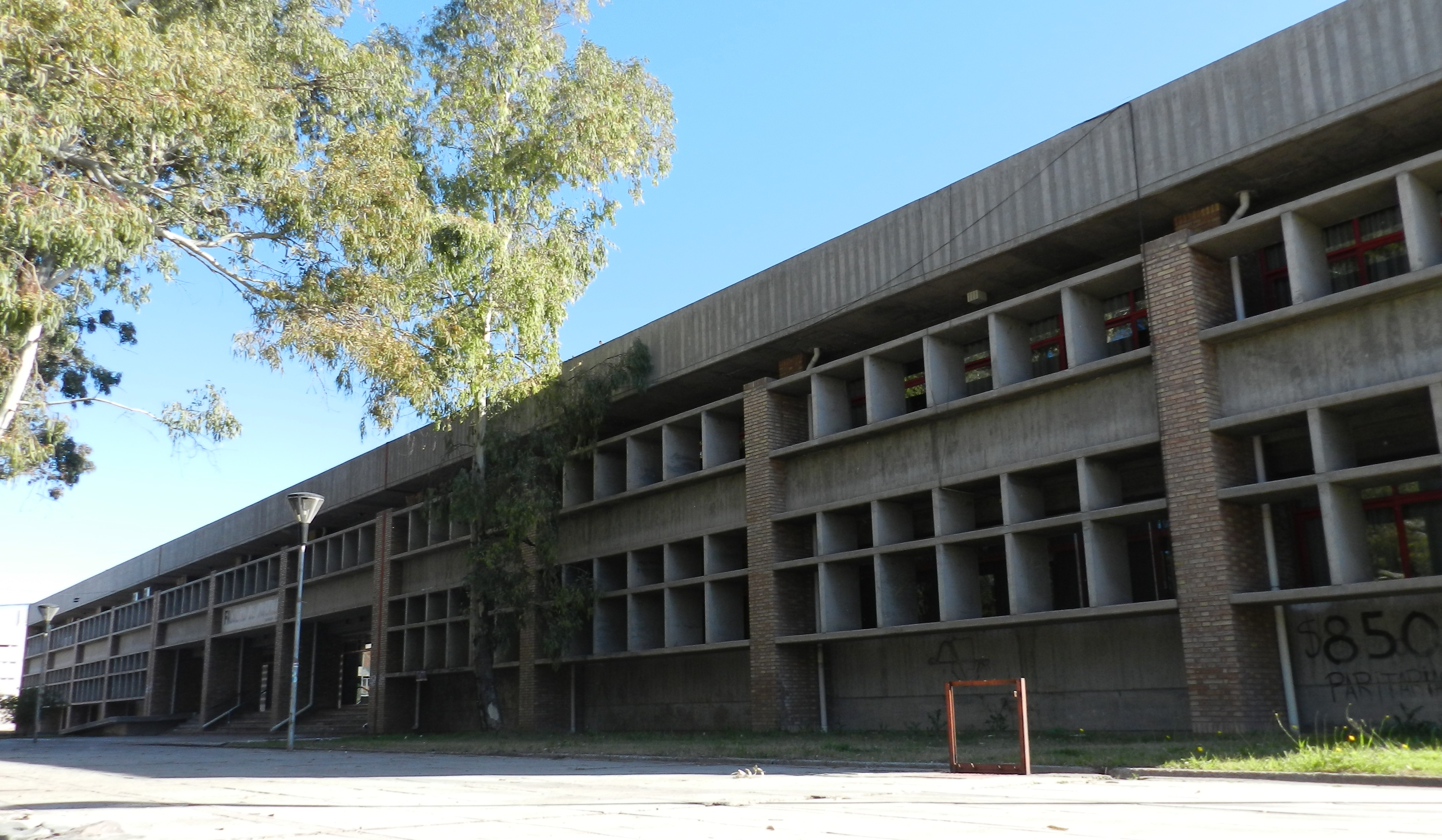
School of Engineering

- Industrial Engineering
- Civil Engineering
- Petroleum Engineering
- Mechatronics Engineering
- Architecture (since 2012)
- Computer Science (Since 2017)

==== Graduate ====
- PhD in Engineering
- Master in Logistics and Supply Chain Management
- Master in Environmental Engineering
- Specialization in Environmental Engineering
- Master in Energy
- Master in Structural Engineering
- Diploma in Administration and Direction of Projects
- Diploma in Administration and Control of Buildings
- Diploma in Management of Good Quality
- Diploma in Management of Innovations and Technologies of Information and Communication.

=== Balseiro Institute (San Carlos de Bariloche, Río Negro) ===
- Physics
- Nuclear Engineering
- Mechanical Engineering
- Telecommunications Engineering

==== Graduate ====
- PhD in Physics
- PhD in Nuclear Engineering
- PhD in Engineering Sciences
- Master of Physical Sciences
- Master of Medical Physics
- Master of Engineering.
- Specialization Nuclear Energy Technological Applications

=== School of Arts and Plastic Design ===
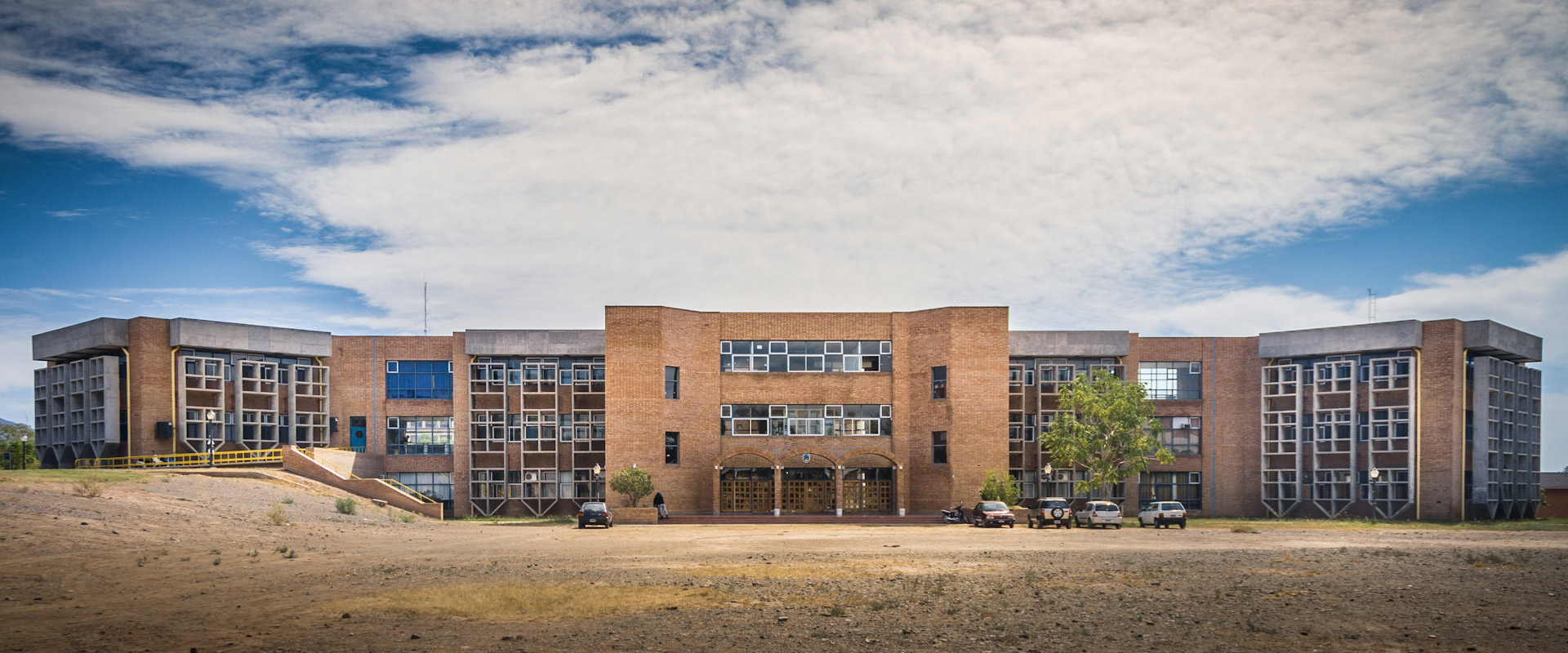
School of Arts and Plastic Design

- Art
- History of Art
- Sculpture
- Graphic design
- Industrial design
- Scenic design
- Voice
- Musicology
- Choral Direction
- Instruments
- Dramatic Arts
- Theatre Production

=== School of Economic Sciences ===
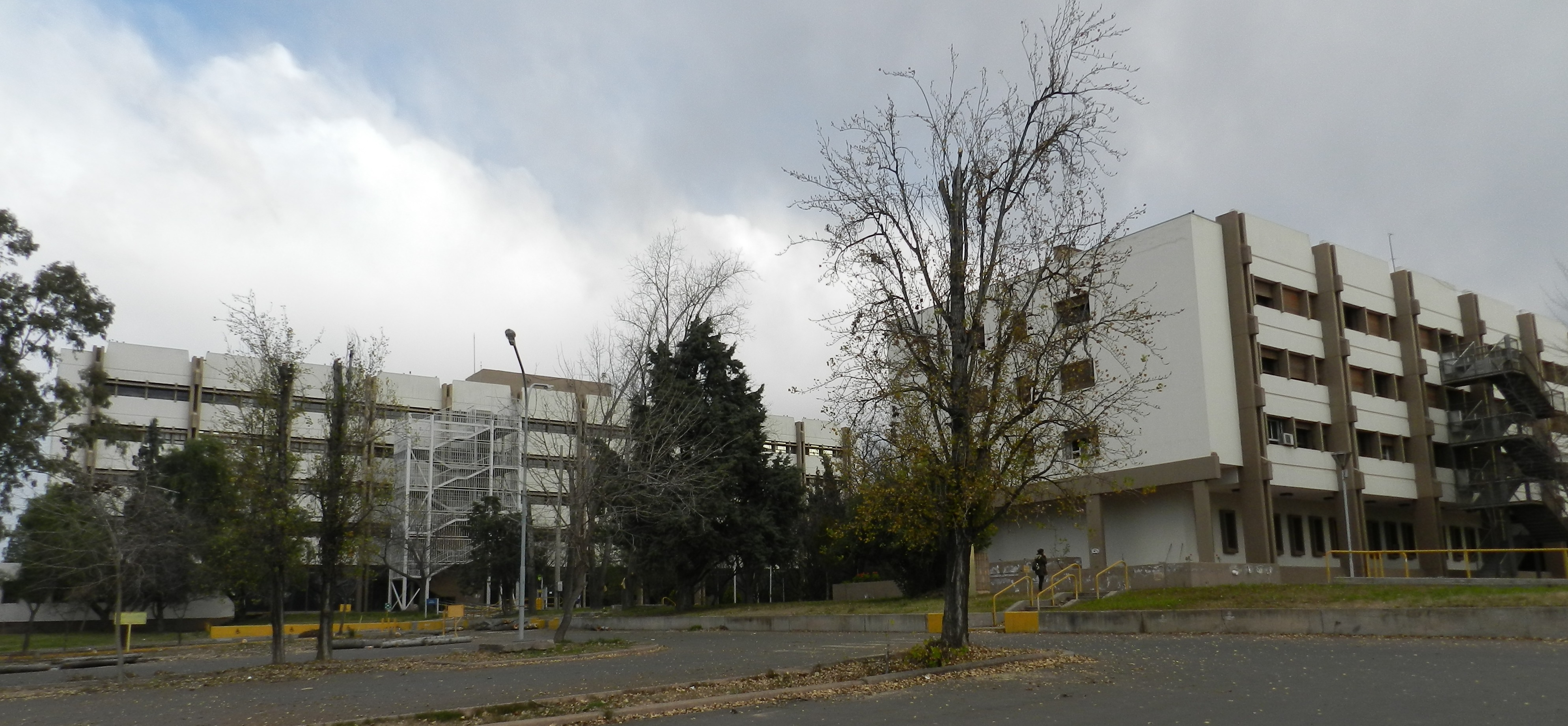
School of Economic Sciences

- Accountancy
- Business Administration
- Economics
- Logistics

==== Graduate ====
- MBA
- MBA - Executive
- Master in Management of Agroindustrial Business
- Master in Management of H.R. (Human Resources)
- Specialization in Costs and Management of Business
- Specialization in Technology Management
- Specialization in Labour Unions
- Course of Merging, Union and Scission of Enterprises.
- Course of Financial Strategy
- Course of Foreign Trade
- Course of Accounting

=== School of Exact and Natural Sciences ===
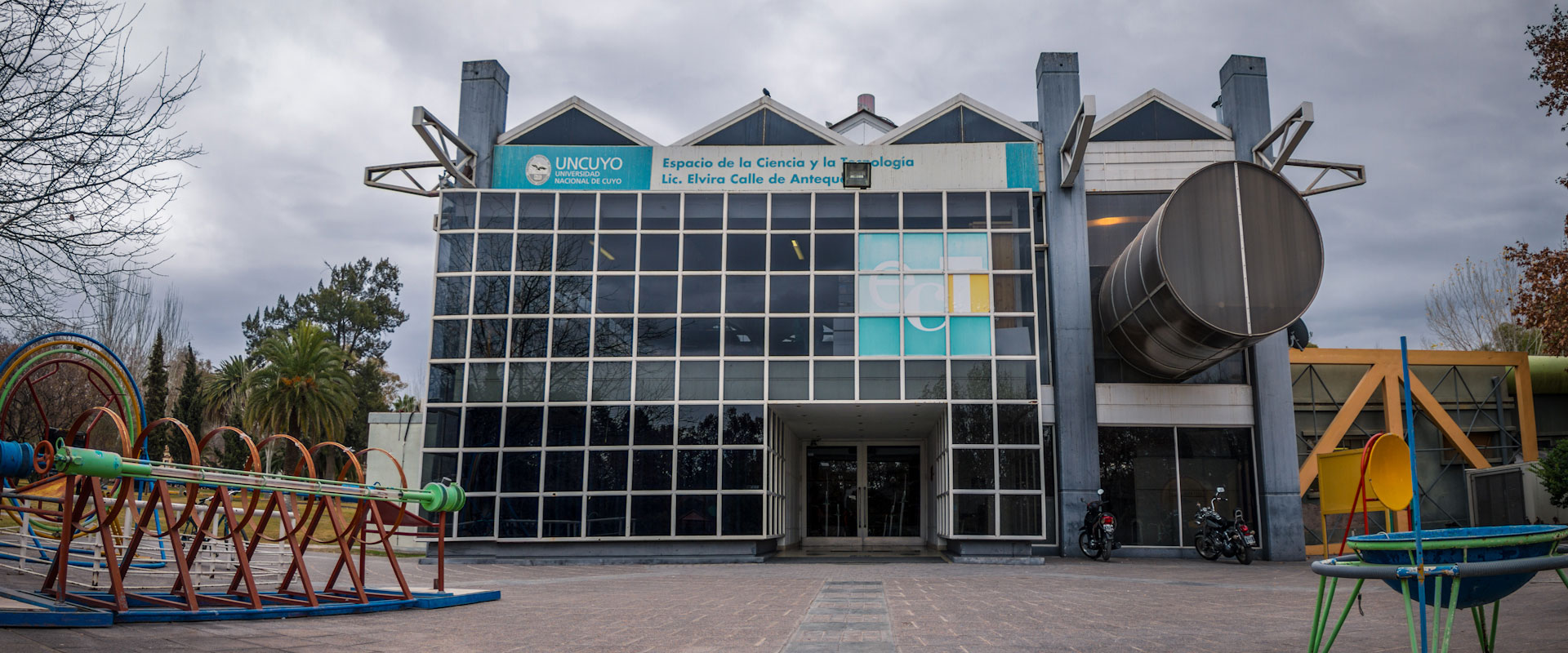
School of Exact and Natural Sciences

- Biology
- Mathematics
- Physics
- Chemistry

=== School of Medicine ===
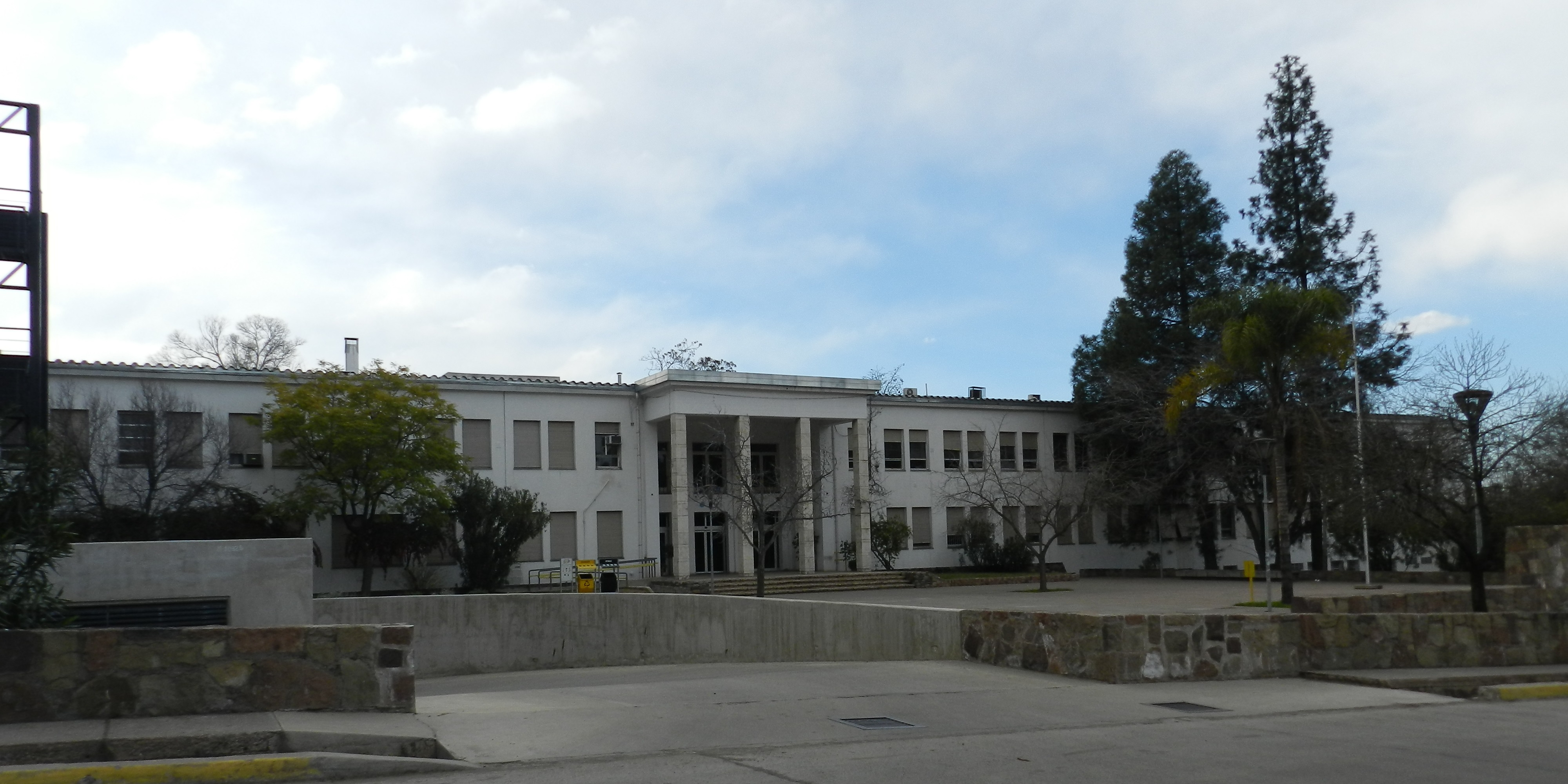
School of Medicine, UNCuyo

- Medicine
- Nursing
- Anaesthesiology
- Clinical Pathology
- Surgery
- Hematology
- Radiology

=== School of Social and Political Sciences ===
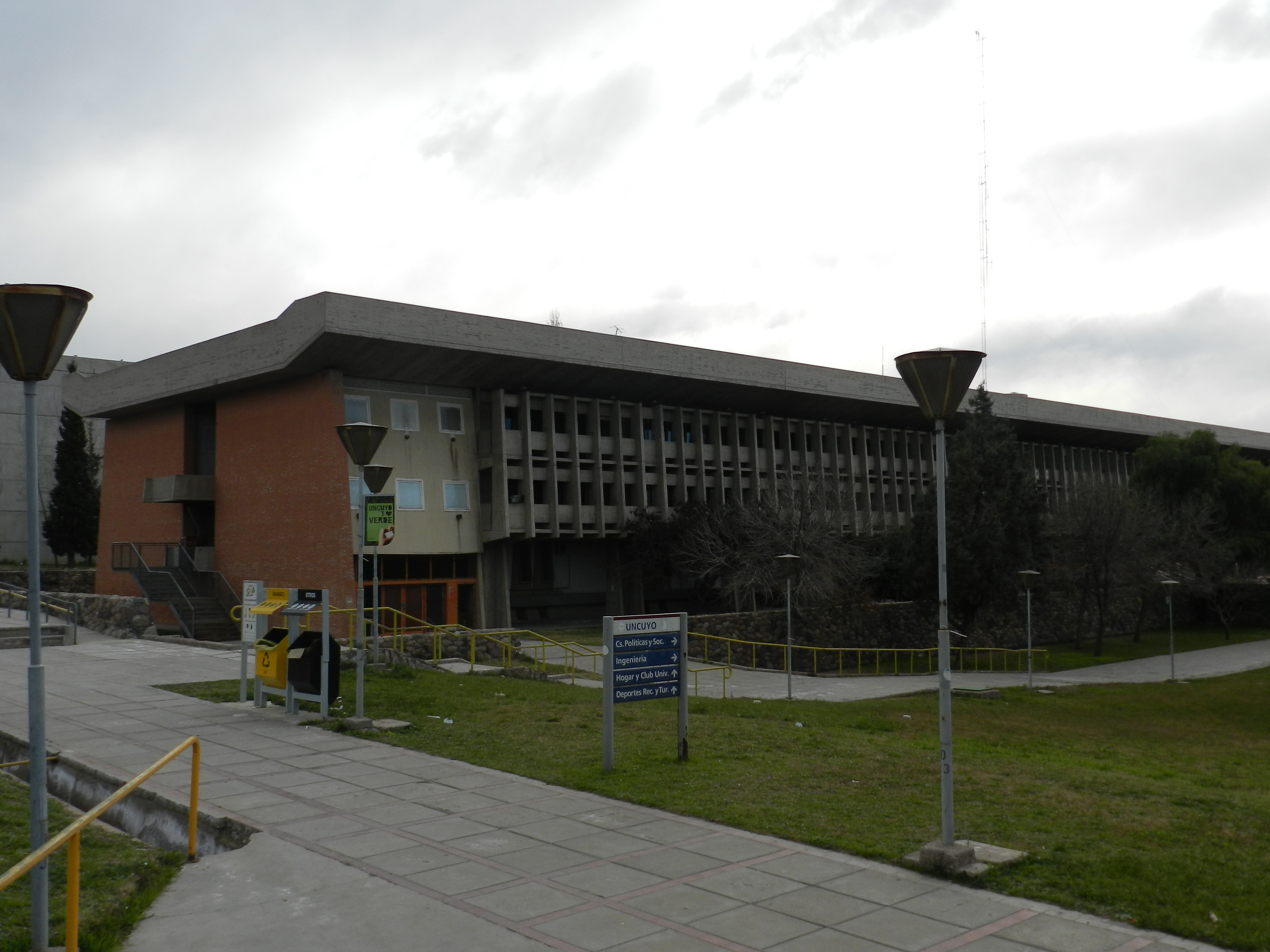
School of Social and Political Sciences

- PhD in Social Sciences
- Political Science and Public Administration
- Sociology
- Social Work
- Communication

=== School of Law ===
- Law

==== Graduate ====
- PhD in Law
- Specialization in Law of Damages
- Master of Administrative Law
- Specialization and Master of Magistrature and Steps of the Judicial process
- Specialization in Labour Law
- Course of Family Law
- Course of History for the Bicentennial

=== School of Humanities ===
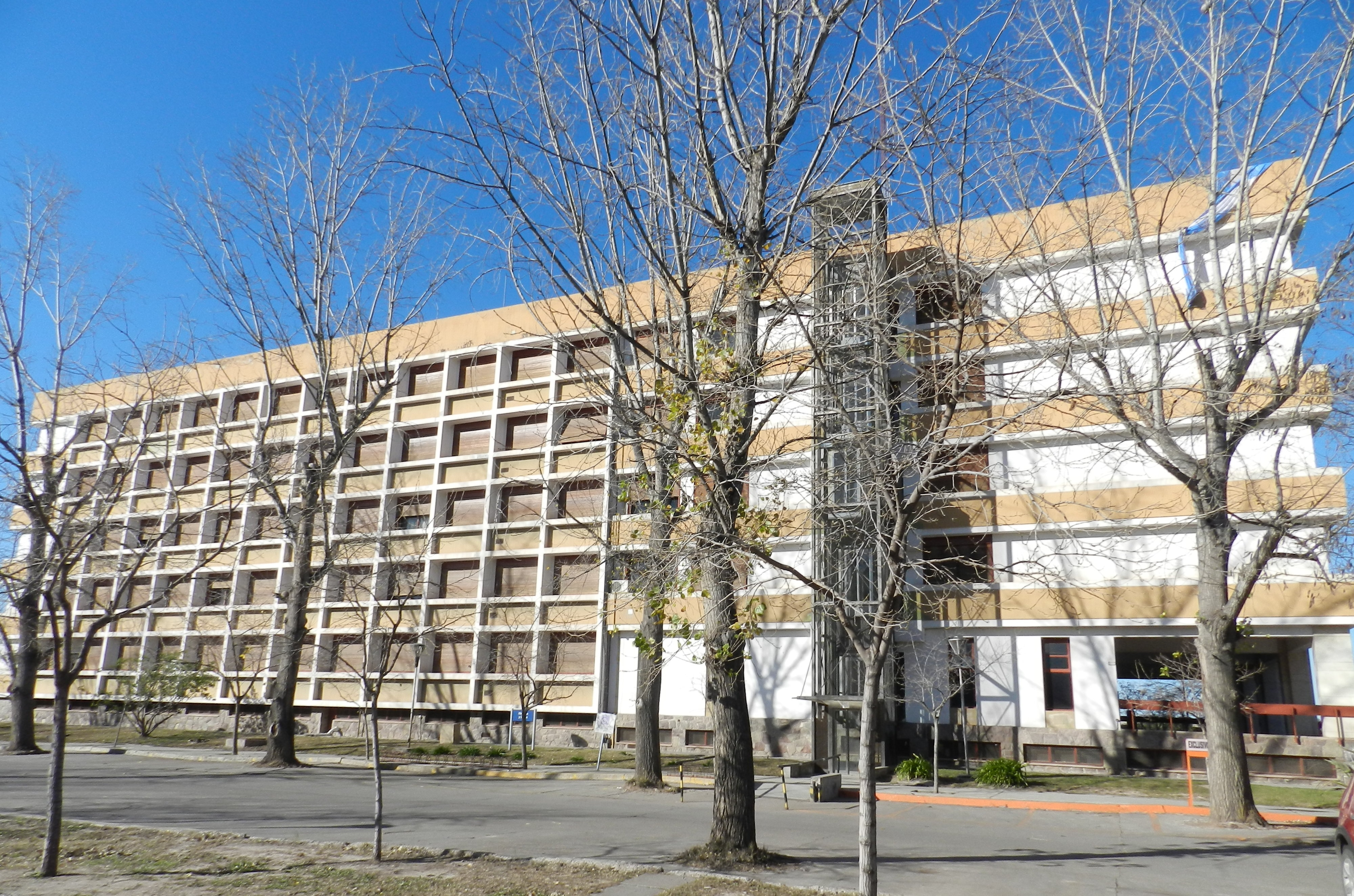
School of Humanities

- Archaeology
- Philosophy
- Philology
- History
- Geography
- French
- English
- Italian
- Education Sciences
- Tourism
- Languages (Spanish, English, Italian, Portuguese, French, German, Japanese, Chinese, Hebrew, Russian, among others)

=== School of Dentistry ===
- Dentistry
- Dental Hygiene

=== Elementary and Special-Needs Education ===
- Primary Education
- Education for the deaf
- Speech Therapy
- Education for the blind

=== School of Agricultural Sciences ===
- Agricultural Engineering
- Bromatology
- Natural and Renewable Resources Engineering

=== Applied Sciences (San Rafael, Mendoza) ===
- Food Engineering
- Chemical Engineering
- Mechanical Engineering
- Chemical Analysis
- Industrial Chemistry
- Bromatology

== Recent research ==
In recent research conducted by UNCuyo's students it was discovered how methods of cutting and preparing food can affect how many nutrients are retained in a meal. Notably they found that the thiosulfinates (that inhibit platelet aggregation and microparticle shedding) found in garlic and onions do not form until crushing or cutting. The research also demonstrated that steaming instead boiling is preferable as vegetables retain more of their water-soluble vitamins.

== See also ==
- Argentine universities
