= Enrique Gaviola =

Argentine physicist (1900–1989)

Ramón Enrique Gaviola
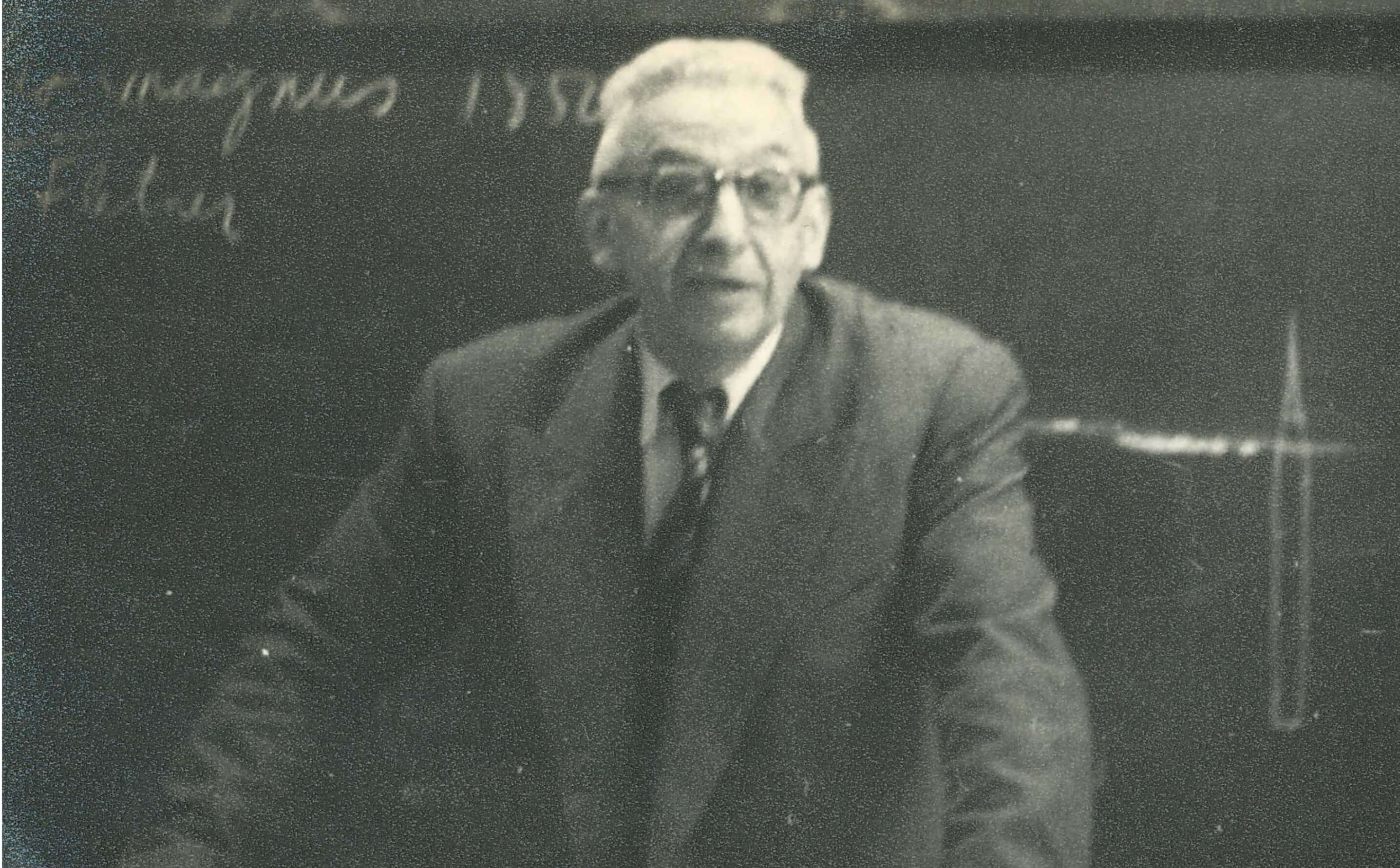
- Born: 31 August 1900; Mendoza, Argentina
- Died: 7 August 1989 (aged 88); Mendoza, Argentina
- Education: National University of La Plata
- Scientific career
- Fields: Astronomy

Ramón Enrique Gaviola (31 August 1900 in Mendoza – 7 August 1989 in Mendoza) was an Argentine astrophysicist. Student of Richard Gans at the Universidad de La Plata went in 1922 to Germany where he continued his studies in physics. He studied with Max Planck, Max Born and Albert Einstein, graduating from the University of Berlin in 1926.

Asteroid 2504 Gaviola is named after him.
