= Balseiro Institute =

Argentine academic institution

Coordinates: 41°09′57″S 71°26′39″W

- Instituto Balseiro
- Type: Research Institute
- Established: 1955
- Director: Dr. Mariano Cantero
- Administrative staff: 80
- Students: 160
- Undergraduates: 90
- Location: Bariloche, Río Negro, Argentina
- Website: www.ib.edu.ar
- Infobox data sourced from the Institute’s website.

Balseiro Institute (Spanish: Instituto Balseiro) is an Argentine academic institution that belongs partially to the National University of Cuyo and partially to the National Atomic Energy Commission. It is located in Bariloche, Río Negro province, Argentina. Notable alumni of this institute include Marcela Carena, Juan Maldacena, Juan Ignacio Galvan and Jorge Pullin.

== Overview ==
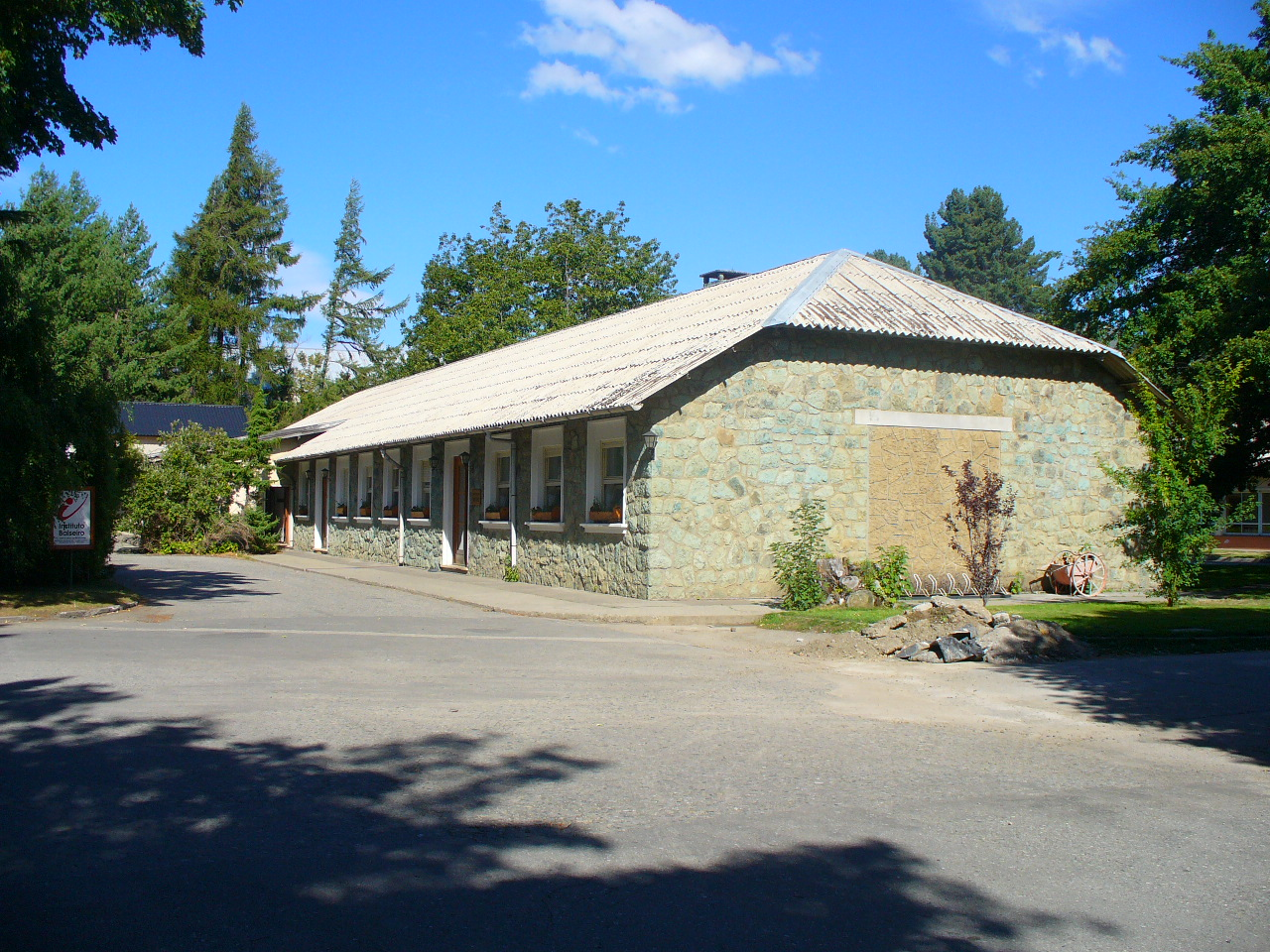
One of the Classroom Buildings at the Instituto Balseiro.

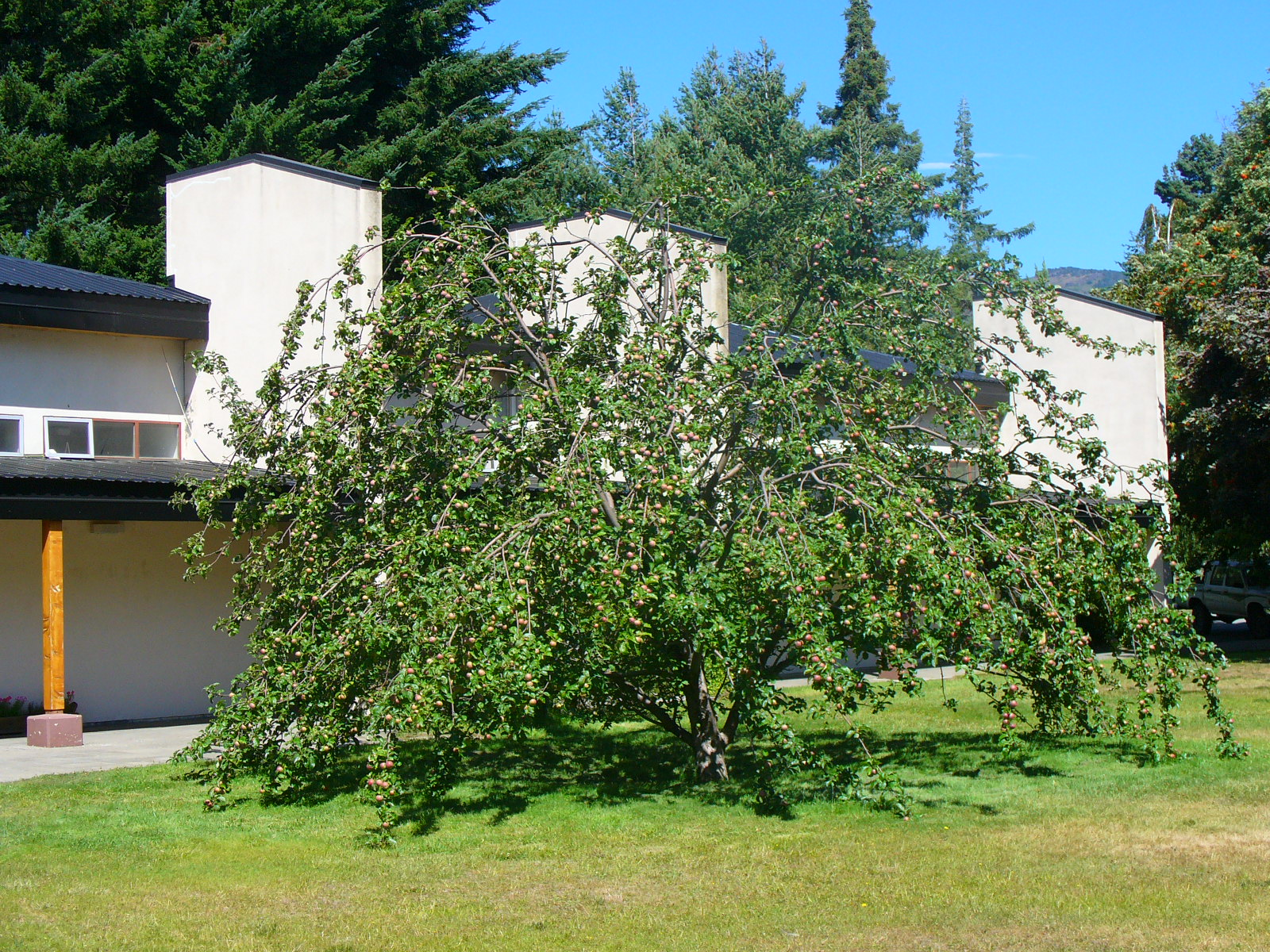
A reputed descendant of Newton's apple tree, found in the Instituto Balseiro library garden.

The Balseiro Institute teaches Physics, Nuclear Engineering, Mechanical Engineering and Telecommunications Engineering at undergraduate and graduate levels. The institute admits students who have completed two years of university studies (either in Physics or Engineering) and undergoes a rigorous admission procedure.

Since the creation of the Balseiro Institute to date (April 2013) 963 graduates and engineers, 234 masters, 460 doctorates and 112 specialists graduated from CEATEN (Specialization in Technological Applications of Nuclear Energy) graduated. Most of these professionals achieved a successful job placement.

== History ==
Nuclear research in the province of Rio Negro began as the Huemul Project in the Perón era. Nuclear facilities were organized as the Bariloche Atomic Centre, under the direction of José Antonio Balseiro.

An educational institution was established as the Instituto de Física de Bariloche on April 22, 1955, as a joint project of the National Atomic Energy Commission and the National University of Cuyo; the former administers the Bariloche Atomic Centre, whose work led to the first research reactor in Latin America (1957), as well as the region's first commercial reactor, Atucha I, in 1974. The institute was renamed in 1962 to honor José Antonio Balseiro, who was its first director.

The first graduates were members of the Physics class of 1958. In the 1970s, Balseiro became the only institute in Argentina to grant degrees in nuclear engineering, as the country was stepping up its nuclear program with the incorporation of the Embalse and Atucha II, as well as continued research activity in the Constituyentes and Bariloche reactors.

== See also ==
- Sabato Institute of Technology
- INVAP
- Gregorio Baro
- Guido Beck
- Think tank#Argentina
- List of Guggenheim Fellowships awarded in 2001
- List of Guggenheim Fellowships awarded in 2007
