= List of Guggenheim Fellowships awarded in 2007 =

List of Guggenheim Fellowships awarded in 2007.

== 2007 U.S. and Canadian Fellows ==
- Daniel Alarcón, Writer, Oakland, California; Distinguished Visiting Writer, Mills College: Fiction.
- Rick Altman, Professor of Cinema and Comparative Literature, University of Iowa: Classical Hollywood sound.
- Warwick Anderson, Robert Turell Professor of Medical History and Population Health, University of Wisconsin, Madison: The science of race mixing in the twentieth century.
- Shawn Atkins, Animation Filmmaker, House of Frame by Frame Fierce, Inc: Film animation.
- SoHyun Bae, Artist, New York City and Bologna, Italy: Visual arts.
- William Baer, Professor of English, University of Evansville: The sonnets of Bocage.
- Rennan Barkana, Senior Lecturer, School of Astronomy and Physics, Tel Aviv University: Gas and stars in the early universe.
- Shadi Bartsch, Ann L. and Lawrence B. Buttenwieser Professor of Classics, University of Chicago: Philosophy and the figural in antiquity.
- David A. Baum, Professor of Botany, University of Wisconsin, Madison: Applying phylogenetics to problems in evolution and evolutionary education.
- Timothy Beach, Associate Professor of Geography, School of Foreign Service Program in Science, Technology, and International Affairs, Georgetown University: Environmental history of the Maya lowlands.
- Daphne Berdahl, Associate Professor of Anthropology and Global Studies, University of Minnesota: Citizenship and mass consumption in post-wall Germany.
- Domenico Bertoloni Meli, Professor of the History and Philosophy of Science, Indiana University: Marcello Malpighi and mechanistic medicine.
- Edmund Bertschinger, Professor of Physics, Massachusetts Institute of Technology: Physics of the cosmic microwave background.
- Eric R. Bittner, Associate Professor of Chemistry, University of Houston: Quantum dynamics in molecular electronic devices.
- Hisham M. Bizri, Assistant Professor of Cultural Studies and Comparative Literature, University of Minnesota: Filmmaking.
- Jane Ira Bloom, Composer, New York City; Associate Professor of Jazz and Contemporary Music, New School University: Music composition.
- Lawrence D. Bobo, Martin Luther King, Jr., Centennial Professor, and Director, Center for Comparative Studies in Race and Ethnicity, Stanford University: Black and white Americans' views of the new law and order regime.
- Rosalyn Bodycomb, Artist, Long Island City, New York: Painting.
- Jennifer Bolande, Artist, Joshua Tree, California; Professor of New Genres, Department of Art, University of California, Los Angeles: Fine arts.
- Robert Bordo, Artist, Valatie, New York; Associate Professor of Art, Cooper Union School of Art: Painting.
- Catherine Anne Brekus, Associate Professor, University of Chicago Divinity School: Evangelicalism and the Enlightenment in 18th-century America.
- Jeffrey F. Brock, Associate Professor of Mathematics, Brown University: Models, bounds, and effective rigidity in hyperbolic geometry.
- Kevin Brockmeier, Writer, Little Rock, Arkansas: Fiction.
- Elizabeth Brown, Composer and Performer, Brooklyn, New York: Music composition.
- Jane Brox, Writer, Brunswick, Maine; Nonfiction Writing Faculty Member, Low Residency MFA Program, Lesley University: A history of controlled light.
- Christopher Buckley, Poet, Lompoc, California; Professor, Department of Creative Writing, University of California, Riverside: Poetry.
- Alan Burdick, Writer, Hastings-on-Hudson, New York: About the biology of time.
- Don Byron, Composer, Boiceville, New York; Visiting Associate Professor, The University at Albany: Music composition.
- Daniel Carpenter, Professor of Government, and Director, Center for American Political Studies, Harvard University: The American antislavery petition in context.
- Cynthia Carr, Writer, New York City: The life of David Wojnarowicz.
- Natalie Charkow Hollander, Sculptor, Woodbridge, Connecticut: Sculpture.
- Bruce Charlesworth, Video Artist, Murpysboro, Illinois; Adjunct Professor of Cinema and Photography, Southern Illinois University: Video-based installation.
- Chris Lan Hui Chou, Artist, Allston, Massachusetts: Painting.
- Nikos Chrisochoides, Alumni Memorial Distinguished Associate Professor, College of William and Mary: Medical image analysis.
- James Clifford, Professor, History of Consciousness Department, University of California, Santa Cruz: Indigenous cultural politics today.
- Richard Conniff, Writer, Old Lyme, Connecticut: Discovering life on a little-known planet.
- Margaret Crawford, Professor of Urban Design and Planning Theory, Graduate School of Design, Harvard University: Rethinking urban space.
- Thomas James Dandelet, Associate Professor of History, University of California, Berkeley: The Colonna of Rome, 1500-1700.
- Diana K. Davis, Assistant Professor of Geography and Middle Eastern Studies, University of Texas, Austin: Imperialism and environmental history in the Middle East.
- Greg Delanty, Poet, Burlington, Vermont; Assistant Professor of English and Artist-in-residence, St. Michael's College: Poetry.
- Fred M. Donner, Professor of Near Eastern History, Department of Near Eastern Languages and Civilizations, and The Oriental Institute, The University of Chicago: Early Islamic political vocabulary.
- Paquito D'Rivera, Composer, North Bergen, New Jersey: Music composition.
- Mary L. Dudziak, Judge Edward J. and Ruey L. Guirado Professor of Law, History, and Political Science, University of Southern California: How war made America in the 20th century.
- David Dzubay, Composer, Bloomington, Indiana; Professor of Music, and Director, New Music Ensemble, Indiana University: Music composition.
- Debra Magpie Earling, Writer, Missoula, Montana; Associate Professor of English and Creative Writing, University of Montana: Fiction.
- Rinde Eckert, Composer, Nyack, New York: Music composition.
- Kenneth Eng, Filmmaker, Brooklyn, New York; Film Director and Editor, Projectile Arts, Inc: Film.
- Steve Erickson, Writer, Topanga Canyon, California; Instructor, California Institute of the Arts: Fiction.
- W. Ralph Eubanks, Director of Publishing, Library of Congress: A story of race, reconciliation, and identity.
- Sidra DeKoven Ezrahi, Professor of Comparative Jewish Literature, Institute of Contemporary Jewry, Hebrew University of Jerusalem: Jerusalem and the poetics of return.
- Heide Fehrenbach, Professor of History, Northern Illinois University: How World War II remade the family.
- William Ferris, Joel R. Williamson Eminent Professor of History, University of North Carolina, Chapel Hill: Voices and roots: Mississippi blues.
- Maria Flook, Writer, Truro, Massachusetts; Distinguished Writer-in-residence, Emerson College; Fiction Faculty Member, Fine Arts Work Center, Provincetown, Massachusetts: Fiction.
- Michael P. Flynn, Associate Professor, Department of Electrical Engineering and Computer Science, University of Michigan: The fundamental limits of analog-to-digital conversion.
- Neil Foley, Associate Professor of History, University of Texas, Austin: Civil rights in Texas and the Southwest, 1940-1965.
- Ed Folsom, Roy J. Carver Professor of English, University of Iowa: A biography of Walt Whitman's Leaves of Grass.
- David Frankfurter, Professor of Religious Studies and History, University of New Hampshire: Christianization in late antique Egypt.
- Erica Funkhouser, Poet, Essex, Massachusetts; Lecturer, Department of Writing and Humanistic Studies, Massachusetts Institute of Technology: Poetry.
- Ann Gale, Artist, Seattle, Washington; Associate Professor, School of Art, University of Washington: Painting.
- Enrique García Santo-Tomás, Associate Professor of Spanish, University of Michigan: Fictions by war veterans in early modern Spanish literature, 1550-1680.
- Mark Gertler, Henry and Lucy Moses Professor of Economics, New York University: The international dimensions of monetary policy.
- J. Arch Getty, Professor of History, University of California, Los Angeles: Folkways, political practices, and the Soviet state.
- Melissa James Gibson, Playwright, Brooklyn, New York; College Counselor, Saint Ann's School: The architecture of memory.
- Michel X. Goemans, Professor of Applied Mathematics, Massachusetts Institute of Technology: The traveling salesman problem.
- Bob Goldstein, Associate Professor of Biology, University of North Carolina, Chapel Hill: Cell interactions in the asymmetric division of stem cells.
- Michael Goldstein, Professor of Mathematics, University of Toronto: Anderson localization of Eigen functions.
- Joe Goode, Choreographer, Berkeley, California; Artistic Director, Joe Goode Performance Group; Professor, Department of Theater, Dance, and Performance Studies, University of California, Berkeley: Choreography.
- Michael Gorra, Mary Augusta Jordan Professor of English, Smith College: A study of Henry James.
- Robert J. Griffin, Associate Professor of English, Texas A & M University: Anonymity and authorship.
- Mary Hambleton, Artist, Brooklyn, New York; Adjunct Assistant Professor of Fine Arts, Parsons The New School for Design, New School University: Painting.
- Susan Ashbrook Harvey, Professor of Religious Studies, Brown University: Biblical women and women's choirs in Syriac tradition.
- Arjun M. Heimsath, Assistant Professor, Department of Earth Sciences, Dartmouth College: Soil erosion and sustainability.
- Carola Hein, Associate Professor and Acting Chair, Growth and Structure of Cities Program: The global architecture of oil.
- Gail Hershatter, Professor of History, University of California, Santa Cruz: Rural women and China's collective past.
- John Hollenbeck, Composer, New York City: Music composition.
- Paul Horwich, Professor of Philosophy, New York University: Wittgenstein's metaphilosophy.
- Brett R. Ingram, Filmmaker, Greensboro, North Carolina; Assistant Professor of Broadcasting and Cinema, University of North Carolina, Greensboro: Film.
- Jim Jennings, Filmmaker, Long Island City, New York: Film.
- Fenton Johnson, Writer, Tucson, Arizona; Associate Professor, Creative Writing Program, University of Arizona: Desire in Solitude (nonfiction).
- A. Van Jordan, Poet, Austin, Texas; Assistant Professor of English, University of Texas, Austin: Poetry.
- Heidi Julavits, Writer, New York City: Fiction.
- Stathis N. Kalyvas, Arnold Wolfers Professor of Political Science, and Director, Program on Order, Conflict, and Violence, Yale University: Varieties of political violence.
- Kathryn Kerby-Fulton, The Notre Dame Professor of English, Notre Dame University: Professional reading circles and the rise of English literature.
- Sanjeev Khanna, Professor of Computer and Information Science, University of Pennsylvania: Cuts, flows, and network routing.
- Dina Rizk Khoury, Associate Professor of History and International Affairs, and Director, Graduate Studies, George Washington University: War and remembrance in Iraq.
- Verlyn Klinkenborg, Writer, The New York Times: The radical essence of William Cobbett.
- Koosil-ja, Artistic Director and Choreographer, Dansology, Inc. koosil-ja/danceKUMIKO, New York City: Choreography.
- Paul W. Kroll, Professor of Chinese, University of Colorado: A study of High Tang verse.
- Tania León, Composer, Nyack, New York; Distinguished Professor, Brooklyn College of the City University of New York: Music composition.
- Dana Levin, Poet, Santa Fe, New Mexico; Associate Professor of Creative Writing and Literature, College of Santa Fe (now Santa Fe University of Art and Design): Poetry.
- Philippa Levine, Professor of History, University of Southern California: The evolution debates.
- Michael Light, Artist, San Francisco, California: Photography.
- Meredith Lillich, Professor of Fine Arts, Syracuse University: The Gothic stained glass of Reims Cathedral.
- Kalup Linzy, Artist, Brooklyn, New York: Video.
- Peter D. Little, Professor and Chair, Department of Anthropology, University of Kentucky: The anthropology of neoliberalism in sub-Saharan Africa.
- Alan Loehle, Artist, Decatur, Georgia; Associate Professor of Studio Art, Oglethorpe University: Painting.
- Pamela O. Long, Independent Historian; Visiting Professor, Bard Graduate Center, New York City: Engineering, power, and knowledge in Rome, 1560-1590.
- Margaretta M. Lovell, Professor of Art History, University of California, Berkeley: Fitz H. Lane and Winslow Homer.
- Tanya Luhrmann, Professor of Anthropology, Stanford University: Making God real in evangelical Christianity.
- Arthur Lupia, Hal R. Varian Collegiate Professor of Political Science, University of Michigan: Political knowledge and the practice of civic education.
- Rudresh K. Mahanthappa, Composer, Brooklyn, New York; Adjunct Private Lesson Instructor, Rye Country Day School: Music composition.
- Gary J. Marker, Professor of History, State University of New York, Stony Brook: The idea of "Russia" in clerical discourse.
- Michael McCann, Gordon Hirabayashi Professor for the Advancement of Citizenship, University of Washington: Public interest litigation and the politics of responsibility.
- Dianne McIntyre, Choreographer, Cleveland: Choreography.
- Peter H. McMurry, Professor of Mechanical Engineering, University of Minnesota: New particle formation and growth rates in the atmosphere.
- Suketu Mehta, Writer, Cliffside Park, New Jersey: A nonfiction book on New York.
- Roberto Merlin, Professor of Physics and of Electrical Engineering and Computer Science, University of Michigan: Sub-nanometer imaging with sub-picosecond resolution.
- Piotr Michałowski, George G. Cameron Professor of Ancient Near Eastern Civilizations, University of Michigan: The cyclical birth and rebirth of early Mesopotamian literature.
- Jerry Xhelal Mitrovica, Professor of Physics, University of Toronto: Polar wander and the long-term evolution of Earth.
- Paul G. Molyneaux, Journalist and Writer, Whiting, Maine: Charting the course to sustainable seafood.
- Malena Mörling, Poet, Wrightsville Beach, North Carolina; Assistant Professor of Poetry, University of North Carolina, Wilmington: Poetry.
- Bradford Morrow, Writer, New York City; Professor of Literature and Bard Center Fellow, Bard College: Fiction.
- Naeem Murr, Writer, Chicago: Fiction.
- Sabina Murray, Writer, Amherst, Massachusetts; Associate Professor of English, MFA Program, University of Massachusetts, Amherst: Fiction.
- Peter Nabokov, Professor, Department of American Indian Studies and World Arts and Cultures, University of California, Los Angeles: The passages of Edward Proctor Hunt.
- Erika Naginski, Associate Professor of Architecture, Massachusetts Institute of Technology: Architecture, the graphic arts, and the philosophy of history in the 18th century.
- Sara Tilghman Nalle, Professor of History, William Paterson University: A new history of the Spanish family, 1520-1720.
- Victor Nee, Goldwin Smith Professor of Sociology, Cornell University: Market transition and politicized capitalism.
- J. David Neelin, Professor, Department of Atmospheric and Oceanic Sciences and Institute of Geophysics and Planetary Physics, University of California, Los Angeles: Rethinking rain in climate models.
- Samuel Nigro, Artist, Brooklyn, New York: Sculpture.
- D. Nurkse, Poet, Brooklyn, New York; Professor, Graduate Writing Program, Sarah Lawrence College: Poetry.
- Karyn Andrea Olivier, Artist, Brooklyn, New York; Assistant Professor, Tyler School of Art, Temple University: Installation art.
- Sarah Oppenheimer, Artist, New York City; Assistant Professor, Yale University School of Art: Installation art.
- Annie-B Parson, Choreographer, Brooklyn, New York; Artistic Director, Big Dance Theater; Instructor in Choreography, Tisch School of the Arts, New York University: Choreography.
- Andrew H. Paterson, Distinguished Research Professor, University of Georgia: Unraveling structural and functional divergence of cereal genomes.
- Doug Peacock, Writer, Green Valley, Arizona, and Livingston, Montana: Repatriation.
- Kathleen Peirce, Poet, Wimberley, Texas; Professor of English, Texas State University: Poetry.
- Michael Philip Penn, Assistant Professor of Religion and of Gender Studies, Mount Holyoke College: Syriac Christian reactions to the Islamic conquests.
- Peter Pesic, Tutor and Musician-in-residence, St. John's College, Santa Fe: Connections between music and natural philosophy.
- Julie Stone Peters, Professor of English and Comparative Literature, Columbia University: Theatrical censorship, obscenity, and the making of modern drama.
- Leila Stott Philip, Associate Professor of English and Creative Writing, College of the Holy Cross: A portrait of Toshiko Takaezu.
- Laura Poitras, Documentary Filmmaker, New York City: Film.
- Richard Owen Prum, William Robertson Coe Professor and Curator of Ornithology, Yale University: The biology of feathers.
- Lawrence Raab, Poet, Williamstown, Massachusetts; Morris Professor of Rhetoric, Williams College: Poetry.
- Geraldine L. Richmond, Richard M. and Patricia H. Noyes Professor of Chemistry, University of Oregon: Environmental sustainability.
- Mary Louise Roberts, Professor of History, University of Wisconsin, Madison: The American military presence in France, 1944-1945.
- Daniel T. Rodgers, Henry Charles Lea Professor of History, Princeton University: Transformation in social thought in 1980s America.
- Pej Rohani, Associate Professor, Institute of Ecology, University of Georgia: The ecology and evolution of dengue.
- Richard Ross, Photographer, Santa Barbara, California; Professor of Art, University of California, Santa Barbara: Photography.
- Teofilo F. Ruiz, Professor of History, University of California, Los Angeles: Festivals, rituals, and power in late medieval and early modern Spain.
- Michael L. Satlow, Associate Professor of Religious Studies and Judaic Studies, Brown University: Jewish piety in late antiquity.
- José Alexandre Scheinkman, Theodore Wells '29 Professor of Economics, Princeton University: The economics of the informal sector.
- Michael Scrivener, Professor of English, Wayne State University: Jewish representations in Romantic-era British literature.
- Robert Self, Associate Professor of History, Brown University: Gender and sexuality in America from Watts to Reagan.
- Laurie Shannon, E. Blake Byrne Associate Professor of English, Duke University: Zoographies of knowledge in early modernity.
- Kay Kaufman Shelemay, G. Gordon Watts Professor of Music, and Professor of African and African American Studies, Harvard University: Ethiopian music and musicians in the United States.
- Anne C. Shreffler, James Edward Ditson Professor of Music, Harvard University: New music, avant-garde, and politics in the early Cold War.
- Amie Siegel, Filmmaker, New York City: Film.
- A. Mark Smith, Curators' Professor of History, University of Missouri, Columbia: Alhacen on refraction.
- Nigel Smith, Professor of English, Princeton University: Literary production in early modern Europe, 1500-1700.
- Dava Sobel, Science Writer, East Hampton, New York: Copernicus.
- Elaine Spatz‑Rabinowitz, Artist, Cambridge, Massachusetts; Professor of Art, Wellesley College: Painting.
- Dana Spiotta, Writer, Cherry Valley, New York: Fiction.
- Anne Whiston Spirn, Professor of Landscape Architecture and Planning, Massachusetts Institute of Technology: Rebuilding the landscape of community.
- Nick Spitzer, Professor of Folklore and Cultural Conservation, University of New Orleans; Producer, American Routes, Public Radio International: Tradition and creativity in Louisiana Creole communities.
- RoseAnne Spradlin, Choreographer, New York City: Choreography.
- Scott Stark, Filmmaker, Austin, Texas; Associate Information Developer, IBM: Film.
- Mark D. Steinberg, Professor of History, and Editor, Slavic Review, University of Illinois, Urbana-Champaign: Landscapes of the modern in fin de siècle St. Petersburg.
- James Robert Stewart, Artist, Fredonia, Pennsylvania: Painting.
- Raymond Stock, Writer and Arabic-English Translator, Beulah, Michigan: A biography of Naguib Mahfouz.
- Nancy Lynn Sullivan, Independent Researcher, Papua New Guinea; Director and Principal Investigator, Nancy Sullivan & Associates: The cave arts of the upper Karawari in Papua New Guinea.
- Cynthia Talbot, Associate Professor of History and Asian Studies, University of Texas, Austin: Recasting the medieval Indian past.
- Michael J. Tarr, Professor of Cognitive and Linguistic Sciences, and Fox Professor of Ophthalmology and Visual Sciences, Brown University: Statistical models of structural visual object recognition in humans.
- R. Larry Todd, Arts and Sciences Professor of Music, Duke University: The life and music of Fanny Mendelssohn Hensel.
- David Treuer, Associate Professor of English, University of Minnesota: Contemporary reservation life.
- Dmitri Tymoczko, Composer, Princeton, New Jersey; Assistant Professor of Music, Princeton University: Music composition.
- Eric Urban, Professor of Mathematics, Columbia University: P-adic automorphic forms and p-adic L-functions.
- Salil Vadhan, Gordon McKay Professor of Computer Science and Applied Mathematics, Harvard University: The complexity of zero-knowledge proofs.
- David Van Tieghem, Composer, West Hurley, New York: Music composition.
- Lawrence Venuti, Professor of English, Temple University: A translation of Giovanni Pascoli's poetry and prose.
- Jorge M. Vivanco, Director and Associate Professor, Center for Rhizosphere Biology, Colorado State University: Investigations in tropical chemical ecology.
- Michael Wachtel, Professor of Russian Literature, Princeton University: Pushkin's lyric poetry.
- John Walbridge, Professor of Near Eastern Languages and Cultures, Indiana University: Shirazi's synthesis of the philosophical foundations of Galenic medicine.
- Pamela Barnhouse Walters, James H. Rudy Professor of Sociology, Indiana University: Apartheid schooling in America.
- Bernard Wasserstein, Harriet and Ulrich E. Meyer Professor of Modern European Jewish History, University of Chicago: Jewish intellectuals in postwar Europe.
- Andrew Watsky, Associate Professor of Art, Vassar College: Named objects in Momoyama Japan.
- Sandra R. Waxman, Professor of Psychology, Northwestern University: Notions of the natural world.
- Alex Webb, Photographer, Brooklyn, New York: Photography.
- Donald Weber, Photographer, Toronto, Canada: Photography.
- Barbara Weissberger, Artist, Pittsburgh, Pennsylvania; Visiting Lecturer, Studio Arts Department, University of Pittsburgh: Drawing.
- Stephen Westfall, Artist, New York City; Assistant Professor, Mason Gross School of the Arts, Rutgers University; Cochair, Department of Painting, Milton Avery Graduate School of the Arts, Bard College: Painting.
- Jeff Whetstone, Photographer, Durham, North Carolina; Assistant Professor of Art, University of North Carolina, Chapel Hill: Photography.
- David Gordon White, Professor, Department of Religious Studies, University of California, Santa Barbara: The Indian yogi, 200 BC - 2000 CE.
- Tommy White, Artist, New York City; Lecturer, Center for the Creative and Performing Arts, Princeton University: Painting.
- Mark Winey, Professor of Molecular, Cellular, and Developmental Biology, University of Colorado, Boulder: Gene discovery in human ciliary diseases.
- Michele Wucker, Senior Fellow, World Policy Institute, New York City: Evolving views of citizenship, belonging, and exclusion.
- Peter Zandstra, Associate Professor, Institute of Biomaterials and Biomedical Engineering, University of Toronto: Engineering stem cell fate.
- Shoucheng Zhang, Professor of Physics, Stanford University: Quantum spin Hall effect.
- Lisa Zunshine, Associate Professor of English, University of Kentucky: Cognitive science and literary interpretations.

== Latin American and Caribbean Fellows ==
- Leonor Arfuch, Professor, Faculty of Social Sciences, University of Buenos Aires, and Professor of Design and City Planning, City University Pabellón III: Identity, subjectivity, memory: narratives of the recent past.
- Cesar Alfredo Barbero, Associate Professor, National University of Rio Cuarto, and Principal Researcher, CONICET: Development of novel nanomaterials.
- Daniela Broitman, Director and Producer, VideoForum Filmes: Film.
- Marcelo Coglitore, Photographer, Buenos Aires: Photography.
- N. Rubén Cuneo, Independent Researcher, CONICET, and Director, Museo Paleontológico Egidio Feruglio (MEF): The K-T floral transition in the southern hemisphere.
- Saurabh Dube, Professor of History, Center for Asian and African Studies, College of Mexico: Christianity, colonialism, and conversion, 1860-2005.
- Jorge Durand, Professor, University of Guadalajara: Latin American migration and the creation of new identity in the United States.
- Carmen Escalante Gutierrez, Researcher, Centro Bartolomé de Las Casas: Huancauelican oral accounts of violence and authoritarianism in Peru, 1980-2000.
- Darío A. Estrin, Associate Professor, University of Buenos Aires, and Principal Researcher, CONICET: Computer simulation of heme proteins of physiopathological relevance.
- Gustavo Henrique Goldman, Professor of Molecular Biology, FCFRP, University of São Paulo: The filamentous fungus Aspergillus nidulans.
- Patrick Hamilton, Artist, Santiago, Chile, and Professor of Painting, University Diego Portales: Fine arts.
- Anwar Hasmy, Guest Researcher, National Institute of Standards and Technology, and Associate Researcher, Venezuelan Center for Computer Calculations (Cecalcula): Hardness and reactivity of noble metal nanoparticles.
- Antonio López-Ortega, Writer, Caracas, Venezuela, and General Manager, Bigott Foundation: Fiction.
- Patricia Majluf, Director, Center for Environmental Sustainability: Sustainable alternatives to restore marine ecosystems.
- Osvaldo Morrone, Independent Researcher, CONICET, and Subdirector, Instituto de Botánica Darwinion (IBODA): Systematic studies in the genus Paspalum (Poaceae).
- Ramón Elias Mujica Pinilla, President, Sociedad Peruana de Estudios Clásicos: Fine arts research.
- Marcos Novaro, Adjunct Researcher, CONICET, and Adjunct Professor, University of Buenos Aires: Human rights and democratization in Argentina, 1979-2007.
- Ana María Ochoa, Associate Professor of Music, New York University: Music, sound, and modernity in Colombia.
- Daniel Ontiveros, Artist, Buenos Aires: Fine arts.
- Ernesto Oroza, Artist, Researcher, and Designer, Aventura, Florida: The architecture of necessity.
- Sergio Raimondi, Poet, Buenos Aires, Adjunct Professor of Contemporary Literature, National University del Sur, Argentina, and Director, Museo del Puerto Ingeniero White: Poetry.
- Gregorio Carlos Rocha, Filmmaker, Morelos, Mexico: Film.
- Marco A. Romano-Silva, Associate Professor of Psychiatry, Federal University of Minas Gerais: Clinical and molecular aspects of bipolar disorder.
- Ruth Rosenstein, Professor of Human Biochemistry, University of Buenos Aires, and Principal Researcher, CONICET: Research on a cure for glaucoma.
- Analia Segal, Artist, Brooklyn, New York: Fine arts.
- Pedro Serrano, Poet, Mexico City, and Lecturer, Faculty of the Humanities, Autonomous University of Mexico: Poetry.
- Sergio Serulnikov, Adjunct Researcher, CONICET: Patricians and plebeians in late colonial Charcas.
- Daniela Spenser, Research Professor, Center for Research and Advanced Studies in Social Anthropology, Mexico City: The life and times of Vicente Lombardo Toledano.
- Laura Beatriz Steren, Independent Researcher, CONICET, and Adjunct Professor, Instituto Balseiro: Spin-polarized transport phenomena in artificial magnetic nanostructures.
- Oscar Strasnoy, Composer, Paris, France: Music composition.
- Perla Suez, Writer, Córdoba, Argentina: Fiction.
- John Joseph Sullivan Hendricks, Research Professor, Autonomous University of Zacatecas: A monolingual Huastecan Nahuatl dictionary.
- Alexey Puig Taran, Choreographer, Caracas, Venezuela: Choreography.
- Aparecida Vilaça, Associate Professor of Social Anthropology, National Museum, Federal University of Rio de Janeiro: Conversion and Christianity in native lowland South America.
- Lila Zemborain, Poet, New York City, and Clinical Professor, Department of Spanish and Portuguese, New York University: Poetry.

== See also ==
- Guggenheim Fellowship
