= Sabato =

Sabato may refer to:

- Sabato (surname)
- Sabato (river), a river in southern Italy
- Sabato (Tenchi Muyo!), a fictional character in the Tenchi Muyo! series
- Sabato Morais (1823-1897), Italian-American rabbi
- Instituto Sabato
- Saturday, in Italian
- Sabato (magazine), Belgian magazine
