= Rennan Barkana =

Israeli theoretical astrophysicist and cosmologist

- רנן ברקנא
- Born: October 9, 1973 (age 52); Haifa, Israel
- Education: University of Pennsylvania, Massachusetts Institute of Technology
- Known for: Research on the first stars and dark matter
- Awards: Guggenheim Fellowship (2007)
- Scientific career
- Fields: Astrophysics, Cosmology
- Workplaces: Tel Aviv University
- Doctoral advisor: Edmund Bertschinger
- Doctoral students: Smadar Naoz, Anastasia Fialkov

Rennan Barkana (Hebrew: רנן ברקנא; born October 9, 1973) is an Israeli theoretical astrophysicist and cosmologist who is a full professor at Tel Aviv University and was formerly the head of the astrophysics department at the School of Physics and Astronomy. He is an expert in the study of the first stars and dark matter.

== Biography ==
Rennan Barkana was born in Haifa, Israel. He completed his undergraduate studies in physics and mathematics at the University of Pennsylvania, graduating summa cum laude in 1993. He completed a Ph.D. in physics at MIT in 1997, at age 23, supervised by Edmund Bertschinger, with a thesis on gravitational lensing as a probe of dark matter and gravitational waves. Barkana held postdoctoral positions at the Institute for Advanced Study in Princeton (IAS) and the Canadian Institute for Theoretical Astrophysics (CITA). He joined the School of Physics and Astronomy at Tel Aviv University in 2001, becoming a full professor in 2015. He was the head of the astrophysics department in 2016–2020.

He has been a visiting researcher at institutions including the University of Oxford, Caltech, the University of Tokyo, the Perimeter Institute for Theoretical Physics (PI), and UC Santa Cruz.

== Research ==
Barkana has authored over 100 papers with more than 10,000 citations. His doctoral students include Prof. Smadar Naoz of UCLA and Prof. Anastasia Fialkov of the University of Cambridge. His research focuses on the formation and evolution of the first stars, developing models to predict the properties of galaxies with early stars, and studying 21 cm radio waves from hydrogen atoms. Barkana’s work has shown that velocity differences between gas and dark matter caused the first stars to create patterns of large concentrations and star-free regions. He also discovered that the universe warmed later than expected and proposed that dark matter might have cooled the early cosmic gas, suggesting a potential direct detection of dark matter.

== Awards and honors ==
- Alon Fellowship (2001)
- Guggenheim Fellowship (2007)
- Moore Distinguished Scholar at Caltech (2008)
- Leverhulme Visiting Professor in the UK (2015–2016)
- Lagrange Prize from Institut d'Astrophysique de Paris (2015)
- Distinguished Visiting Professor at UC Santa Cruz (2022)

== Personal life ==
Barkana is married to Riki and has two daughters. He resides in Ramat Gan, plays chess with an American (USCF) rating of 1900, enjoys scuba diving, and has played the violin since childhood.

== Selected Articles ==
- Hu, W., Barkana, R., & Gruzinov, A. "Fuzzy cold dark matter: the wave properties of ultralight particles." Physical Review Letters 85.6 (2000): 1158.
- Barkana, R., & Loeb, A. "In the beginning: the first sources of light and the reionization of the universe." Physics reports 349.2 (2001): 125-238.
- Barkana, R. "Possible interaction between baryons and dark-matter particles revealed by the first stars." Nature 555.7694 (2018): 71-74.
- Loeb, A., & Barkana, R. "The reionization of the universe by the first stars and quasars." Annual review of astronomy and astrophysics 39.1 (2001): 19-66.
- Barkana, R., & Loeb, A. "The photoevaporation of dwarf galaxies during reionization." The Astrophysical Journal 523.1 (1999): 54.
- Barkana, R., & Loeb, A. "Unusually large fluctuations in the statistics of galaxy formation at high redshift." The Astrophysical Journal 609.2 (2004): 474.
- Barkana, R., & Loeb, A. "A method for separating the physics from the astrophysics of high-redshift 21 centimeter fluctuations." The Astrophysical Journal 624.2 (2005): L65.
- Barkana, R., & Loeb, A. "Detecting the earliest galaxies through two new sources of 21 centimeter fluctuations." The Astrophysical Journal 626.1 (2005): 1.
- Barkana, R., Haiman, Z., & Ostriker, J.P. "Constraints on warm dark matter from cosmological reionization." The Astrophysical Journal 558.2 (2001): 482.
- A. Fialkov, R. Barkana, and E. Visbal. "The observable signature of late heating of the Universe during cosmic reionization". Nature, 506, 197 (2014).
- E. Visbal, R. Barkana, A. Fialkov, D. Tseliakhovich, and Chris Hirata. "The signature of the first stars in atomic hydrogen at redshift 20". Nature, 487, 70 (2012).

== Book ==
- The Encyclopedia of Cosmology, Volume 1: Galaxy Formation and Evolution, World Scientific Series in Astrophysics, World Scientific Publishing Co, 2018 (with Shinji Tsujikawa and Jihn E Kim).
