= Sabato triangle =

The Sábato triangle (Spanish: Triángulo de Sabato) is a model concerned with linkages between science, industry and government, which has informed discussions of science policy throughout Latin America. It was developed during the 1960s and 1970s by the Argentine physicist and metallurgist Jorge Alberto Sábato, of the National Atomic Energy Commission (CNEA, the Argentine government agency overseeing development of nuclear power in the country).

== Brief description ==
The idea of the triangle was proposed by John Kenneth Galbraith and developed by Sábato as a model of policy-making in science and technology. The model is based on the concept that in order for a scientific-technological system to exist in practice it is necessary for three sectors to be strongly linked together over the long term: the State (which formulates and implements policy); the scientific and technological infrastructure (which provides technology); and the productive sector (which uses technology). These interrelationships are portrayed in the form of a triangle.

Further, each "vertex" needs to have strong internal relations, that is to say, relations between the different institutions contained within itself. For example, within the State there needs to be coherence between "implicit" policy and "explicit" policy, between different ministries and autonomous organizations, and so on. The other factor considered is the external relations between the "vertices" and outside entities.

The triangle has been used to shed light on technological dependency. The model predicts that the stronger the external relations, the weaker or non-existent will be the interrelationships and the internal relations, and this will delay the country in reducing its dependency.

== Impact ==
The Sábato Triangle won acceptance in several countries of Latin America, having an effect upon science and technology policy there and disseminating the belief that the State had an important role in promoting technology transfer. However, a separation of the three components of the "triangle" has still been observed in more recent times.

== See also ==
- Jorge A. Sábato institute
