= Angela Chan =

American fashion designer

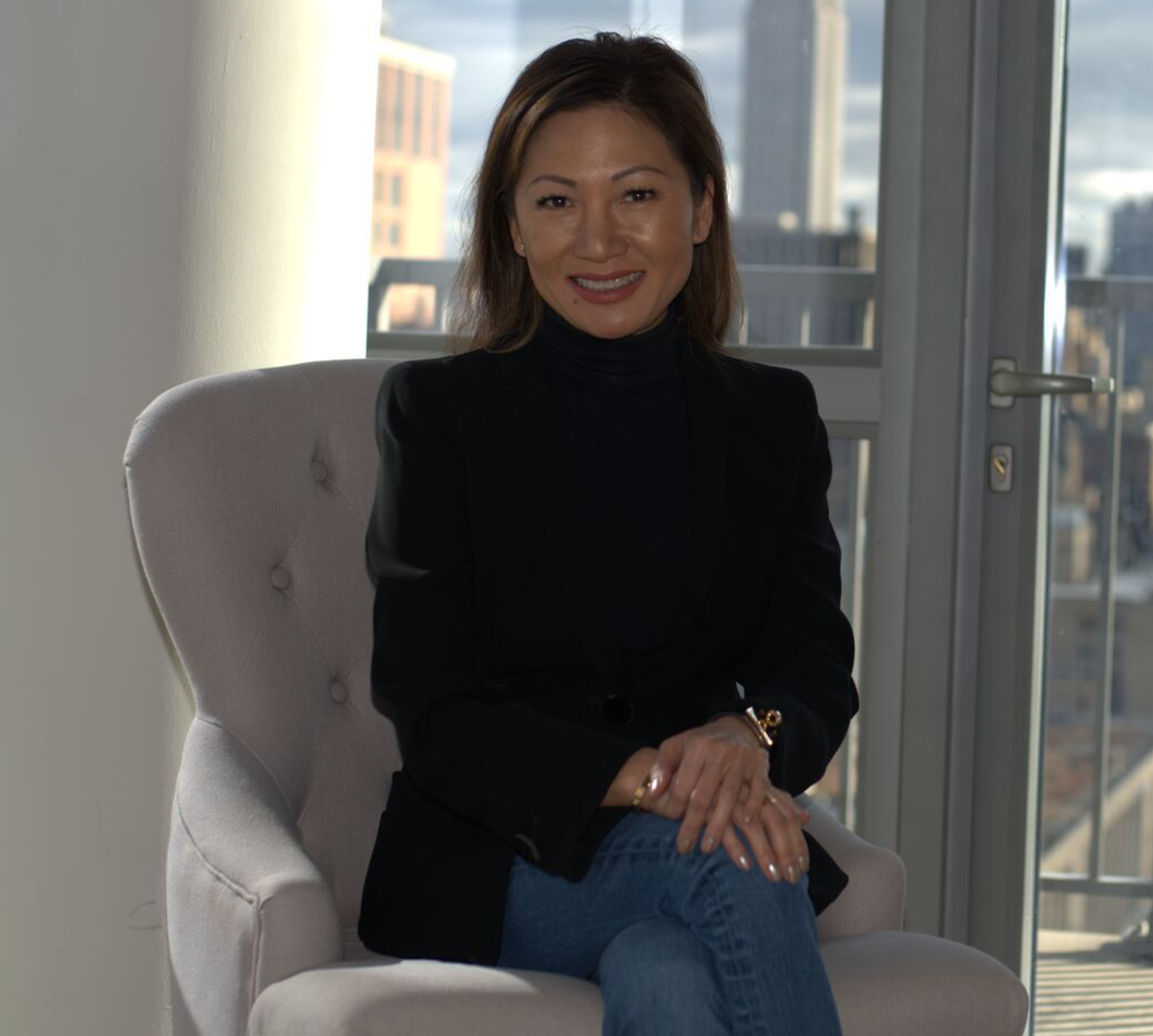
- Photo of Angela Chan
- Born: January 21, 1967 (age 59); United States
- Occupation: Fashion designer

Angela Chan (born January 21, 1967; also known as Angela Chew) is an American fashion designer who is currently the President of Chargeurs' PCC Technologies. Chan is known for founding Mommy Chic Maternity and the International Design & Trade company. As an advocate of sustainability, she has also founded the Sustainable 50 Initiative.

In addition, she is a Forbes contributor and is also a featured columnist for the Sourcing Journal.

== Early life and education ==
Chan graduated from Pratt Institute with a Bachelor of Fine Arts Degree.

== Career ==
In 1998, Chan founded Mommy Chic Maternity, the maternity and children's [SY1] brand that was utilized by celebrities such as Uma Thurman and Catherine Zeta-Jones. Mommy Chic Maternity was mentioned in the book Invisible Eden: A Story of Love and Murder on Cape Cod by Maria Flook.

Chan worked as a manager at Macy's from 1989-1994. From 1995-2007, she worked in womenswear, menswear, and childrenswear for Calvin Klein, The Limited, Elie Tahari and Victoria's Secret, Rocawear, Gerson Lehrman Group, and many other companies. She worked at Destination XL Group from 2009-2018.

In 2018, Chan became the Global President of Chargeurs. At Chargeurs, she has initiated fashion school partnerships with FIT and Parsons School of Design, founded Chargeurs Foundation in 2018, and founded the Sustainable 50 initiative. She founded Lainiere Health & Wellness, USA in 2020.

== Awards and recognition ==
She was the winner of the Fresh Face Designer award from Women’s Wear Daily in 2002.

In January 2017, she was recognized as a Top Women in Retail Tech.

In 2020, she was named one of the Most Influential DealMakeHers and awarded The Women of Inspiration Award by Delivering Good.

== See also ==
- Chargeurs
