= So-hyun =

- Hangul: 소현
- RR: Sohyeon
- MR: Sohyŏn

So-hyun is a Korean given name.

People with this name include:

- SoHyun Bae (born 1965), South Korean-born American painter
- Park So-hyun (born 1971), South Korean actress
- Kim So-hyun (actress, born 1975), South Korean actress
- Kwon So-hyun (actress) (born 1987), South Korean actress
- Cho So-hyun (born 1988), South Korean football player
- Kwon So-hyun (born 1994), South Korean singer, former member of 4Minute
- Kim So-hyun (born 1999), South Korean actress
- An So-hyun (born 2001), South Korean figure skater
- Park So-hyun (tennis) (born 2002), South Korean tennis player
- Park So-hyun (singer, born 2002), South Korean singer, member of girl group TripleS

Fictional characters:

- Oh So-hyun from 2020 TV series 18 Again

== See also ==
- Crown Prince Sohyeon (birth name I Wang; 1612–1645), first son of King Injo of Joseon
- List of Korean given names
