= Jose Rodolfo =

Jose Rodolfo or José Rodolfo may refer to:

- José Rodolfo Chessani (born 1998), Mexican Paralympic athlete
- Jose Rodolfo Galvele (1937–2011), Argentine chemist
- José Rodolfo Pires Ribeiro (born 1992), Brazilian professional footballer
- José Rodolfo Reyes (born 1988), Mexican former professional footballer
- José Rodolfo Serpa Pérez (born 1979), Colombian road racing cyclist
- Jose Rodolfo Villarreal-Hernandez (born 1978), Mexican drug cartel boss and former fugitive
- José Rodolfo Zelaya (born 1968), Honduran politician
