= Andrea Giunta =

Argentine art historian and curator

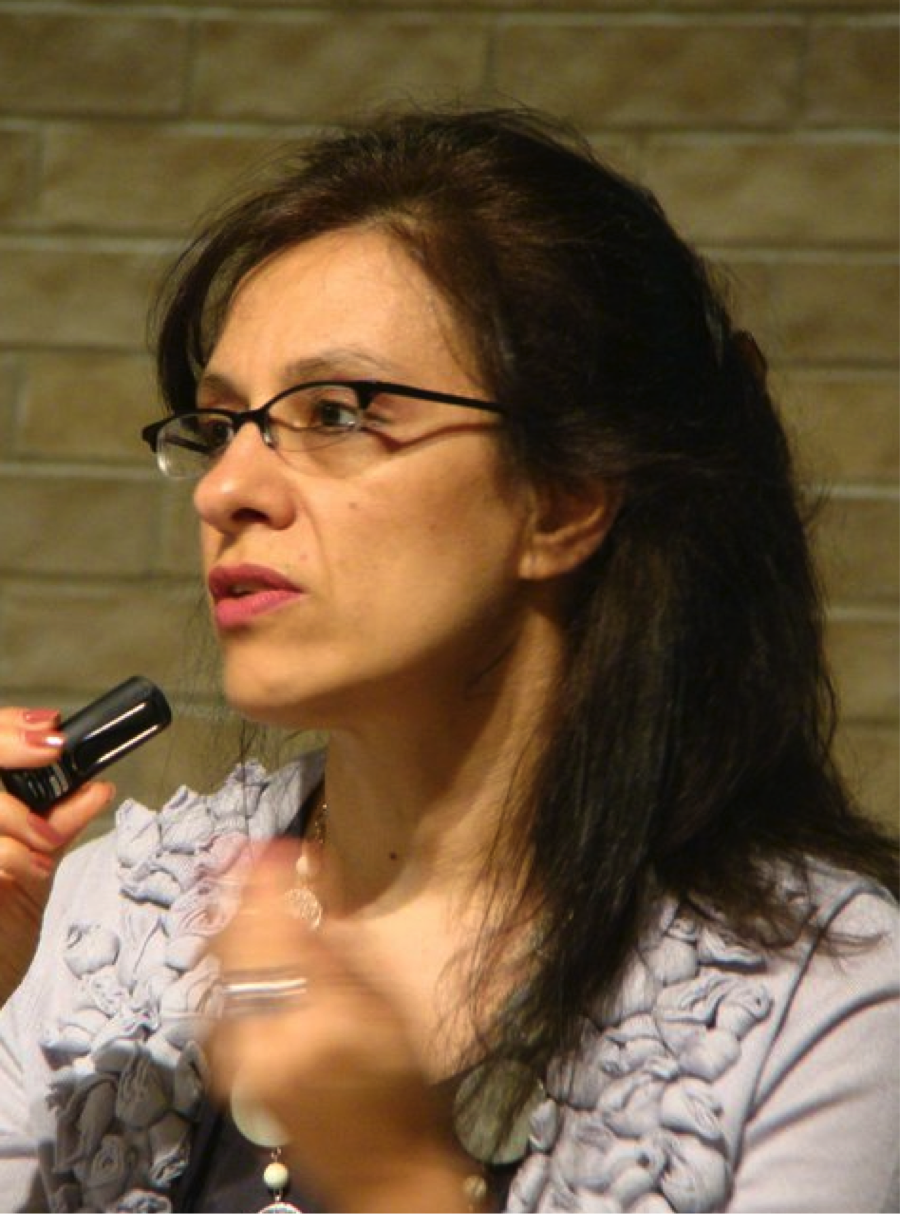
- Born: Andrea Graciela Giunta; 5 May 1960 (age 66); Buenos Aires, Argentina
- Education: University of Buenos Aires
- Occupations: Historian, professor, curator
- Employer: University of Buenos Aires
- Awards: Guggenheim Fellowship (2002); Konex Award (2004, 2006, 2016); Wittenborn Book Award (2017)

Andrea Graciela Giunta (born 5 May 1960) is an Argentine art historian, professor, researcher, and curator.

== Biography ==
Andrea Giunta completed her secondary studies at the Instituto Tierra Santa and the Escuela Normal Superior No. 4 in Buenos Aires.

She graduated with a licentiate in art history from the Faculty of Philosophy and Letters at the University of Buenos Aires (UBA), where she also obtained her PhD in philosophy with a specialization in arts.

She received fellowships from the National Gallery of Art's Center for Advanced Study in the Visual Arts, the Getty Foundation, and the John Simon Guggenheim Memorial Foundation.

She was the founding director of the Center for Documentation, Research, and Publications (CeDIP) at the Centro Cultural Recoleta of Buenos Aires (2006–2007) and a member of the advisory committee that directed the National Museum of Fine Arts (2006–2007).

In 2006, Giunta received a Harrington Fellowship from the University of Texas at Austin, where she was Chair in Latin American Art History and Criticism and founding director of the Center for Latin American Visual Studies (CLAVIS) from 2009 to 2013. In this position she directed three conferences for emerging researchers in art studies in Latin America.

From 2013 to 2015, she was founding director of the National University of General San Martín's Experimental Art Center. Since 2014 she has been a member of the Artistic Scientific Committee at the Latin American Art Museum of Buenos Aires (MALBA).

She has received the Konex Award on three occasions – once in Literature (2004) and twice in Humanities (2006, 2016).

She has been a visiting professor at Duke University (1998 and 2000), the University of Monterrey (2000–2001), the School for Advanced Studies in the Social Sciences (2014), the National Autonomous University of Mexico (2016), and was Tinker Visiting Professor at Columbia University (2017). She has given lectures at museums such as the National Museum of Fine Arts, MALBA, the New York Museum of Modern Art, the Bahnhof Museum in Berlin, the Haus der Kunst in Munich, and the Museo Reina Sofía in Madrid. She has been a guest lecturer at numerous institutions including Harvard University, UC Berkeley, the Art Institute of Chicago, Princeton University, and New York University.

Giunta's research work focuses on Argentine, Latin American, and international art from the postwar period to the present. The axis of her contributions lies in the power of images, their political uses, as well as in the debates they provoke in different contexts. In this sense, she has analyzed the internationalization processes of Argentine and Latin American art in the context of the Cold War in its Latin American theater, characterized by the Cuban Revolution, the Cuban Missile Crisis, and the Alliance for Progress. She has also examined the controversies that the works of artist León Ferrari produced within the Argentine church, and made a particular study of Guernica by Pablo Picasso, and the power that the work has built in its tours of different museums and galleries of the world. Her research also deals with the visual strategies of images in relation to human rights and dictatorships, particularly in Argentina. She has developed research on gender studies since the early 1990s, and has included a feminist perspective since the 2010 exhibit Radical Women. Latin American Art, 1960-1985 (Hammer Museum and Brooklyn Museum, 2017, Pinacoteca do Estado de São Paulo, 2018).

In her publications, the concept of "simultaneous avant-gardes" – as opposed to "peripheral" or "decentralized" avant-gardes – is central, referring to such artistic movements since 1945 in different metropolises of the world. These include the "emancipation of bodies", referring to the process produced by feminists artists from the 1960s to the 1980s, the "mobile monument-memorial", conceptualizing Picasso's Guernica, and "manifest images", analyzing the power of images in the modern art of Latin America.

Giunta has curated national and international exhibitions, including Radical Women. Latin American Art, 1960-1985 (co-curated with Cecilia Fajardo-Hill), Verboamérica (co-curated with Agustín Pérez Rubio), Extranjeros en la cultura y en la tecnología (co-curated with Néstor García Canclini), León Ferrari. Obras 1976–2008 (co-curated with Liliana Piñeiro), León Ferrari Retrospectiva, 1954–2004, and [en tránsito] señales presentes (co-curated with Paloma Porrás).

She works as the principal investigator of Argentina's National Scientific and Technical Research Council (CONICET), a Regular Full Professor of Modern and Contemporary Latin American Art (History of American Art II), and Regular Associate Professor of Modern and Contemporary International Art (History of the Plastic Arts VI) at UBA's Faculty of Philosophy and Letters. She is a researcher at UBA's Interdisciplinary Institute for Gender Studies (IIEGE).

== Awards ==
- 1989 Jorge Feinsilber Biennial Art Critics' Award, Jorge Feinsilber Foundation, Buenos Aires
- 1991 Argentine Art Critics' Association, best essay of the year
- 1994 Award for scientific production, University of Buenos Aires
- 2001 Argentine Art Critics' Association, best essay of the year
- 2002 Argentine Art Critics' Association, best book of the year for Vanguardia, internacionalismo y política. Arte argentino en los sesenta
- 2002 Arvey Foundation Book Award from the Association for Latin American Art for Vanguardia, internacionalismo y política. Arte argentino en los sesenta
- 2004 Konex Award for Literature – Art Essay
- 2005 Argentine Art Critics' Association, best book of the year and best exhibition of the year for León Ferrari. Retrospectiva. Obras 1954–2004
- 2006 Konex Award for Humanities – Aesthetics, Theory, and History of Art
- 2008 Triannual recognition of the University of Buenos Aires
- 2016 Konex Award for Humanities – Aesthetics, Theory, and History of Art
- 2017 Recognition of the University of Buenos Aires
- 2017 George Wittenborn Memorial Book Award from the Art Libraries Society of North America

== Publications ==
- Cultura y política en los años '60 (Co-ed, et al.), Instituto de Investigaciones Gino Germani, University of Buenos Aires Faculty of Social Sciences, 1997, ISBN 9789502903750
- Goeritz/Romero Brest. Correspondencias, Instituto de Teoría en Investigaciones Estéticas "Julio E. Payró", University of Buenos Aires Faculty of Philosophy and Letters, 2000
- Vanguardia, internacionalismo y política. Arte argentino en los sesenta, Paidós, Buenos Aires-Barcelona, 2001, 2003, ISBN 9789501265224
- Jorge Romero Brest. Escritos I (1928–1939) (Co-ed, et al.), University of Buenos Aires Faculty of Philosophy and Letters, Buenos Aires, 2004, ISBN 9789502907710
- Listen, here, now! Argentine art in the 1960s: Argentine art in the 1960s: writings of the avant-garde (Co-ed. Inés Katszenstein), Museum of Modern Art, New York, 2004, ISBN 9780870703669
- León Ferrari. Restrospectiva 1954–2004 (Ed.), Centro Cultural Recoleta-MALBA-Colección Costantini, 2004
- Candido Portinari y el sentido social del arte (Ed.), Siglo XXI, Buenos Aires, 2005, ISBN 9789871220144
- Arte de posguerra. Jorge Romero Brest y la revista Ver y Estimar, (Co-ed. Laura Malosetti Costa, Paidós, Buenos Aires, 2005, ISBN 9789501265514
- León Ferrari. Retrospectiva, obras 1954–2006 (Ed.), Cosacnaify, Sao Paulo, 2006, ISBN 9788575035597
- Avant-Garde, Internationalism, and Politics: Argentine Art in the Sixties, Duke University Press, Durham & London, 2007, ISBN 9781283023160
- El caso Ferrari: arte, censura y libertad de expresión en la retrospectiva de León Ferrari en el Centro Cultural Recoleta 2004–2005, Licopodio, Buenos Aires, 2008, ISBN 9789872056964
- León Ferrari, Works 1976–2008 (Ed.), Editorial RM, Mexico City, 2008, ISBN 9788492480241
- Vanguardia, internacionalismo y política. Arte argentino en los años sesenta (revised and expanded edition), Siglo XXI, Buenos Aires, 2008, 2015, ISBN 9789876290562
- El Guernica de Picasso. El poder de la representación: Europa, Estados Unidos y América Latina (Ed.), Biblos, Buenos Aires, 2009, ISBN 9789507867705
- Exposiciones de arte argentino, 1956–2006: la confluencia de historiadores, curadores e instituciones en la escritura de la historia, AAMNBA, Buenos Aires, 2009, ISBN 9789871428038
- Poscrisis. Arte argentino después del 2001, Siglo XXI, Buenos Aires, 2009, ISBN 9789876290814
- Objetos mutantes: sobre arte contemporáneo, Palinodia, Santiago, 2010, ISBN 9789568438289
- Escribir las imaǵenes: ensayos sobre arte argentino y latinoamericano, Siglo XXI, Buenos Aires, 2011, ISBN 9789876291811
- ¿Cuándo empieza el arte contemporáneo? = When does the contemporary art begin?, ArteBA, Buenos Aires, 2014, ISBN 9789872802332
- Verboamérica (with Agustín Pérez Rubio), Buenos Aires, MALBA, 2016, ISBN 9789874615442
- Radical Women. Latin American Art, 1960–1985 (with Cecilia Fajardo-Hill), Prestel-Hammer Museum, 2017, ISBN 9783791356808
- Feminismo y arte latinoamericano. Historias de artistas que emanciparon los cuerpos, Buenos Aires, Siglo XXI, 2018, ISBN 9789876298230
