= Laura Malosetti Costa =

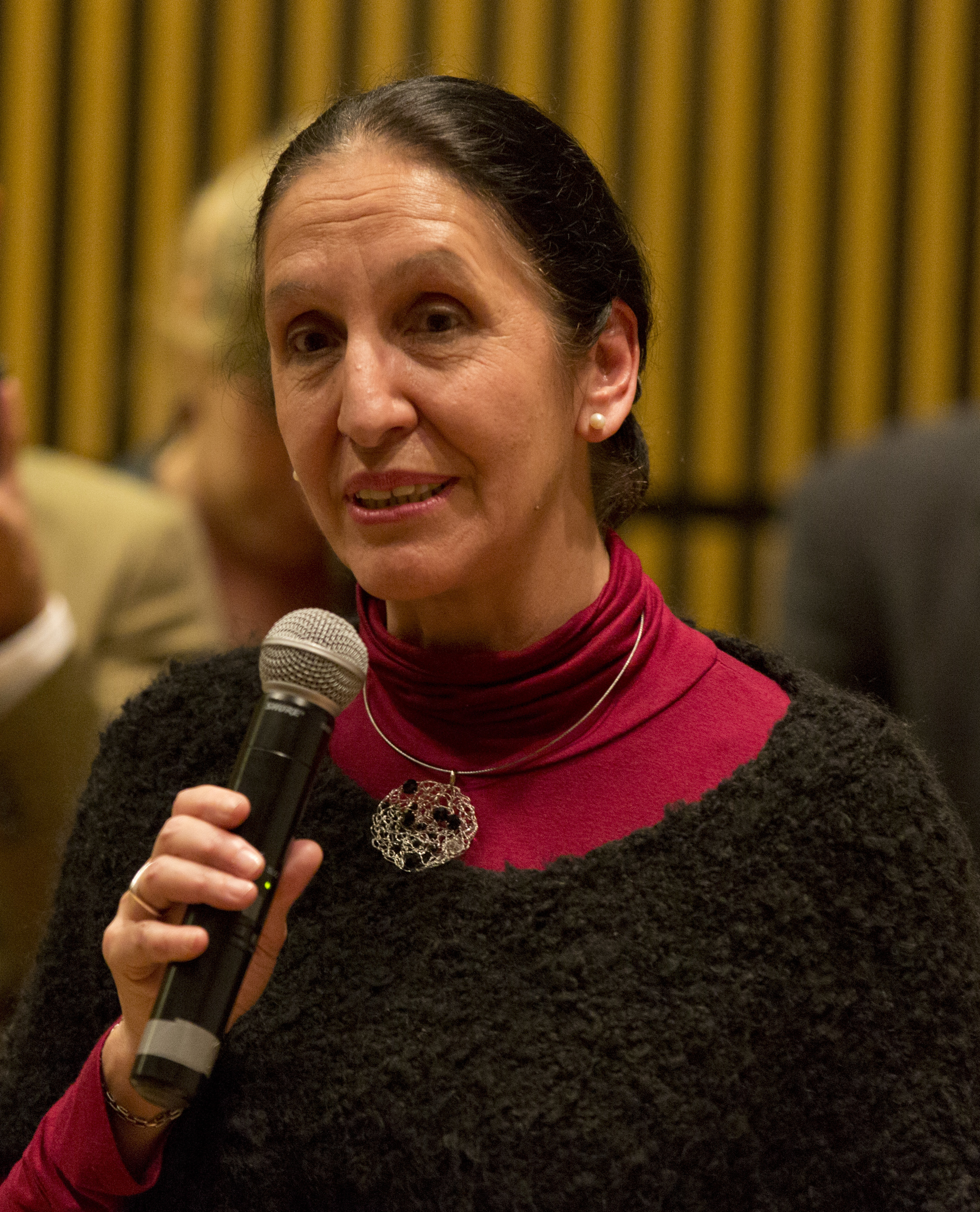
- Born: 30 March 1956 (age 70); Montevideo, Uruguay
- Other name: Laura Malosetti-Costa
- Education: University of Buenos Aires
- Occupations: Academic, curator, writer
- Employers: CONICET; UNSAM
- Awards: Konex Award (2006, 2016)

Laura Malosetti Costa (born 30 March 1956) is a Uruguayan-born Argentine social and cultural anthropologist, researcher, art historian, and essayist. She is also a curator of art exhibitions and the author of several books on Latin American art. She was recognized with the Konex Award in 2006 and 2016.

== Career ==
Laura Malosetti Costa was born 30 March 1956 in Montevideo, Uruguay. She completed a doctorate at the University of Buenos Aires.

She is a member of the Argentine National Academy of Fine Arts. She works as a researcher at the National Scientific and Technical Research Council (CONICET), and is director of the Institute of Arts of the National University of General San Martín (UNSAM). She is also UNSAM's director of the Master's Degree in History of Argentine and Latin American Art.

== Works ==
- Los primeros modernos. Arte y sociedad en Buenos Aires a fines del siglo XIX [The First Moderns. Art and Society in Buenos Aires at the End of the 19th Century] (1st ed.). Fondo de Cultura Económica. 2001. ISBN 978-950-557-425-4.
- Arte de posguerra [Post-war Art] (1st ed.). Paidós. 2005. ISBN 978-950-12-6551-4. Co-author with Andrea Giunta.
- Enseñanza de la historia y memoria compartida [Teaching History and Shared Memory] (1st ed.). Paidós. 2005. ISBN 978-950-12-6549-1. Collective work.
- Fermín Eguía (1st ed.). Cecilia Moguilansky Ediciones. 2005. ISBN 978-987-21269-1-9.
- Buenos Aires, ciudad y país [Buenos Aires, City and Country] (1st ed.). Asociación de Amigos del Museo Histórico Sarmiento. 2006. ISBN 978-987-97693-1-7. Collective work.
- Collivadino (1st ed.). El Ateneo. 2006. ISBN 978-950-02-5937-8.
- Educar la mirada – Políticas y pedagogías de la imagen [Educating the View – Policies and Pedagogies of the Image] (1st ed.). Manantial. 2006. ISBN 978-987-500-099-5. Collective work.
- Pampa, ciudad y suburbio (1st ed.). Fundación OSDE. 2007. ISBN 978-987-9358-28-3.
- Revistas ilustradas [Illustrated Journals] (1st ed.). Universidad Nacional de las Artes. 2007. ISBN 978-987-20587-5-3. Co-author with Marcela Gene.
- Cuadros de viaje - Artistas argentinos en Europa y Estados Unidos 1880–1910 [Travel Paintings – Argentine Artists in Europe and the United States 1880–1910] (1st ed.). Fondo de Cultura Económica. 2008. ISBN 978-950-557-779-8. Compiler.
- Impresiones porteñas – Imagen y palabra en la historia cultural de Buenos Aires [Impressions of Buenos Aires – Image and Word in the Cultural History of Buenos Aires] (1st ed.). Edhasa. 2009. ISBN 978-987-628-049-5. Compiled in collaboration with Marcela Gene.
- Torres García – Utopía y tradición (1st ed.). National University of Tres de Febrero. 2011. ISBN 978-987-1172-74-0. Co-author with Gabriel Peluffo Linari.
- Atrapados por la imagen – Arte y política en la cultura impresa argentina [Caught By the Image – Art and Politics in Argentina's Printed Culture] (1st ed.). Edhasa. 2013. ISBN 978-987-628-214-7. Co-author with Marcela Gene.
- Doscientos años de pintura argentina [Two Hundred Years of Argentine Painting] (1st ed.). Banco Hipotecario. 2013. ISBN 978-987-29989-1-2.
- Entresiglos – El impulso cosmopolita en Rosario [Between Centuries – The Cosmopolitan Impulse in Rosario] (1st ed.). Ediciones Castagnino/Macro. 2013. ISBN 978-987-29180-3-3. Co-author with María de la Paz López Carvajal and Pablo Montini.
- Eduardo Sívori (1st ed.). Aguilar, Altea, Taurus, Alfaguara. 2014. ISBN 978-987-04-3676-8. Co-author with Cristina Rossi.
- Yo, nosotros, el arte [I, We, Art] (1st ed.). Fundación OSDE. 2014. ISBN 978-987-9358-82-5. Co-author with María Isabel Baldasarre.
- La seducción fatal – Imaginarios eróticos del siglo XIX [Fatal Seduction – 19th Century Erotic Notions] (1st ed.). Asociación Amigos del Museo Nacional de Bellas Artes. 2014. ISBN 978-987-1428-25-0.
- El Riachuelo de Benito Quinquela Martín [The Stream of Benito Quinquela] (1st ed.). ACUMAR. 2015. ISBN 978-987-46101-0-2. Collective work.
- Ernesto de la Cárcova (1st ed.). Asociación Amigos del Museo Nacional de Bellas Artes. 2016. ISBN 978-987-1428-33-5.
- Genealogías críticas de la colonialidad en América Latina, África, Oriente [Critical Genealogies of Coloniality in Latin America, Africa, Orient] (1st ed.). CLACSO. 2016. ISBN 978-987-722-157-2. Collective work.
- Retratos de revolución y guerra – Gil de Castro en el Museo Histórico Nacional de Argentina [Portraits of Revolution and War – Gil de Castro in the National Historical Museum of Argentina] (1st ed.). UNSAMedita. 2017. ISBN 978-987-4027-58-0. Collective work.
- Los de abajo [Those Below] (1st ed.). UNR Editora. 2018. ISBN 978-987-702-274-2. Collective work.

== Awards and recognitions ==
- FIAAR Award from Telefónica for art history research, 1998
- Honorable Mention of the Latin American Association of Art, 2003
- Best Book of the Year from the Argentine Association of Art Critics, 2006
- Konex Award Diploma of Merit for Aesthetics, Theory, and Art History, 2006
- Curator's Prize for Exhibition, Argentine Association of Art Critics, 2007
- Juror for the National Production Awards, 2013
- Konex Jury Award for Humanities, 2016
