= Sabato (surname) =

Sabato is an Italian surname. Notable people with the surname include:

- Aaron Sabato (born 1999), American baseball player
- Antonio Sabàto Sr. (1943–2021), Italian actor
- Antonio Sabato (footballer) (born 1958), Italian football player
- Antonio Sabàto Jr. (born 1972), American actor and model
- Ernesto Sabato (1911–2011), Argentine writer
- Haim Sabato (born 1952), Israeli rabbi and writer
- Jorge Sabato (1924–1983), Argentine metallurgist
- Larry Sabato (born 1952), political analyst
- Mario Sabato (1945–2023), Argentine film director and screenplay writer
- Rocco Sabato (born 1982), Italian football player
