= Margaret Crawford =

Urban planner and professor

Margaret Lee Crawford (9 March 1948) is an urban planner, architectural historian and professor at the University of California, Berkeley.

She is a specialist in urban development in the United States and China, and she is one of the leading experts on the urban and social transformations of the suburbs in North America. In her studies, Crawford emphasizes the new uses and revitalization that these suburban areas have seen in recent decades, which is leading to a territorial rebalancing with respect to city centres, historically the main focal points of urban life. She has co-edited various monographs, including two editions of Everyday Urbanism (with John Chase and John Kaliski, The Monacelli Press, 1999 and 2008), which introduced and consolidated the concept of Everyday Urbanism, and Urbanization in China (with Marco Cenzatti, Routledge, 2017). She collaborated on the books Making Suburbia: New Histories of Everyday America (University Of Minnesota Press, 2015) and The Suburb Reader (Routledge, 2006). She is also the author of the book Building the Workingman's Paradise: The History of American Company Towns (Verso, 1995), a study of towns built by companies and factories to house workers from the late 18th to the early 20th centuries, and The Car and the City: Automobile, The Built Environment and Daily Urban Life (The University of Michigan Press, 1991). She was awarded with a Guggenheim Fellowship in 2007.
