= Diango Hernández =

Cuban artist (born 1970)

Diango Hernández Torres
- Born: 1970 (age 55–56); Sancti Spíritus, Cuba
- Spouse: Anne Pöhlmann
- Website: olaismo.com

Diango Hernández (born 1970) is a Cuban artist, known for his paintings. From 1994 to 2003, Hernández was involved with Ordo Amoris Cabinet, which he co-founded with Ernesto Oroza, Juan Bernal, Francis Acea and Manuel Piña. He is married to artist Anne Pöhlmann. He lives and works between Düsseldorf, Germany and Havana.

== Biography ==
Diango Hernández was born in Sancti Spíritus, Cuba in 1970. His mother was a high school teacher—and later professor—and his father was an engineer. He attended boarding school in the countryside as a teenager, going on to study at the Havana Superior Institute of Design (ISDI) from 1989 to 1994 where he received a degree in industrial design. After a brief stint at an architecture firm, he went on to form a collaboration experience together with Ernesto Oroza, Juan Bernal, Francis Acea and Manuel Piña under the name of Ordo Amoris Cabinet (OAC; Latin, Order of Love). From 1996 until 2003 Ordo Amoris Cabinet comprised only Hernández and Francis Acea. The group created sculptural installations which incorporated various research methodologies to address social and cultural issues in Cuba. They exhibited widely throughout the Americas and Europe, and disbanded in 2003. It was at this time that Hernández left Cuba for Europe.

Hernández's first solo show after OAC's dissolution took place at Frehrking Wiesehöfer in Cologne. Entitled Amateur, it consisted of over 2,000 drawings created during his time in Cuba, which explored his everyday life and thoughts and mediated on the fragility and immediateness that drawing allows. Throughout his practice, Hernández has continued to explore fragility and incompleteness across various mediums.

His work draws heavily from his experiences and upbringing in Cuba and the culture of revolution. In 2006, for instance, Hernández had three shows entitled Spies (at Alexander and Bonin in New York), Traitors (at Pepe Cobo in Madrid), and Revolution (at Kunsthalle Basel) which he describes as "meticulously connected...the words 'revolution', 'spies' and 'traitors' are in the first place very familiar words or concepts to me and to my generation. All three of them have been repeated, printed and amplified millions of times by the Cuban officials...I wanted to take these big monumental words into my hands; I wanted to domesticate them. In Cuba printed or amplified politics can only be stopped if we shut our front door and switch off the radio and this is somehow what I did with these series of exhibitions; I finally moved from the streets to my living room."

Hernández’s works has been included at the 51st Venice Art Biennale (Arsenale, 2005), São Paulo Art Biennial (2006), Biennale of Sydney (2006), Kunsthalle Basel (2006), Munich’s Haus der Kunst (2010), London’s Hayward Gallery (2010) and more recently with a survey at the MART in Rovereto, Italy, (2011). Hernández currently lives and works in Düsseldorf, Germany.

== Collections ==
- Inhotim Centro de Arte Contemporânea, Belo Horizonte
- FRAC des Pays de la Loire, Carquefou
- Museo de Arte Contemporáneo de Castilla y León, (MUSAC)
- Colección Bergé, Madrid
- Rheingold Collection, Mönchengladbach
- Städtisches Museum Abteiberg, Mönchengladbach
- Museum of Modern Art, New York
- Kunstmuseum Liechtenstein, Vaduz

== Selected bibliography ==
- Kreuzer, Stefanie, ed. Theoretical Beach. Distanz Verlag, Berlin, 2016 ISBN 978-3954761616
- Diango Hernández: The Book of Waves. ex cat. Marlborough Contemporary, London, 2015 ISBN 978-1909693142
- Vermeulen, Timotheus and Gerhard Obermüller. Socialist Nature, ex. cat. Berlin: Distanz Verlag, 2014 ISBN 978-3954760855
- Diango Hernández: The New Man and the New Woman, ex. cat. London: Marlborough Contemporary, 2013 ISBN 978-1909693043
- Diango Hernández. Living Rooms, a Survey, ex. cat. Rovereto/Trento, Italy: Museo di Arte Moderna e Contemporánea di Trento e Rovereto, 2011 ISBN 978-8836622115
- Hernández, Diango. Home. New York: Alexander and Bonin Publishing, Inc., 2011 ISBN 978-0615526270
- Diango Hernández: Diamonds and Stones, My Education. ex cat. Wizard Gallery, Milan, 2008 ISBN 978-8862080804
