= Christopher Buckley (poet) =

American poet

- Born: 1948 (age 77–78); Arcata, California, U.S.
- Education: St. Mary's College (B.A.); San Diego State University (M.A.); University of California, Irvine (M.F.A.)
- Occupation: Poet

Christopher Buckley (born 1948) is an American poet.

Buckley was born in Arcata, California. He graduated from St. Mary's College with a BA, San Diego State University with a MA, and University of California, Irvine with an MFA. He taught at Fresno State University, University of California, Santa Barbara, Murray State University, West Chester University, and University of California, Riverside.

He married painter Nadya Brown.

== Awards ==
- 2007 Guggenheim Fellowship
- Fulbright Award in Creative Writing
- four Pushcart Prizes
- 2001 and 1984 NEA grants in poetry

== Works ==
- Blossoms & Bones: On the Life and Work of Georgia O'Keeffe, Vanderbilt University Press, 1988, ISBN 0826512321
- Blue autumn: poems, Copper Beech Press, 1990, ISBN 9780914278535
- Dark matter: poems, Copper Beech Press, 1993, ISBN 9780914278627
- Star Apocrypha, Northwestern University Press, 2001, ISBN 978-0-8101-5113-0
- Greatest hits, 1978-2000, Pudding House Publications, 2001, ISBN 978-1-930755-49-9
- And the sea: poems, Sheep Meadow Press, 2006, ISBN 9781931357333
- Sleepwalk: California dreamin' and a last dance with the '60s, Eastern Washington University Press, 2006
- Modern history: prose poems 1987-2007, Tupelo Press, 2008, ISBN 978-1-932195-68-2
- Rolling the Bones: poems, UT Press, 2009, ISBN 978-1-59732-063-4
- One for the Money: The Sentence as a Poetic Form, A Poetry Workshop Handbook and Anthology., Lynx House Press, 2012, ISBN 978-0-89924-126-5

=== Memoir ===
- Cruising state: growing up in southern California, University of Nevada Press, 1994, ISBN 978-0-87417-247-8

=== Editor ===
- Naming the Lost: The Fresno Poets (Interviews & Essays. edited by Christopher Buckley (Stephen F. Austin University Press, 2021) ISBN 9781622889044
- Condition of the Spirit - The Life and Work of Larry Levis. edited by Christopher Buckley & Alexander Long (Eastern Washington University, 2004) ISBN 9780910055925
- How much earth: the Fresno poets, Editors Christopher Buckley, David Oliveira, M. L. Williams, Heyday Books, 2001, ISBN 978-0-9666691-7-6
- The geography of home: California's poetry of place, Editors Christopher Buckley, Gary Young, Heyday Books, 1999, ISBN 978-1-890771-19-5
