= Erica Funkhouser =

American poet

- Education: Stanford University; Vassar College
- Occupation: Poet
- Employer: Massachusetts Institute of Technology
- Awards: Guggenheim Fellowship; 2007 Poetry

Erica Funkhouser is an American poet.

She graduated from Vassar College with an AB and from Stanford University with a MA. She used to teach at the Massachusetts Institute of Technology.

Her work appeared in The Atlantic Monthly, The New Yorker, The Paris Review, Ploughshares, and Poetry. She lives in Essex, Massachusetts.

== Awards ==
- 2007 Guggenheim fellowship

== Works ==
- Post & Rail, University of Washington Press, 2018
- "Imaginary Friends", AGNI 66, 2006
- "Day Work", Beatrice, 15 March 2008
- "Love Poem with Harbor View", Poetry Foundation
- Earthly, Houghton Mifflin Harcourt, 2008, ISBN 978-0-618-93342-6
- Pursuit, Houghton Mifflin, 2002, ISBN 978-0-618-17152-1
- The actual world, Houghton Mifflin, 1997, ISBN 978-0-395-87707-4
- Sure Shot and Other Poems, Houghton Mifflin, 1992
- Natural Affinities, A. James Books, 1983, ISBN 978-0-914086-42-0

=== Anthologies ===
- "My Father's Lunch", Good Poems for Hard Times, Editor Garrison Keillor, Penguin Group, 2006, ISBN 978-0-14-303767-5
- "The Women Who Clean Fish", Working classics: poems on industrial life, Editors Peter Oresick, Nicholas Coles, University of Illinois Press, 1990, ISBN 978-0-252-06133-2
- "Lilies", Poetry from Sojourner: a feminist anthology, Editors Ruth Lepson, Lynne Yamaguchi Fletcher University of Illinois Press, 2004, ISBN 978-0-252-07154-6

=== Non-fiction ===
- Lewis & Clark: the journey of the Corps of Discovery, an illustrated history, Authors Dayton Duncan, Ken Burns, William Least Heat Moon, Stephen E. Ambrose, Erica Funkhouser, Knopf, 1997, ISBN 978-0-679-45450-2
