= Laura Steren =

Argentine nanoscientist

- Born: 11 January 1963 (age 63); Rosario, Argentina
- Education: National University of Rosario (BS); Balseiro Institute/National University of Cuyo (PhD)
- Awards: Guggenheim Fellowship (2007)
- Scientific career
- Workplaces: Balseiro Institute; National Scientific and Technical Research Council
- Thesis: Magnetismo en cupratos superconductores de alta temperatura crítica y compuestos relacionados (1992)

Laura Beatriz Steren (born 11 January 1963) is an Argentine nanoscientist. A 2007 Guggenheim Fellow, she is a researcher at the National Scientific and Technical Research Council (CONICET).

== Biography ==
Laura Beatriz Steren was born on 11 January 1963 in Rosario. She obtained a BS from the National University of Rosario in 1986 and a PhD from the Balseiro Institute and National University of Cuyo in 1992; her doctoral dissertation was titled Magnetismo en cupratos superconductores de alta temperatura crítica y compuestos relacionados.

In 1993, Steren joined the Laboratoire de Physique des Solides as a National Scientific and Technical Research Council (CONICET) postdoctoral fellow, serving until 1995. In 1996, she moved to the Bariloche Atomic Centre's Magnetic Resonance Laboratory as a CONICET Associate Researcher. She also became an associate professor at the Balseiro Institute in 1998, and directed their master programme in physics from 2002 until 2004. In 2003, she was a visiting professor at the Sabato Institute of Technology.

Steren became a CONICET independent researcher in 2003, and later became a senior researcher with them. By 2023, she had been appointed deputy director of the CONICET/National Atomic Energy Commission Institute of Nanoscience and Nanotechnology.

Steren's academic specialty is in magnetic nanotechnology. In 2007, she was awarded a Guggenheim Fellowship for a "study of spin-polarized transport phenomena in artificial magnetic nanostructures". He and Martin Sirena co-authored a book published by the Editorial Académica Española in 2012. In 2017, she coordinated the Argentina chapter of the European Union-funded SPICOLOST project on developing nanostructures to reduce cell phone energy usage.
