= Everyday Urbanism =

Urban design concept

Everyday Urbanism is a concept introduced by Margaret Crawford, John Chase and John Kaliski in 1999. Everyday Urbanism is in Margaret Crawford words: ”an approach to Urbanism that finds its meanings in everyday life”. Contrary to New Urbanism, Everyday Urbanism is not concerned with aesthetics but with specific activities of the daily life. It constitutes an empirical approach that strengthens frequently unnoticed existing situations and experiences that occur in everyday life.

Everyday Urbanism can also be considered as a method with a multidimensional consideration of the value of public spaces as it introduces various responses to specific times and places. For instance, the value of public spaces and community life is burst with street markets, street food vendors and murals organically created; this burst created by community life results in improvements to the public space that 'Everyday Urbanism' understands as an ‘improvement by appropriation’ or as a challenging appropriation of places in the city with temporary, short-lived urban activities.

The study of Everyday Urbanism contributes urban planning and urban design studies with an approach to the understanding of the social use of space. It introduces the idea of eliminating the distance between experts and ordinary users and forces designers and planners to contemplate a ‘shift of power’ and address social life from a direct and ordinary perspective.

Unlike urban design practices, Everyday Urbanism is not interested in the complete transformation of sites or urban spaces but instead in the intensification of these experiences by “working along with, on top of or after them”. Margaret Crawford indicates that the primary intention of the book ‘Everyday Urbanism’ was a “call to action”, she explains that the unification of ideas and practices presented in the book seek to introduce incentives for designers to rethink the approaches they currently use to understand everyday spaces and “to reconnect these human and social meanings with urban design and planning”. In contrast, David Walters in ‘New Urbanism and neighborhoods’ explains that Everyday Urbanism follows the roots of Postmodern planning theory in the sense that is less concerned with design as a practice and constructs a theory of explanation by hypothesizing meanings contained in the urban condition, therefore, not a theory of action as Crawford suggests.

David Walters introduces an additional interpretation; he finds Everyday Urbanism when “local communities and entrepreneurs reclaim leftover spaces of the capitalist city for their own use”.

Examples presented in the first introduction of the concept Everyday Urbanism were mostly based in cities like Los Angeles and New York in The United States. Examples of Everyday Urbanism contain appropriations of urban space such as temporary markets, ad hoc festivals or ad hoc street fairs on deserted parking lots, garage sales, street vendors and murals.

Ethnic minority group cases such as the Latino community in Los Angeles present transformation of the public environment on streets, fences, garages and yards, Camilo José Vergara documents this as part of the essays presented in the book ‘Everyday Urbanism’

== Influences ==
The work of Margaret Crawford, John Chase and John Kaliski on Everyday Urbanism was inspired by French philosophers Henry Lefebvre, Guy Debord and Michel de Certeau. Crawford explains how they serve as an introduction to Everyday urbanism:

“While acknowledging the oppression of daily life, each discovered its potential as a site of creative resistance and laboratory power. They insisted on the connections between theory and social practices, between thought and lived experience.”

Lefebvre insisted that experts considered everyday life as trivial and therefore ignore it. Lefebvre was probably the most important influence in their work, given that he presented urban conditions as everyday activities that are frequently overlooked.

== Concepts and Principles of Everyday Urbanism ==
The concept ‘Everyday Spaces’ is defined by Crawford as: “a diffuse landscape of banal, repetitive and ‘non-design’ locations”. Crawford presents migrants as an example of groups that appropriate spaces of the environment and create “vernacular architecture” in neighborhoods of Los Angeles. Unlike carefully planned spaces, everyday spaces are the public use found in underused spaces.

Everyday Urbanism is less concerned with spaces of the bourgeoisie such as manicured lawns, but rather interested in the poorer areas of cities, which is the opposite of designed public spaces under New Urbanism practices.

A principle introduced by Crawford is ’Refamiliarization’, she explains how Everyday Urbanism seeks to make ‘brutal’ spaces more ‘inhabitable’ by trying to “domesticate urban space”. She introduces examples such as streets of Los Angeles where refamiliarization brings economic and cultural activities created by residents.

As a consequence of the mismatch of aspirations between designers and the community, Crawford introduces a key principle ‘Dialogic’, she defines it as: “when a word, discourse, language, meaning (or building) becomes deprivileged, relativized, and aware of competing definitions for the same thing.”
