= National University of General San Martín =

Argentine Public University

Coordinates: 34°34′47″S 58°31′36″W

- Universidad Nacional de General San Martín
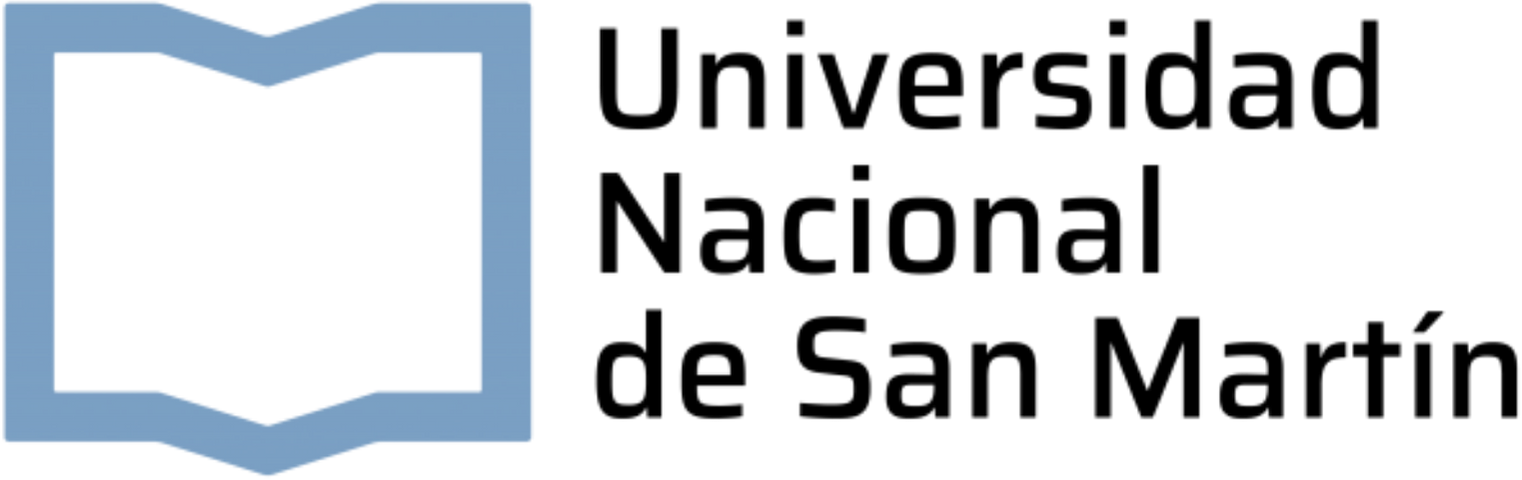
- Other name: UNSAM
- Motto: La Potencia de Talento (Spanish)
- Motto in English: The Power of Talent
- Type: Public and national
- Established: 10 June 1992; 34 years ago
- Rector: Carlos Greco
- Faculty: 1,408
- Students: 16,865
- Location: (79) Av. 25 de Mayo y (34) Francia, San Martín, Buenos Aires Province, Argentina
- Campus: Main campus: Miguelete, San Martín • Buenos Aires • Chascomús • Rosario
- Website: unsam.edu.ar

The National University of General San Martín (Spanish: Universidad Nacional de General San Martín, UNSAM) is an Argentine public university whose main campus is located in the city of San Martín, Buenos Aires Province.

The university was established in 1992, when the executive approved law number 2409 passed by Congress after years of bills presented and demands for creation dating back to 1990. The university launched officially its regular teaching activities in 1994.

== History ==
The creation of the National University of General San Martin was enabled by two trends: the first, following a tendency initiated in the 1970s, decentralization of the largest universities in Argentina; and the second, following the desire of the local community of San Martin to establish a university in its own territory. This tension forged the initial identity of the institution, promoting the capacities and meeting the local demands, and responding to the vacant areas in the Argentinian university system. The first academic activities of undergraduate and postgraduate students began in 1994.

The university's purported aim is to uphold the standards of academic liberty and respect for the diversity of thought; team spirit for the continual improvement of the institution; social responsibility and service vocation; efficiency and transparency in management; and respect for other's work and respect for the work environment.

== Academics ==
The university has 12 academic units dictating over 50 undergraduate courses and nearly 80 graduate courses:

- School of Art and Cultural Heritage (formerly IIPC / IAMK)
- School of Science and Technology (ECyT)
- School of Economics and Business (EEyN)
- School of Humanities (EHU)
- School of Politics and Government (EPyG)
- School of Habitat and Sustainability (formerly IT / IA / 3iA)
- Interdisciplinary School of Advanced Social Studies (IDAES)
- School of Bio- and Nanotechnology (formerly IIB / INTECH / INS)
- Industrial Quality Institute (INCALIN)
- Dan Beninson Nuclear Technology Institute (IDB)
- Professor Jorge Sabato Technology Institute (ITS)
- Institute of Rehabilitation and Movement Sciences (ICRyM)

Additionally, the university has an educational program within a prison facility: the San Martín University Center (CUSAM). It is located at Prison Unit No. 48 of the Buenos Aires Penitentiary Service (SPB), in the town of José León Suárez, district of General San Martín (Province of Buenos Aires).

== Campus ==
The main grounds of the university are located at Campus Miguelete, an 8.5-hectare compound named after Miguelete railway station. A surface of 48,000 square meters is occupied by buildings as of 2013. The campus was built on the site of a former rail yard. The campus features several repurposed historical structures, such as former fuel oil tanks, which once supplied locomotive engines and have since been converted into an auditorium and high-complexity laboratories. The site preserves other characteristic elements of its industrial past, including the original water taps that supplied steam engines. Additionally, former silos have been reused, now functioning as water reservoirs for the university's fire protection system.

Additional courses are imparted at the INTI and CNEA headquarters, in Buenos Aires. The Instituto Sabato is a branch of this university.

=== Gallery ===
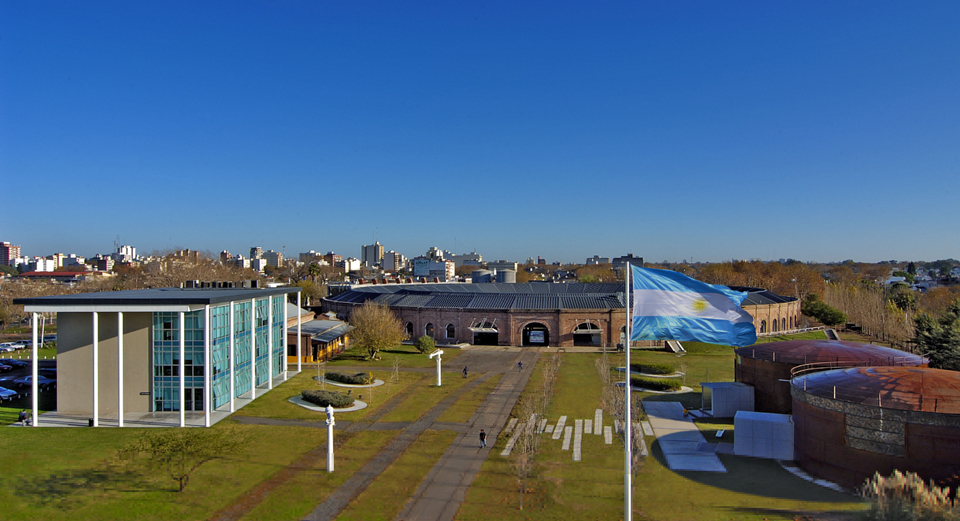
View of campus

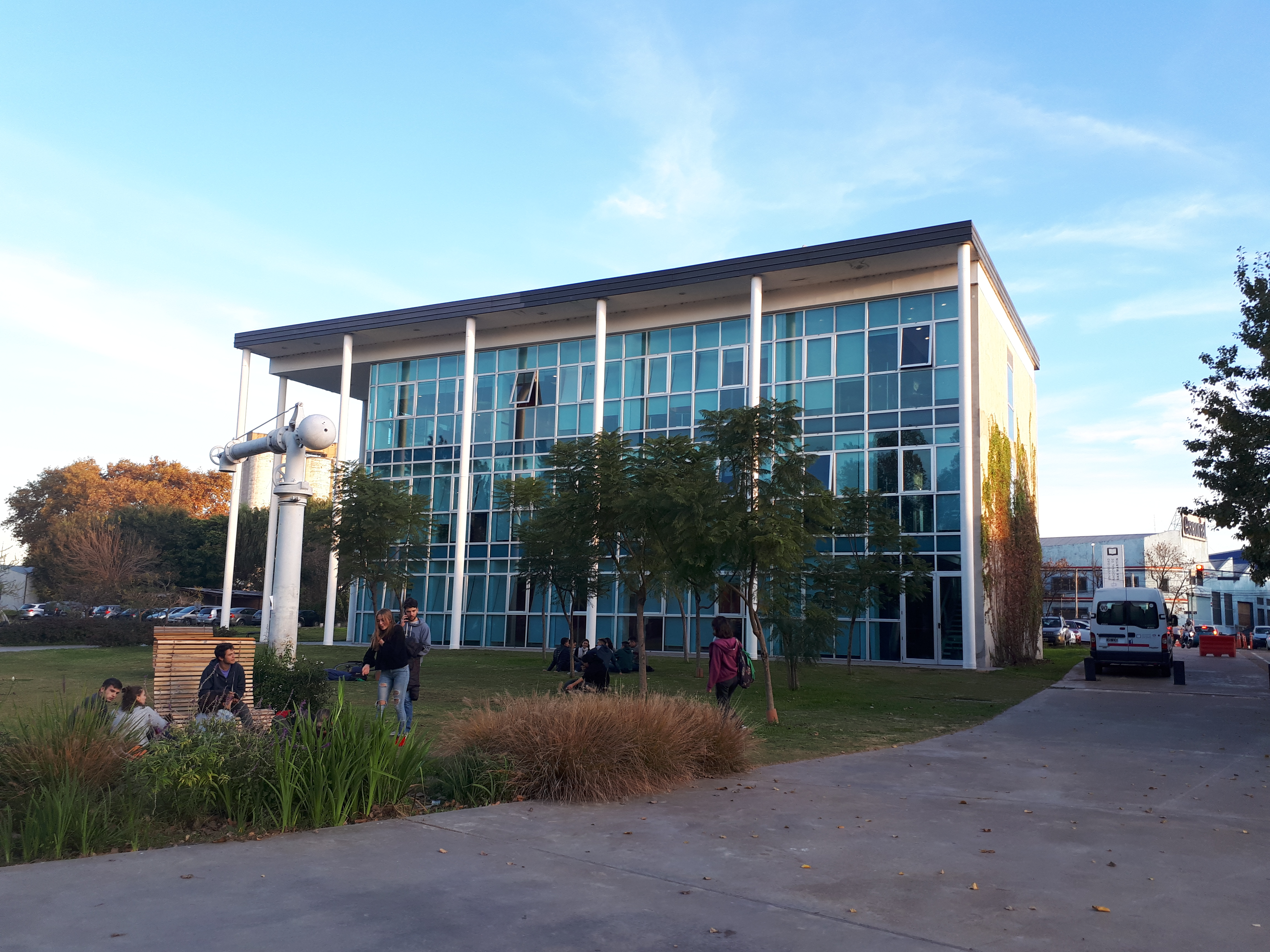
Rector's offices building

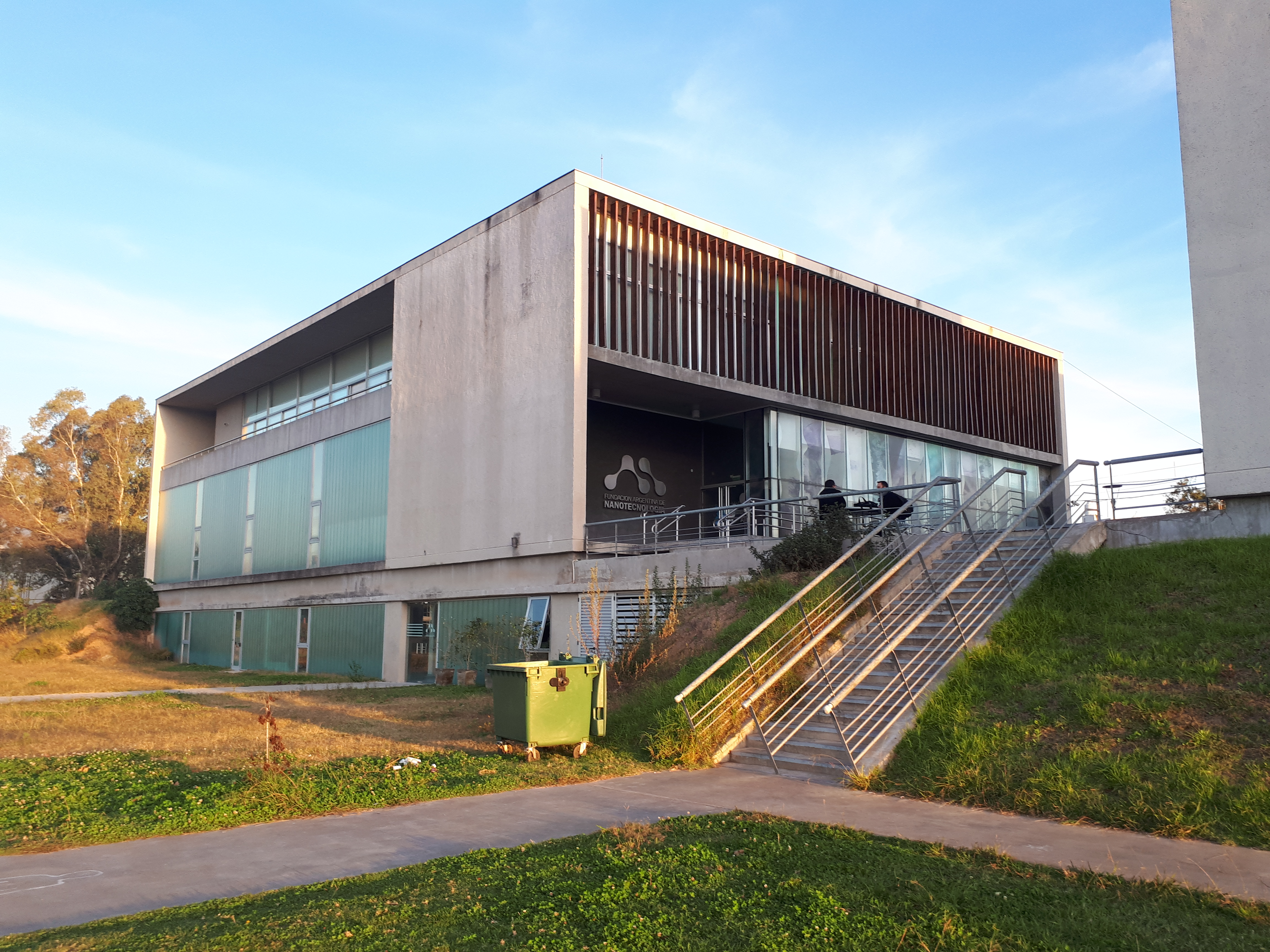
Fundación Argentina de Nanotecnologia UNSAM headquarters

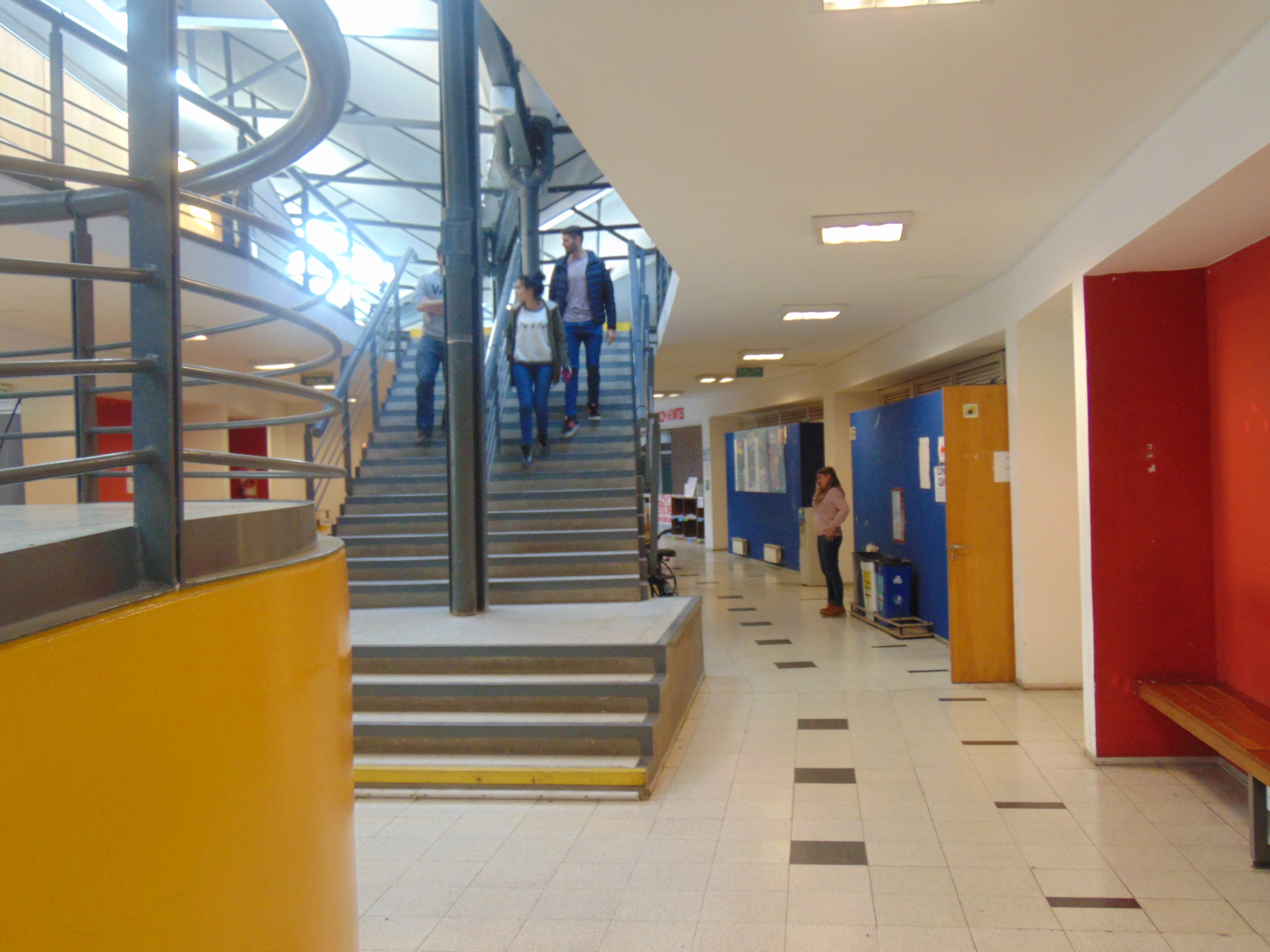
Hall at School of Humanities building

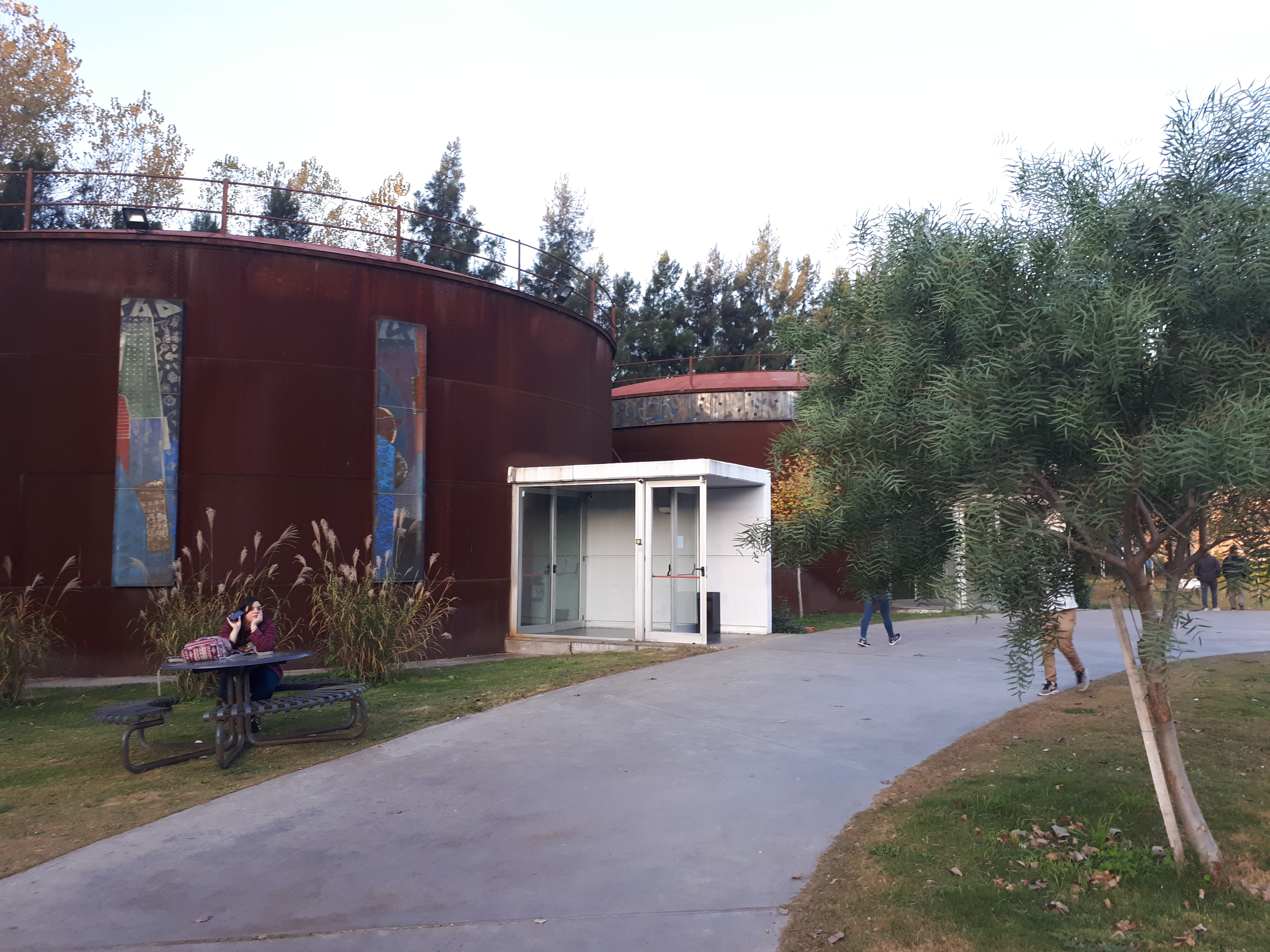
Auditorium built on a former water tank

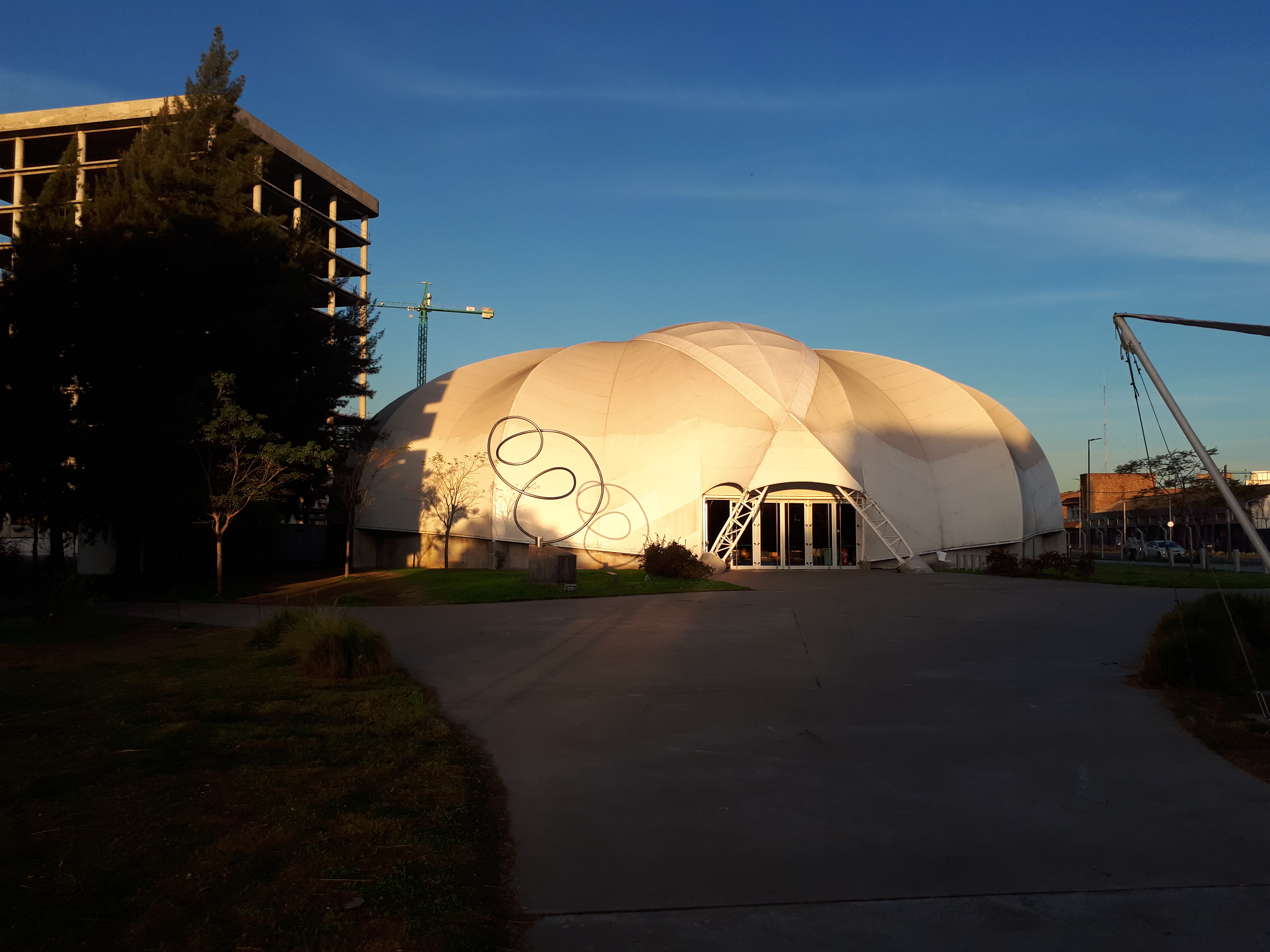
Circus tent
