= Nancy Sullivan (activist) =

American anthropologist and activist (1957-2015)

- Born: September 16, 1957; Orange, New Jersey, U.S.
- Died: July 16, 2015 (aged 57); LaGrange, New York, U.S.
- Occupations: Anthropologist; activist
- Children: 9 (all adopted)
- Awards: Guggenheim Fellowship (2007)

Academic background
- Education: Princeton University; Hunter College; New York University

Academic work
- Discipline: Anthropology
- Sub-discipline: Papua New Guinean studies
- Institutions: Divine Word University

Nancy Lynn Sullivan (September 16, 1957 – July 16, 2015) was an American anthropologist and activist. Born and raised in the Northeast United States, she moved to Papua New Guinea after doing research there as a New York University doctoral student. She ran an anthropology consulting company in Madang Province and advocated for Papua New Guinean environmental issues and tribal people. She also researched Karawari cave art and advocated for its preservation, and in 2007 received a Guggenheim Fellowship in the field.

== Early life and education ==
Nancy Lynn Sullivan was born on September 16, 1957, in Orange, New Jersey, Her father worked as a Wall Street executive. She was raised in Scarsdale, New York, where she graduated from Scarsdale High School in 1975. She obtained her BA from Princeton University in 1980 and her MFA from Hunter College in 1984. She originally worked as a freelance storyboard artist in the film and television industries.

Sullivan obtained her PhD in anthropology from New York University. As a doctoral student, she went to Papua New Guinea on a Fulbright grant to do research on the country's film and television industries. She subsequently became interested in the country and moved to Madang Province.

== Career ==
Sullivan ran an anthropology consulting company in her native Madang Province. She also researched Karawari cave art and advocated for its preservation; in 2007, she was awarded a Guggenheim Fellowship to study the art. She also received grants from both the National Geographic Society and Rockefeller Foundation.

Sullivan worked at Divine Word University as a Papua New Guinean studies lecturer from 2002 to 2004, and she was editor of Governance Challenges for PNG and the Pacific Islands, published though Divine Word University Press in 2004. She also worked as a tour guide for travel agency Asia Transpacific Journey.

Sullivan was an activist for Papua New Guinean environmental issues and tribal people, opposing both overdevelopment and the logging and mining industries' presence in the country's environment. She opposed Chinese plans for the Pacific Marine Industrial Zone near Madang due to concerns about its impact on the area's fish; the zone was still built, and the PNG government sued her and ten other anti-PMIZ activists as retribution, though she did succeed in advocating for compensation from PMIZ for local landowners, particularly in environmental issues.

== Personal life and death ==
She had nine children, all adopted from PNG villages. She once flew one of the children to the United States to have surgery to fix an eye injured in an archery incident. According to Associated Press journalist Chris Carola: during her time in PNG, Sullivan "explored crocodile-infested rivers [and] endured numerous bouts of malaria." Her brother Jeffrey recalled of Nancy: "We always joked about it: Scarsdale girl ends up at end of the earth, in the jungle".

On July 16, 2015, while driving on the Taconic State Parkway with her three grandchildren and their nanny en route to the family's summer home at Lake Champlain, Sullivan was killed when her SUV crashed into an embankment in LaGrange, New York.
