= Anastasia Fialkov =

Israeli astrophysicist

- אנסטסיה פילאקוב
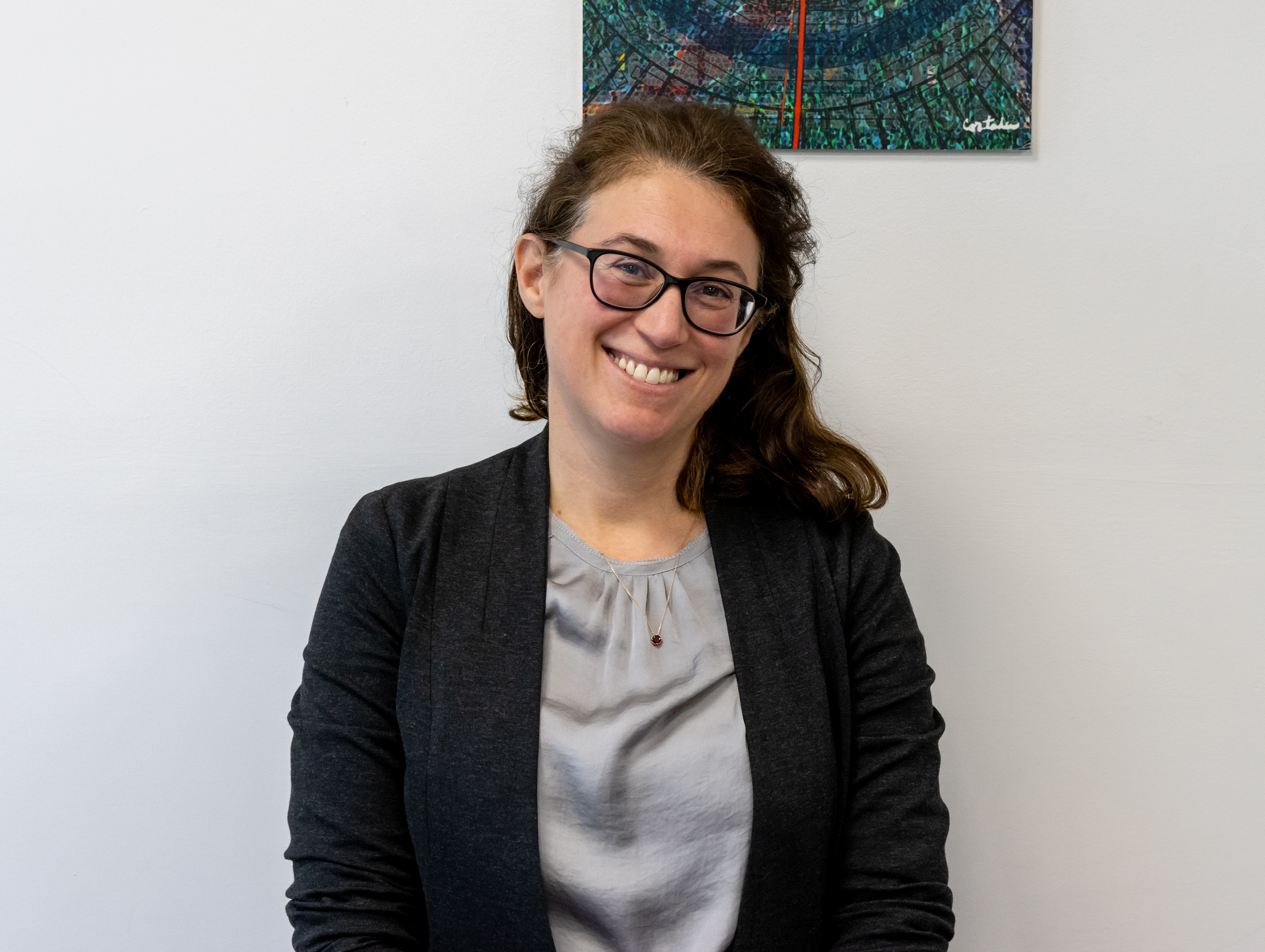
- Born: Karaganda
- Citizenship: Israel
- Alma mater: Technion – Israel Institute of Technology; Tel Aviv University
- Occupation: Astrophysicist; cosmologist; radio astronomer
- Academic career
- Institutions: École normale supérieure (2013–2015); Harvard–Smithsonian Center for Astrophysics (2015–2018); University of Cambridge (2019–)
- Thesis: people.ast.cam.ac.uk/~afialkov/AFialkovThesis.pdf (2013)

Anastasia Fialkov (Hebrew: אנסטסיה פילאקוב) is a Kazakhstan-born Israeli theoretical astrophysicist, currently a professor in the Institute of Astronomy of the University of Cambridge, England, and a senior research fellow of Magdalene College, Cambridge.

== Research ==
Fialkov began her doctoral studies working in string cosmology, but then switched to theoretical radio astronomy. Her research involves interactions between matter and dark matter, the possible explanation of dark matter as a Bose–Einstein condensate, cosmic reionization, the use of machine learning to fit the parameters of these phenomena, and the implications of these phenomena for galaxy formation. Her studies have included works estimating the cosmic abundance of fast radio bursts, and using observations of the 21cm hydrogen line to characterize the size and brightness of the earliest galaxies.

== Education and career ==
Fialkov is originally from Karaganda, in Kazakhstan, but emigrated to Israel and became an Israeli citizen. She studied both physics and electrical engineering as an undergraduate at the Technion – Israel Institute of Technology, earning a double bachelor's degree in 2006. She went to Tel Aviv University for doctoral study in the Department of Particle Physics, advised by Nissan Itzhaki and Rennan Barkana. She defended her dissertation, Observing the Unobservable: Catching a Glimpse of the Primordial Universe, in 2013.

She was a postdoctoral researcher as a Junior Research Chair at the International Centre for Fundamental Physics in Paris from 2013 to 2015, as an ITC Fellow at the Harvard University Institute for Theory and Computation from 2015 to 2018, and as a Kavli Fellow at the Kavli Institute for Cosmology, Cambridge, and the Cambridge University Institute of Astronomy in 2018.

From 2019 to 2023, she was a lecturer in the Institute of Astronomy and a Royal Society University Research Fellow at Sussex University. In 2023, Cambridge promoted her to Professor of Astrophysics and Cosmology.
