= Jorge Sabato =

Argentine physicist (1924–1983)

Jorge Alberto Sábato
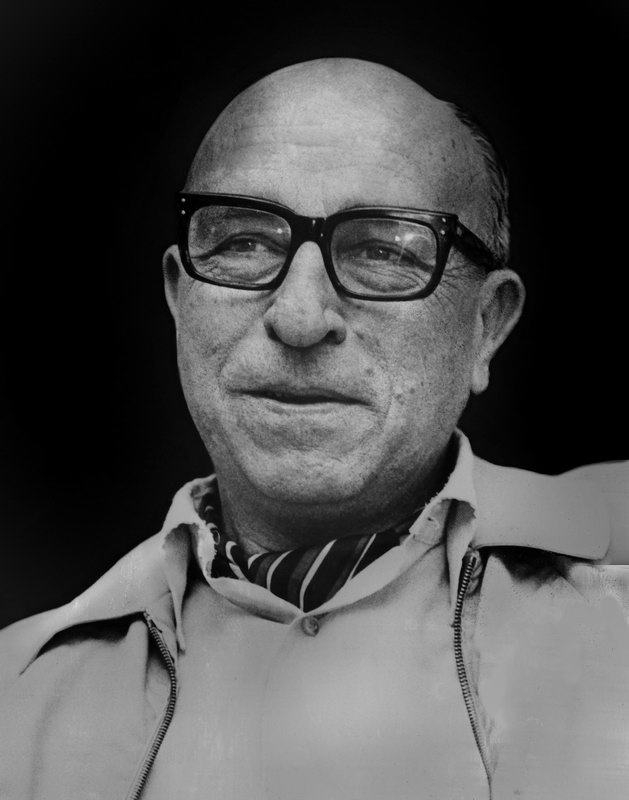
- Jorge Alberto Sábato
- Born: June 4, 1924; Argentina
- Died: November 16, 1983 (aged 59); Argentina
- Education: Instituto Superior del Profesorado Dr. Joaquín V. González
- Scientific career
- Fields: Metallurgy
- Workplaces: CNEA

Jorge Alberto Sábato (June 4, 1924 – November 16, 1983) was an Argentine physicist and technologist.

In 1955, he created the Metallurgy department at CNEA, and was its director up to 1968 when he became Technology manager of the CNEA. While with the CNEA he promulgated the Sábato triangle model, dealing with interrelationships between science, government and industry in promoting scientific and technological development.

In 1976, he was one of the creators of INVAP SE, he was the spiritual godfather, introducing the concept of "Technology Company".

In 1993, the Instituto Sábato was created as a result of all his effort towards the development of materials science in Argentina.

== See also ==
- CNEA
