= Smadar Naoz =

Israeli-American astrophysicist

- סמדר נאוז
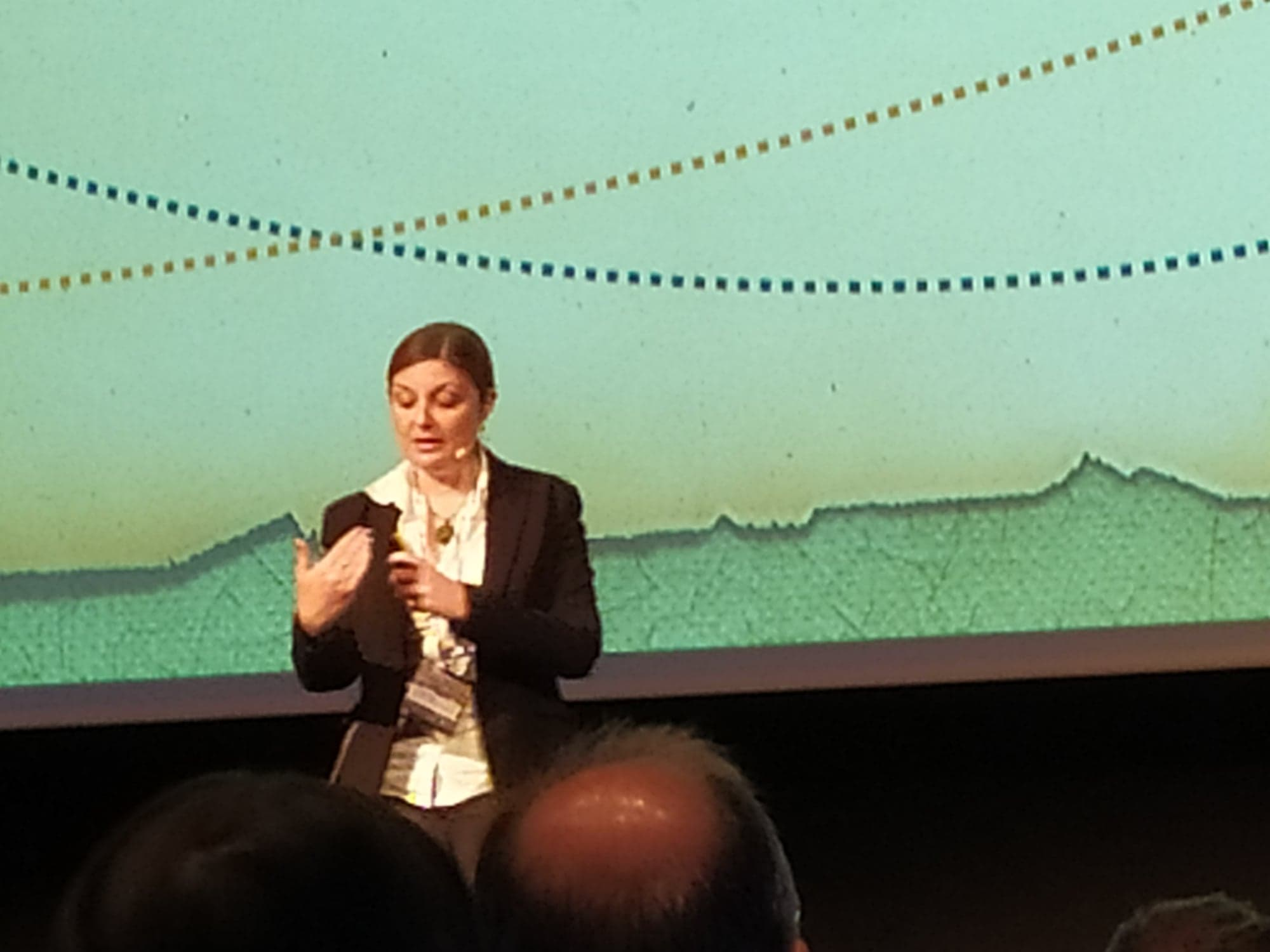
- Born: 1978 (age 47–48)
- Education: PhD, Tel Aviv University, 2010
- Scientific career
- Fields: Astrophysics
- Institutions: University of California, Los Angeles
- Thesis: The first generation of galaxies and 21cm fluctuations (2010)
- Doctoral advisor: Rennan Barkana

Smadar Naoz (Hebrew: סמדר נאוז; born 1978) is an Israeli-American astrophysicist, and was the 2015 winner of the Annie Jump Cannon Award in Astronomy for her scientific contributions to the fields of cosmology and planetary dynamics.

== Early life and education ==
Naoz grew up in Jerusalem, Israel, and developed her love for astrophysics at a young age with her mother regularly watching Star Trek: The Original Series with her and her younger sister. She graduated from the Racah Institute at The Hebrew University with her Bachelors of Science (2002) and her Masters in Science (2004), before continuing her education at the Tel Aviv University, where she was awarded her PhD in 2010. The subject of her PhD research was the first generation of galaxies.

== Career ==
After obtaining her PhD, Naoz accepted an IAU Gruber postdoctoral fellowship at Northwestern University's Center for Interdisciplinary Exploration and Research in Astrophysics (CIERA). After her tenure as an IAU Gruber postdoc, she became an Einstein Fellow at the Institute for Theory and Computation at the Center for Astrophysics | Harvard & Smithsonian in Cambridge, Massachusetts.

Naoz is continuing her research, and working as an assistant professor at the Department of Physics and Astronomy at the University of California, Los Angeles.

== Research ==
Naoz started her career investigating the formation of the first generation of galaxies following the creation of the universe, contributing to cosmology by trying to piece together early structure formation.

Naoz has been probing the dynamical evolution of Hot Jupiters. She has published many papers in leading scientific journals, including a paper about Hot Jupiters interactions, in the science journal Nature.

== Awards ==
- Fellow of the American Physical Society, 2022
- Helen B. Warner Prize for Astronomy awarded by the American Astronomical Society, 2020
- Annie Jump Cannon Prize awarded by the American Astronomical Society, 2015
- Einstein Fellowship awarded by NASA, Sept. 2012
- The National Postdoctoral Award Program for Advancing Women in Science, awarded by Weizmann Institute of Science, 2009-2011
- Dan David Prize 2009 scholarship recipient in the field of "Astrophysics – History of the Universe"
- The Peter and Patricia Gruber Foundation Fellowship in 2010.
- School of Physics and Astronomy Award for Outstanding Achievements, awarded by Tel Aviv University, 2006
