= Michael Penn (author) =

Michael Penn is the Teresa Hihn Moore Professor of Religious Studies at Stanford University, and formerly taught at Mount Holyoke College in Massachusetts.

His writings include the book Kissing Christians: Ritual, Community, and the Late Ancient Church (ISBN 978-0812238808). He received a Guggenheim Fellowship and other grants for studies of the Syriac Christians and their relationship to Islam. He was quoted in USA Today regarding the veracity of the Gospel of Judas.

Penn's courses at Mount Holyoke included "What Didn't Make It into the Bible" and "Sex and the Early Church". Penn studied molecular biology and was a debater at Princeton University, then received his Ph.D. from Duke University. He attended Pinewood High School in California, from which he graduated in 1989.
