= Ernesto Oroza =

Cuban artist and designer based in South Florida

- Born: 1968; Cuba
- Education: Instituto Superior de Deseño, Havana, Cuba
- Notable work: "Technological Disobedience in Cuba"
- Awards: Cintas Fellowship

Ernesto Oroza (1968, Cuba) is a Cuban visual artist and designer based in South Florida. Oroza's work discusses media and technology within contemporary culture.

== Education and Academic Career ==
Ernesto Oroza earned a degree at the Havana Superior Institute of Design. He was visiting professor in Les Ateliers, Ecole Nationale Superieure de Creation Industrielle (ENSCI) in Paris (1998), and professor of the Polytechnic Institute of Design of Havana from 1995 to 2000.

== Work ==
Oroza's work investigates concepts on radical architecture and design principles related to Cuban economy, manufacturing, and material culture.

Oroza was co-founder (1999) of Laboratory Maldeojo (with Fabian Martinez and Nelson Rossell), member until 2004 (Havana, Cuba) and co-founder (1995) of Ordo Amoris Cabinet (with Diango Hernandez, Juan Bernal, Francis Acea), member until 1996 (Havana, Cuba).

In 2019, he was an Artist-in-Residency at Oolites Arts, Miami. In 2016, Oroza was awarded the Pernod Ricard Fellow 2016 and was a resident at the Villa Vassilieff, Paris, to develop his project ParaISO (Factogram).

=== Collections (selection) ===
His work is included in the collections of the Pérez Art Museum Miami, Florida.

=== Exhibitions (selection) ===
His work has been exhibited in museums, galleries and cultural spaces such as Haute Definition Gallery, in Paris (France), The Montreal Museum of Fine Arts, Canada, The Museum of Modern Art, MoMA, in New York (USA), LABoral Centro de Arte y Creación Industrial, in Spain and the Groninger Museum, The Netherlands.

== Awards and recognition ==
- South Florida Cultural Consortium Fellowship for Visual and Media Artists, Florida. 2012
- Artist in residence, Karl Hofer Gessellschaft, Universitat der Kunst, Berlin. 2011.
- Harpo Foundation Grant , Los Angeles. 2010.
- Here and There, Berlin Residency, Bass Museum. 2010.
- Vizcaya Museum and Gardens, Miami, FL. 2010.
- Cintas Foundation Fellowship, 2008, NY.
- Guggenheim Fellowship, 2007 NY.
- Artist in Residence, Christoph Merian Stiftung, Basel, 2006.
- Danish Center for Cultural Development. (with Maja Aasa, Greta Garcia and Mira Kongstein, 2005.
- Ludwig Foundation Fellowship, Cuba, 2001–2004.
- Direction aux Arts Plastiques (DAP) Fonds d'incitation à la création (FIACRE) (with Penelope de Bozzi). France, 1999–2000.

== Books by Ernesto Oroza ==
- "Notes sur la maison moirée. Ou un urbanisme pour des villes qui se vident". Published by Cité du design et École nationale supérieure d’architecture de Saint-Étienne, 2013.
-Editing Havana- Stories of Popular Housing Maja Asaa, Mira Kongstein and Ernesto Oroza with photographs by Frederikke Friderichsen, 2011. ISBN 978-87-91984-17-4. Published by Aristo Bogforlag.
-"RIKIMBILI. Une étude sur la désobéissance technologique et quelques formes de réinvention." Ernesto Oroza, 2009. Préfacier: Marie-Haude Caraës Traducteur: Nicole Marchand-Zanartu. ISBN 978-2-86272-527-7. Publications de l’Université de Saint-Étienne, 2009. Cité du design.
-Statement of Necessity. Ernesto Oroza. 2008. Alonso Art, US.
-Pentagram Paper no. 32 “NO WASTE.” Ernesto Oroza and Laboratory Maldeojo, 2003. With an introduction by Alex Marashian and design by Fernando Gutierrez. London, Pentagram Design.
-Objets Réinventé. La création populaire a Cuba. Ernesto Oroza and Penélope de Bozzi, 2002. Paris: Ëditions Alternatives.
