= Alan Loehle =

American painter

Alan David Loehle (born 1954) is an American contemporary artist and professor of art at Oglethorpe University in Atlanta, Georgia.

== Education and career ==
Born in Chicago, Illinois, Loehle received his B.F.A. from the University of Georgia in 1975 and his M.F.A. from the University of Arizona in 1979. He began exhibiting his paintings in Atlanta and New York City in 1983, and his work was featured in a 1999 print exhibition in the Paris Review. He has been teaching at Oglethorpe since 2001, and received a Guggenheim Fellowship for Painting in 2007.

== Paintings ==
Loehle's work, which includes both paintings and drawings, is characterized by its ambiguity and disturbing images. A 2004 Creative Loafing article stated that his paintings are characterized by a "triumvirate of flesh: dogs, dwarfs and meat", describing his paintings as "...masterful ruminations on the slender cord separating life from death and humanity from debasement." His specific works include a series of three oil paintings and one small ink-and-brush work, which he produced from 1997 to 2002 as part of a series centered around an achondroplastic dwarf model. These works include Walking Man, depicting an anonymous man walking on a desolate background landscape, and the Head, depicting the same model standing over a severed pig head. He has said that the images in these paintings are meant to symbolize the human condition.
