= Jose Rodolfo Galvele =

Argentine chemist (1937–2011)

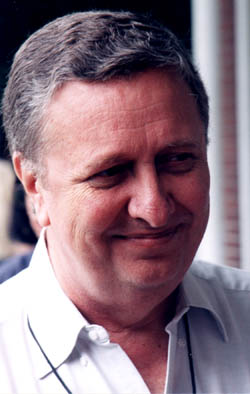
- Born: 10 March 1937
- Died: 31 August 2011 (aged 74); Buenos Aires, Argentina
- Resting place: La Chacarita Cemetery
- Education: Universidad de Buenos Aires; University of Cambridge
- Known for: Stress Corrosion Cracking, Pitting
- Awards: NACE Whitney Award (1999); Corrosion Science TP Hoar award (1981 and 1987); Evans Award from the Institute of Corrosion, UK (1999); Argentine Association for Metals Pistocchi award (1972); Platinum Konex award (2003)

Dr. José Rodolfo Galvele (March 10, 1937 – July 31, 2011) was an Argentine chemist.

His research focus was on the mechanism of intergranular corrosion of aluminum-copper alloys and on the pitting of metals. He proposed a mechanism of stress corrosion cracking

He was awarded the Konex award in 2003.

Galvele was the first dean of Instituto Sabato from 1993 to 2007.

== Books ==
- Jorge A. Sabato, creador de la metalurgia en CNEA : ¿cómo se hace para crear un laboratorio de excelencia? (November 2009). Inst. de

Tecnología Professor Jorge A. Sabato, ISBN 978-987-96501-6-5

- Degradación de materiales I : corrosión (2006). Jorge Baudino Eds., ISBN 987-9020-65-0
