= Sabato Institute of Technology =

College in General San Martín, Argentina

- Type: Public
- Established: 1993; 33 years ago
- Affiliations: National University of General San Martín, National Atomic Energy Commission
- Dean: Dr. Ricardo Mario Carranza
- Academic advisory council: Dra. Ana María Monti, Ing. Teresa Pérez, Dr. Gustavo Sergio Duffó, Dr. Martín Alejo Alurralde
- Location: General San Martín, Buenos Aires, Argentina; 34°34′18″S 58°30′49″W
- Campus: Constituyentes Atomic Center
- Language: Spanish
- Colors
- Website: www.isabato.edu.ar

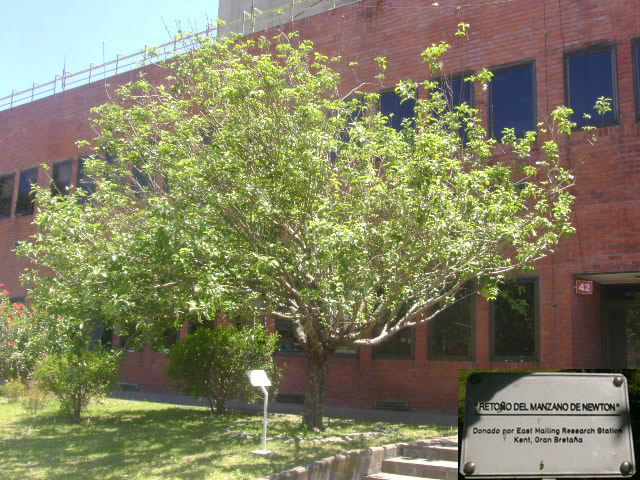
A reputed descendant of Newton's apple tree at the Sabato Institute

Sabato Institute of Technology (Spanish: Instituto de Tecnología Sabato) is an academic institution that belongs partially to the National University of General San Martín and partially to Argentina's National Atomic Energy Commission. It is named after Jorge Alberto Sabato, Argentine physicist and technologist distinguished in the field of metallurgy.

Sabato Institute teaches mainly Materials Science related courses, at undergraduate and postgraduate levels. It is one of the three institutes managed by Argentina's National Atomic Energy Commission (CNEA), as well as Balseiro Institute and Dan Beninson Institute of Nuclear Technology. The International Atomic Energy Agency (IAEA) designated the CNEA in 2018 as a "Collaborative Center" in Latin America. The CNEA, through its training institutes, assumed the commitment to provide assistance to the IAEA Activities Program, thus contributing to the promotion of the peaceful uses of nuclear energy.

The Institute has adequate scientific equipment, libraries, laboratories and a high academic level of its teaching staff, made up of researchers from the National Atomic Energy Commission, the National Scientific and Technical Research Council, the National Institute of Industrial Technology, the National Agricultural Technology Institute and industry specialists. Sabato Institute students have full access to the "Eduardo J. Savino" Information Center.

== Course offerings ==
Undergraduate

- Bachelor's degree (B.Eng.) in Materials Engineering. The institute admits students who have completed at least two years of university studies (corresponding to basic knowledge in calculus, algebra, physics and chemistry) and undergoes an admission exam and an interview with the authorities.

Postgraduate

- Master's degree (M.Sc.) in Materials Science and Technology.
- Doctor's degree (Ph.D.) in Science and Technology, Materials mention.
- Doctor's degree (Ph.D.) in Science and Technology, Physics mention.
- Double doctor's degree (Ph.D.) in Astrophysics, along with the Karlsruhe Institute of Technology.
- Specialization in nondestructive testing.

Other

- Diploma in Materials Science for Nuclear Industry. The institute admits students who have completed secondary education.
- Lab Zero course for senior year high school students.

=== Scholarships ===
Sabato Institute offers scholarships for the Engineering program via Argentina's National Atomic Energy Commission or via private companies such as Techint. The scholarships are intended to guarantee exclusive dedication to study. In the same way, it offers scholarships for the Master's.

== Notable people ==
=== Professors ===
- Dr. José Rodolfo Galvele (1937–2011), chemist and corrosion specialist; founder of the Corrosion Department at National Atomic Energy Commission; in 1981 and 1987 he received the Corrosion Science TP Hoar Award; in 1999 he received the NACE Whitney Award and the UK Institute of Corrosion Evans Award.
- Dr. José Victorio Ovejero-García (c. 1941 – 2021), physicist, metallurgist and hydrogen damage specialist; developer of the Hydrogen Microprint Technique, a method to visualize hydrogen trapped in steels; in 1989 and 1991 he received an award from the Argentine Institute of Iron and Steel Industry.

=== Deans ===
- 1993 – 2007: José Rodolfo Galvele
- 2007 – 2019: Ana María Monti
- since 2019: Ricardo Mario Carranza

== See also ==
- National Atomic Energy Commission
- National University of General San Martin
- Jorge Alberto Sabato
- Balseiro Institute
