= National Institute of Industrial Technology =

Argentine State Research Agency

The National Industrial Technology Institute (Spanish: Instituto Nacional de Tecnología Industrial), commonly known as INTI, is an Argentine federal agency in charge of the developing of Industrial technology.

It was created in 1957.

== See also ==
- INTA, National Agricultural Technology Institute of Argentina
