= Maria Flook =

American writer

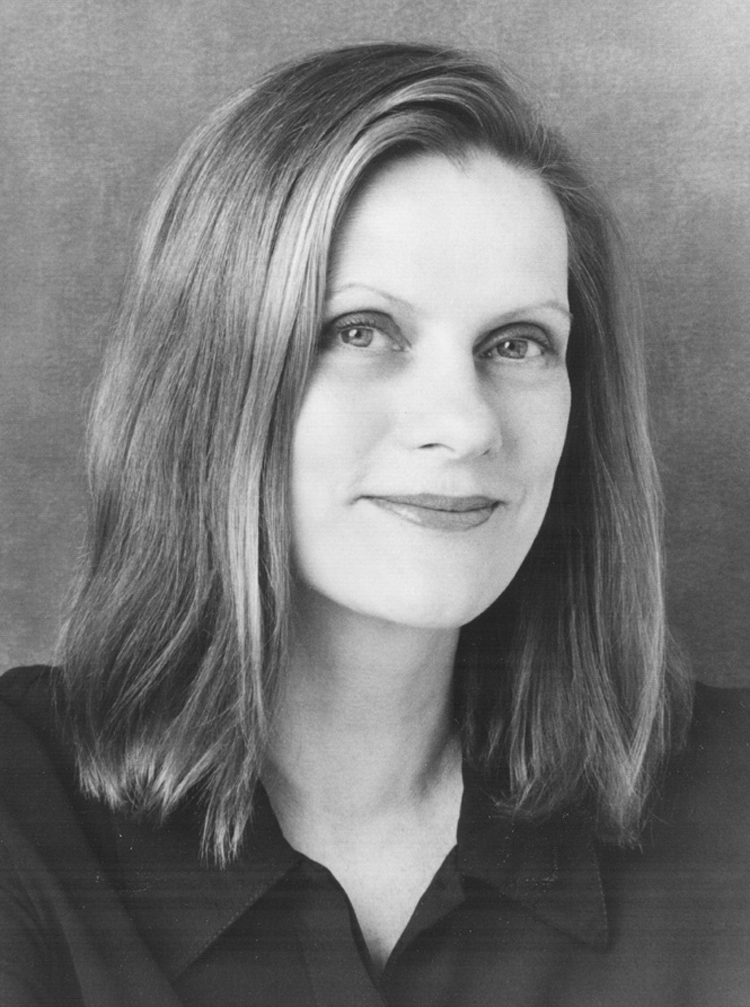
Author Maria Flook

Maria Flook is an America fiction and non-fiction writer and the winner of a 2007 John Simon Guggenheim Memorial Foundation Award.

== Works ==
Maria Flook's most notable books are the nonfiction works My Sister Life: The Story of My Sister's Disappearance, (Pantheon, 1998) and New York Times Best Seller Invisible Eden: A Story of Love and Murder on Cape Cod (Broadway Books, 2003). Amy Hempel selected My Sister Life for BOMB Magazine's Editor's Choice.

In a review of her 2014 novel Mothers and Lovers, the Boston Globe remarked that "Flook’s oeuvre is unified by her subtly witty, deep dives into family dynamics, and forbidden sexual acts and desires." Her 2018 memoir First Person Female was criticized by Kirkus for being "lurid"; the reviewer also notes that "the author writes deeply and well when the lens is on someone else and the topics at hand."

Flooks earlier works include the novels Open Water; Family Night, which received a PEN American/Ernest Hemingway Foundation Special Citation; Lux, (Little, Brown and Company, 2004); Mothers and Lovers (Roundabout Press, 2014) and a collection of stories, You Have the Wrong Man (Pantheon, 1996). She has also published two collections of poetry, Sea Room and Reckless Wedding, winner of the Houghton Mifflin New Poetry Series. Her work has appeared in the New York Times Book Review, The New Yorker, The New Criterion, TriQuarterly, and More Magazine among others.

Flook was Distinguished Writer-in-Residence at Emerson College and has also taught in the Bennington College Writing Seminars, at Warren Wilson, and the Fine Arts Work Center in Provincetown. She lives on Cape Cod, Massachusetts.
