= SoHyun Bae =

American painter (b. 1967)

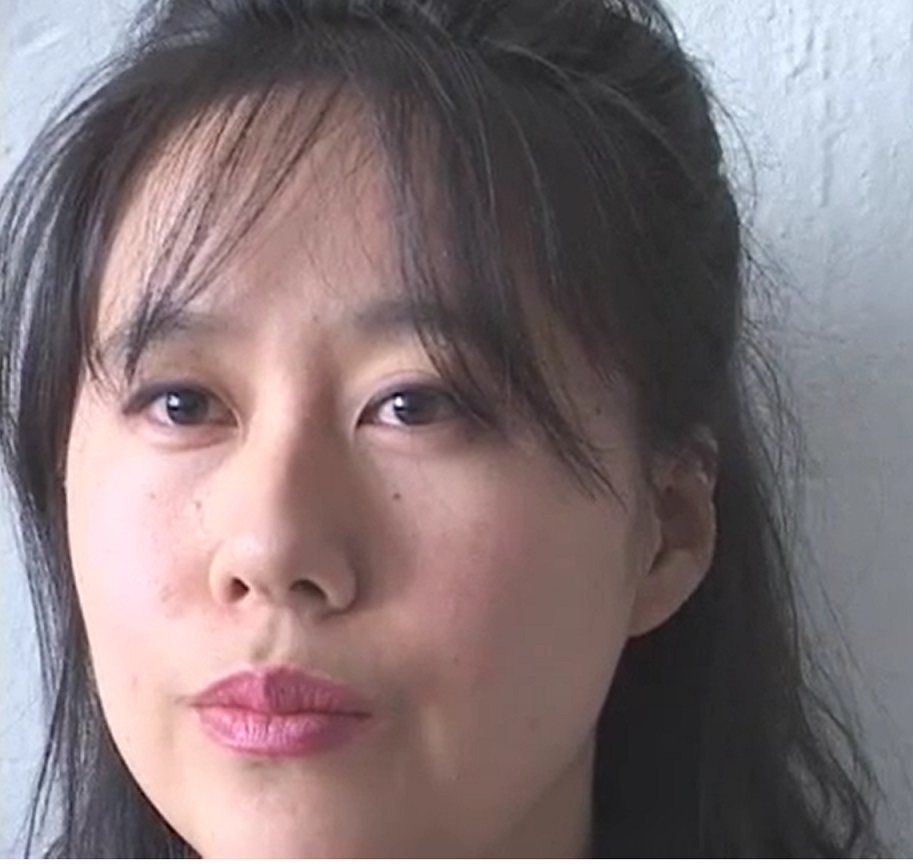
SoHyun Bae

SoHyun Bae (born 1967) is an American painter living and working in New York. Her iconography has been described as being shaped by "a history lived from afar, therefore colored by the absence/presence of memory, doubts of otherness, longing, mythologizing and an awareness of archetypal belonging.”

== Education ==
SoHyun Bae received a Bachelor of Fine Arts from the Rhode Island School of Design in 1990 having spent her senior year abroad in Rome, Italy in the European Honors Program, a Master of Fine Arts from Boston University in 1994, and a Master of Theological Studies from Harvard Divinity School in 1997.

== Life ==
SoHyun Bae was born in Seoul, Korea to Jongwoo Bae, an Editor/Producer of Donga Broadcasting network and Hyunye Cho, an essayist and an author of children’s books. Her father’s protest against censorship by Park Chung-hee’s dictatorial regime was the reason why her family came to the United States. He was a leading figure in the Donga Ilbo Blank Advertisement Incident (Donga Ilbo Baekji Gwang-go Satae). She was eight years old when her family immigrated to the United States.

Early influences were: Pak Tu-jin, a Korean poet; John Walker, a British painter; Elie Wiesel, a writer and Nobel laureate; and Richard Nieburh, Hollis Professor of Divinity at Harvard University.

SoHyun Bae moved to New York in 1997 where she met and worked with: Karel Appel, painter and a founding member of the Cobra Movement; and Esteban Vicente, a first generation Abstract Expressionist. In the years she lived abroad in Bologna, Italy (2003 - 2009), she met and befriended Vasco Bendini, a painter and a founding member of Arte Informale.

== Awards ==
SoHyun Bae is the recipient of numerous awards including: The John Simon Guggenheim Memorial Foundation Fellowship, in Fine Arts, Art 2007; The New York Foundation for the Arts, Fellowship in the field of Painting, 2002; The Pollock-Krasner Foundation, Inc. Grant, 2000; a Fellowship at Montalvo Art Center, 2019, a Fellowship at The Corporation of Yaddo, 2000; The National Endowment for the Arts Fellowship in conjunction with Virginia Center for Creative Arts, 1996; and a full scholarship to the Skowhegan School of Painting and Sculpture, 1993.

== Exhibitions ==
Her works have been exhibited world wide in numerous galleries, auction houses and museums including the Asian Art Museum of San Francisco; Peabody Museum of Archaeology and Ethnology at Harvard University; Seoul Arts Center Hangaram Museum; Museo Nacional di Visual Artes, Montevideo; Queens Museum, Sotheby’s NY, and Philips de Pury & Luxembourg.
