= Nuclear power in Argentina =

Nuclear power stations in Argentina (view)
Active plants
Under construction

In Argentina, about 10% of the electricity comes from 3 operational nuclear reactors: Embalse (a CANDU reactor), and Atucha I and II, two PHWR German designs also known as PHWR KWU as per PRIS.

== History ==
Argentina had uranium mines, producing 2,582 tonnes until 1997. The Don Otto uranium mine in Salta was open between 1963 and 1981. The Cerro Solo deposit in Chubut could hold 4600 tonnes, of the country's total of 10,000 tonnes.

In 2001, the Atucha plant was modified to burn Slightly Enriched Uranium, making it the first PHWR reactor to burn that fuel worldwide. Atucha was originally planned to be a complex with various reactors. Atucha 2 (similar to Atucha 1 but more powerful) began to produce energy on June 3, 2014, and producing 745 MW. Plans for Atucha III, a third reactor in the Atucha complex, have been announced.

Argentina also has various research reactors, and exports nuclear technology. Nucleoeléctrica of Argentina and Atomic Energy of Canada Limited are negotiating over the contracts and project delivery model for a new 740 MWe CANDU nuclear power plant.

In July 2014, Russian President Vladimir Putin signed a nuclear energy cooperation agreement with Argentine President Cristina Fernández Kirchner, during a visit to the country.

In February 2015, Argentine president Cristina Kirchner and Chinese Communist Party general secretary Xi Jinping signed a cooperation agreement, and the build of a Hualong One design power station has been proposed.

In December 2015 a new uranium enrichment plant to manufacture fuel for Argentina's nuclear plants, located in Pilcaniyeu, was inaugurated. The plant will use both gaseous diffusion and more modern laser techniques.

China and Argentina had agreed a contract to build a 700 MWe CANDU 6 derived reactor. Its construction was planned to start in 2018 at Atucha, but it was indefinitely suspended by Mauricio Macri's government due to financial issues. The building of a 1000 MWe Hualong One plant was planned to start in 2020.

== Reactors ==
=== Commercial ===
Plant name	Unit No.	Type	Model	Status	Capacity (MW)	Begin building	Commercial operation	Closed
Atucha	1	PHWR	Siemens-KWU	Operation suspended (under maintenance)	362	1 Jun 1968	24 Jun 1974	
Atucha	2	PHWR	Siemens-KWU	Operational	745	14 Jul 1981	27 Jun 2014	
Atucha	3	PWR	Hualong One	Planned	1200			
Embalse	1	PHWR	CANDU-6	Operational	683	1 Apr 1974	20 Jan 1984	(2049)
CAREM	1	PWR	CAREM25	Under construction	25	8 Feb 2014		

=== Research reactors ===
Name	Reactor type	Status	Capacity in kWt	Construction start date	First criticality date	Closure	Operator and owner
RA-0	Tank	Operational	0.01	January 1954	1 January 1965		National University of Córdoba
RA-1 Enrico Fermi	Tank	Operational	40	April 1957	20 January 1958		National Atomic Energy Commission
RA-2	Critical assembly	Decommissioned	0.03	January 1965	1 July 1966	23 September 1983^{a}	National Atomic Energy Commission
RA-3	Pool	Operational	10,000	February 1963	17 May 1967		National Atomic Energy Commission
RA-4	HOMOG	Operational	0.001	January 1971	1 January 1972		National University of Rosario
RA-6	Pool	Operational	3,000	September 1978	23 September 1982		National Atomic Energy Commission
RA-8	Critical assembly	Temporary Shutdown	0.01	January 1986	16 June 1997	2001	National Atomic Energy Commission
RA-10		Under construction	30,000	March 2016	(late 2023)		National Atomic Energy Commission

== Legislation ==
Provinces that have banned the construction of nuclear power plants are:

=== Chaco ===
- Provincial Law, Nº 3902
  - Article 1: Declare the territory of the Chaco Province nuclear-free zone.

=== Corrientes ===
- Provincial Law, Nº 4207
  - Article 1: Prohibits throughout the territory of the Corrientes Province, installing nuclear plants.

=== Entre Ríos ===
- Provincial Law, Nº 8785
  - Article 3: It is forbidden the installation of nuclear power plants

=== La Pampa ===
- Provincial Constitution
  - Article 18: La Pampa is declared a nuclear-free zone, to the extent determined by a special law in order to preserve the environment. Any damage it causes to the environment will generate liability under the applicable legal regulations or as may be provided.

=== Río Negro ===
- Provincial Law, Nº 5227
  - Article 1: It is forbidden in the territory of the Province of Río Negro the installation of nuclear power generation plants.

=== San Luis ===
- Provincial Law, Nº 5567
  - Article 1: Declare the territory of the San Luis Province a nuclear-free zone.

=== Santa Fe ===
- Provincial Law, Nº 10753
  - Article 1: It is forbidden in the Santa Fe Province, the installation of plants and/or temporary or permanent nuclear deposits.
  - Article 3: Declare the Santa Fe Province a nuclear-free zone.

=== Tierra del Fuego ===
- Provincial Constitution
  - Article 56: It is forbidden in the Province. 1 - Conducting tests or nuclear tests of any kind for military purposes. 2 - Generation of energy from nuclear sources. 3 - Introduction and disposal of nuclear, chemical, biological waste or any other type or nature proven to be toxic, hazardous or potentially in the future.

=== Tucumán ===
- Provincial Law, Nº 6253
  - Article 47: It is forbidden in the province: b) Generate energy from nuclear sources until the international scientific community works out an appropriate treatment for nuclear waste.

== See also ==
- National Atomic Energy Commission
- 2006 Argentine nuclear reactivation plan
- Argentina and weapons of mass destruction

== Notes ==
^a Dismantled 1984-1989 after a criticality accident. Fuel removed to the United States in 2007.
