= Beatriz Susana Cougnet de Roederer =

Argentine physicist (1930–2022)

- Born: Beatriz Susana Cougnet; 16 September 1930; Lausanne, Switzerland
- Died: 12 September 2022 (aged 91); Boulder, Colorado, US
- Education: University of Buenos Aires
- Occupation: Physicist
- Known for: Cosmic radiation and high-speed physics
- Spouse: Juan Gualterio Roederer
- Children: 4

Beatriz Susana Cougnet de Roederer (16 September 1930 – 12 September 2022) was a pioneer of Argentine physics, specializing in the field of cosmic radiation and high-speed physics.

== Biography ==
Beatriz Cougnet was born in Lausanne, Switzerland, but her parents, Fausto and Susana, were both Argentine citizens so she was raised in Argentina since the age of one. She studied physics and mathematics at the University of Buenos Aires (UBA) and obtained her M.Sc. degree on 18 December 1952. When the Argentine Atomic Energy Commission was created, Cougnet was one of the first four researchers hired to work on high-energy fundamental particle physics.

Cougnet made important contributions to Argentine science and is considered a pioneer in her field of research, together with Estrella Mazzoli de Mathov, Juana M. Cardoso, Adulio Cichini, Horacio Ghielmetti, Emma V. Pérez Ferreira, Juan G. Roederer and Pedro Waloschek. She also served as thesis director for a local doctoral student researching nuclear reactions recorded at the Bevatron particle accelerator in Berkeley, California.

Cougnet conducted research on cosmic radiation at the Nuclear Plates Laboratory of the National Atomic Energy Commission (CNEA) in Argentina, around 1950, laying the groundwork for the founding of the National Center for Cosmic Radiation (now called the Institute of Astronomy and Space Physics, IAFE) at the University of Buenos Aires in 1960. At the end of 1949, Cougnet went to Germany and visited the laboratory of Werner Heisenberg at the Max Planck Institute in Göttingen where she learned about the work with nuclear emulsions directed by Martin Teucher. In 1950–1951, Cougnet and Juan Roederer, still students, exposed nuclear plates with photographic emulsions at high altitudes in the Andes mountains of Argentina. In that way, they obtained the second reported detection of subatomic particles called pi mesons, or pions. In early 1953, Cougnet and Roederer undertook the last expedition to expose emulsions at higher geomagnetic latitudes, on the slopes of the Lanín volcano near Bariloche, Argentina.

In June 1966, the political landscape in Argentina turned dangerous because of the coup d'état, so she and Roederer emigrated to Colorado in the United States with their four children and three surviving parents.

In 1977, Roederer accepted the position of director of the Geophysical Institute of the University of Alaska, in Fairbanks, prompting Cougnet, Roederer and a few family members to move again. Later, after living in Alaska for 37 years, Cougnet and Roederer were asked by their children to move back to Colorado.

== Personal life ==
Beatriz was the wife of Juan G. Roederer, an Italian-born Argentine physicist, whom she met during her high school studies, and with whom she had four children: Ernesto, Irene, Silvia and Mario. After their third child was born in 1958, she left research and devoted herself to family care. She died in Boulder, Colorado at the age of 91 in 2022.
