= Diabolic (band) =

American death metal band

- Origin: Tampa Bay, Florida, United States
- Genre: Death metal
- Years active: 1996–present
- Labels: Fadeless Records, Conquest/Hammerheart Records, Century Media//Olympic Records, Deathgasm Records

Diabolic is an American death metal band from Tampa Bay, Florida, United States, that bassist/vocalist Paul Ouellette, drummer Aantar Lee Coates and guitarist Brian Malone founded in 1996.

== Biography ==
Diabolic started in 1996, when drummer Aantar Coates (Exmortis, Horror of Horrors, Unholy Ghost, Blastmasters) teamed up with guitarist Kelly McLauchlin (Pessimist, Unholy Ghost, Possessed) to record the first 4-song Diabolic demo. Although this demo was never officially released, and sent only to underground contacts, it marked the beginning of the band's success.

By January 1997, Coates had relocated to Tampa, Florida, and after forming the first complete lineup, recorded and released the demo City of the Dead. This demo got the band noticed in the worldwide underground press, and was later released as MCD on Fadeless Records. By 1998, Diabolic made their live debut opening for Vader in Tampa, Florida, followed by Milwaukee Metalfest XII. The lineup included Coates on drums, Paul Ouellette on lead guitar and vocals, Brian Malone on lead guitars, and Ed Webb on bass.

In 1999, Diabolic recorded their debut full-length album, Supreme Evil. This CD, mastered at Morrisound Recording Studios in Tampa and featuring the artwork of Joe Petagno (Motörhead, Marduk, Krisiun), was released on Conquest/Hammerheart Records, received good reviews, and established an international underground following for the band. More live shows followed, and the band continued gaining notoriety and writing for their next release.

The following year, Diabolic recorded their second full-length album, Subterraneal Magnitude, released on Conquest/Hammerheart Records. Produced by Juan "Punchy" Gonzalez (Morbid Angel, Terrorizer), this album expanded the Diabolic sound to new extremes. By this time, vocalist Paul Ouellette had switched to bass, and the band had recruited Brian Hipp (Brutality, Cradle of Filth, Acheron) on lead guitars. It featured Petagno's art.

Diabolic was enlisted for the "Death Metal Massacre Tour 2000", opening for Cannibal Corpse, God Dethroned and Hate Eternal, playing to sold-out venues for four weeks, all across the USA. In 2001, Diabolic was chosen for the Metal Maniacs "Xmass Ball Tour 2001", opening for Enslaved and Macabre (which included a one-off with Lacuna Coil), followed by a 3-week North American Tour of the U.S. and Canada, supporting Marduk and Amon Amarth. Later that same year, Diabolic was picked to open several dates across the southern U.S. with death metal band Morbid Angel.

In 2002, Diabolic signed to Century Media/Olympic Records and released their third CD, Vengeance Ascending. Produced by Juan "Punchy" Gonzalez, this extreme metal album again featured the art of Joe Petagno, and new lead guitarist Jerry Mortellaro. The band departed on a month-long, sold-out U.S. tour supporting Dimmu Borgir, Cryptopsy, and Krisiun, solidifying the band as an up-and-coming death metal act. In November 2002, Diabolic made their European debut, for a month-long tour of 10 countries in support of Behemoth, Deströyer 666, and Deicide.

By 2003, and after the European tour, the band went through several lineup changes. The original lineup had all been replaced. Led by sole remaining original member Brian Malone, the band recorded their fourth full-length CD, Infinity Through Purification. Produced by Neil Kernon (Cannibal Corpse, Nile, Judas Priest) and released on Century Media Records, but without the trademark Diabolic of the past, it garnered lackluster reviews. The band had secured an opening slot on Deicide's upcoming U.S. tour, but soon after the album's release, it was announced that the band was breaking up permanently.

Diabolic original members Aantar Cotes (drums), Paul Ouellette (vocals, bass) along with guitarists Kelly McLauchlin (Pessimist, Unholy Ghost, Possessed) and Jerry Mortellaro (also formerly of Diabolic) formed a new band, Unholy Ghost, in 2003. The band signed to Century Media/Olympic Recs, and released the debut CD Torrential Reign, produced by Juan "Punchy" Gonzalez (Morbid Angel, Terrorizer) as well as recorded a video for "Under Existence", released on Century Media Europe DVD. The band played several high profile fests such as "Sun 'n' Steel" Florida Metalfest, Snakenet.com "Metal Nation" Fest, Las Vegas Metalfest, and "Gathering of the Bestial Legions" Metalfest in Los Angeles. Despite its apparent success, Unholy Ghost disbanded in 2005. Lead guitarist Kelly McLauchlin went back to Pessimist, and Coates went on to form another new band, Blastmasters.

By 2006, and amidst legal battles over the rights to use the name, Diabolic had reformed. Coates, along with Unholy Ghost/Pessimist guitarist Kelly McLauchlin and parts of the Blastmasters lineup (RJ/guitars and Jesse Jolly/bass, Vox), recorded their comeback EP, Possessed By Death in 2007. After re-enlisting original bassist/vocalist Paul Ouellette in 2008, the band recorded the EP Chaos in Hell. Both self-produced EPs were recorded at DOW studios in Tampa, Florida with long-time producer Juan "Punchy" Gonzalez. The band signed to Deathgasm Records in 2008, and released both EPs on one CD, Chaos in Hell/Possessed by Death. Diabolic played select shows in Tampa with Monstrosity and Six Feet Under, and festivals including "Mayhem in May" in Louisville, Kentucky and "Gathering of the Bestial Legions III" Metalfest in Hollywood, California.

The band returned to DOW Studios and longtime producer Juan "Punchy" Gonzalez (Morbid Angel, Terrorizer, Unholy Ghost) and in 2010, Diabolic released the album Excisions of Exorcisms on Deathgasm Records with a return to a core lineup that featured Coates (Unholy Ghost, Exmortis, Horror of Horrors, Blastmasters), original bassist/vocalist Paul Ouellette (Unholy Ghost), and lead guitarists Kelly McLauchlin (Unholy Ghost, Pessimist, Possessed) and Jeff Parrish (Blastmasters).

In April 2010, Diabolic was selected to open the first several dates of the Cannibal Corpse "Evisceration Plague" Tour (in place of 1349), including shows in Atlanta GA, Raleigh NC, Washington DC and Long Island, NY. The band then made festival appearances at Las Vegas Deathfest II and Hostile City Death Fest II in Philadelphia, PA.

Jeff Parrish died on February 14, 2013, from a heart attack in his sleep. He was 40 years old.

Diabolic is writing new music for the next CD.

== Lineup ==
- Aantar Lee Coates - drums (1996–2002, 2004–present)
- Kelly McLauchlin - guitars (1996–1997, 2006–2010, 2015–present)
- Jerry Mortellaro - guitars (2001–2002, 2016–present)
- Paul Ouellette - bass, vocals (1998–2002, 2007–2010, 2012–present), guitars (1997–1998, 2007)

=== Former members ===
- Brian Malone - guitars (1997–2004)
- Bryan Hipp - guitars (2000–2001)
- Eric Hersemann - guitars (2002–2004)
- Jeff Parrish - guitars (2007–2013)
- RJ Reinagle - guitars (2006–2007, 2011–2015)
- Rutger A. Cole - bass (1996–1997)
- Jesse Jolly - bass, vocals (2006)
- John C. Hall III - bass, vocals (2011–2012)
- Edwin Webb - bass (1997–1998, 1998–2000, 2003–2007), vocals (1998–2000, 2003–2008)
- Tony Blakk - bass, vocals (2008–2009)
- Gaël Barthelemy - drums (2003–2004)

== Discography ==
- Supreme Evil (1998)
- City of the Dead EP (1999)
- Subterraneal Magnitude (2001)
- Vengeance Ascending (2001)
- Infinity Through Purification (2003)
- Shellfire and Tombstones (2006)
- Possessed By Death EP (2007)
- Chaos In Hell EP (2007)
- Excisions of Exorcisms (2010)
- Mausoleum of the Unholy Ghost (2020)
- Blastmasters Twisted Metal (2024)
