= National Atomic Energy Commission =

Argentine government agency

Coordinates: 34°32′22″S 58°27′55″W

- Comisión Nacional de Energía Atómica

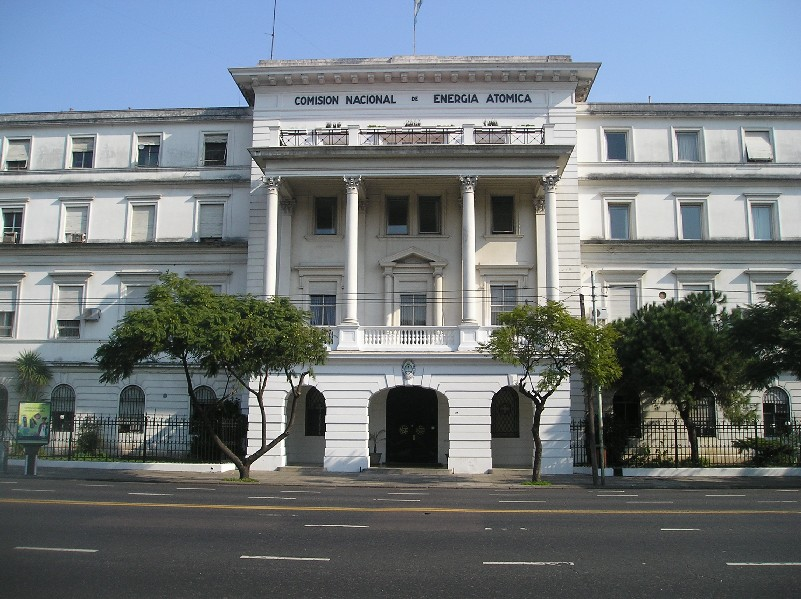
- CNEA headquarters in Buenos Aires

Agency overview
- Formed: 31 May 1950
- Headquarters: Av. del Libertador 8250, Buenos Aires
- Agency executives: Adriana Cristina Serquis, President; Diego Fabián Hurtado de Mendoza, Vicepresident
- Parent agency: Ministry of Economy
- Website: argentina.gob.ar/cnea

The National Atomic Energy Commission (Spanish: Comisión Nacional de Energía Atómica, CNEA) is the Argentine government agency in charge of nuclear energy research and development.

The agency was created on 31 May 1950, with the mission of developing and controlling nuclear energy for peaceful purposes in the country.

CNEA's facilities include the Bariloche Atomic Centre (in San Carlos de Bariloche), Constituyentes Atomic Centre (in Buenos Aires), and Ezeiza Atomic Centre (in Ezeiza, Buenos Aires Province). CNEA operates research reactors at each of these sites.

== History ==
Officially established by President Juan Perón's Decree No 10.936, CNEA filled the need for a state organ to oversee the funding of the Huemul Project in Bariloche. Before CNEA came into being, the project was funded by the Dirección de Migraciones. In practice CNEA had only four members (Juan Domingo Perón, González, Mendé and Ronald Richter). In 1951, decree 9697 created another agency, the Dirección Nacional de la Energía Atómica (DNEA), also under González, to do research on atomic energy in Buenos Aires (González left CNEA in April 1952 and was replaced by Iraolagoitía) until 1955. After being assessed by two review panels in 1952, the Huemul Project was closed and Richter was no longer a CNEA member. Research in physics and technology continued in Bariloche, but no longer along Richter's original line.

Admiral Oscar Armando Quihillalt was the first director of the National Atomic Energy Commission, and was also an important participant in the International Atomic Energy Agency.

In 1955, José Antonio Balseiro, a research scientist and member of the first review panel on the Huemul Project, took over the recently created Instituto de Física de Bariloche, now Instituto Balseiro, which used Richter's facilities in the mainland, but abandoned the buildings in Huemul Island.

In 1956 Argentina's uranium resources were nationalized with the Commission controlling prospecting, production, and marketing. A yellowcake (uranium oxide) production capability was created that could support future plans for reactors. However, in accord with three presidential decrees of 1960, 1962 and 1963, Argentina supplied its initial production of about 90 tons of unsafeguarded yellowcake to Israel to fuel its Dimona reactor, creating the fissile material for Israel's first nuclear weapons.

The facilities in Buenos Aires were expanded after the closure of the Huemul Project, and by the 1960s became larger in terms of size and expenditure than those in Bariloche. It was the Constituyentes research centre that the first Latin American research reactor was built (1957), the RA-1 Enrico Fermi.

The 335-MWe Atucha I designed by Germany's (Siemens) was completed in 1974. In 1984 the 600-MWe Embalse designed by Canadian CANDU started its commercial operation.

In 1995 CNEA's functions where divided into newly created separate organizations such as the Nuclear Regulatory Authority (Autoridad Regulatoria Nuclear - ARN), which supervises nuclear safety in the country, and the Nucleoeléctrica Argentina - NASA, the company that operates the two completed nuclear power reactors. Today, CNEA mainly focuses on research and development of nuclear and related technologies.

In 2001 the original 1956 Directory structure of a President and five members designated by the National Executive authority was reduced, eliminating four positions of the Directory by Decrees 1065–01 and 1066–01.

On 2010 CNEA reopened the Enriched uranium plant at Pilcaniyeu inaugurated on 1983 but closed in the 1990s

In 2014 692-MWe Atucha II, also a Siemens design, started operating besides Atucha I. Since then Argentina operates three pressurized heavy-water reactors (PHWR), that use heavy water as moderator and coolant and unenriched natural uranium as fuel, for the generation of electricity.

Also in 2014, CNEA begun construction of the world's first small modular reactor (SMR), the CAREM-25 a small (25 MWe) pressurized water reactor (PWR) that unlike all previous power reactors in the country has been totally designed and developed domestically. It will use low-enrichment uranium as fuel and light water as coolant and moderator, a first for the country that traditionally used PHWRs designs.

In December 2015 a new uranium enrichment plant to manufacture fuel for Argentina's nuclear plants, located in Pilcaniyeu, was inaugurated. The plant will use both gaseous diffusion and more modern laser techniques.

== Research, development, production and educational activities ==
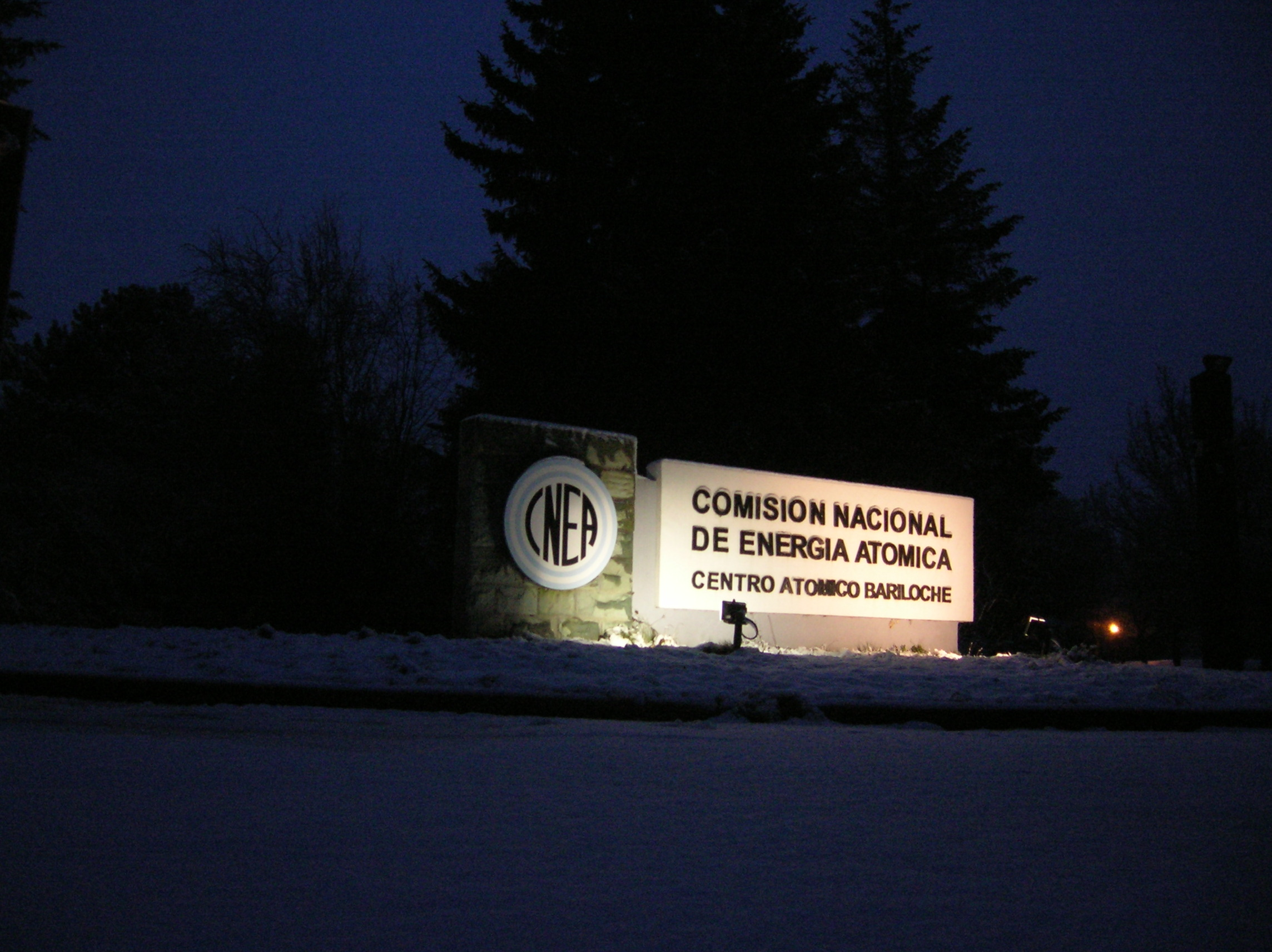
Centro Atómico Bariloche entrance.

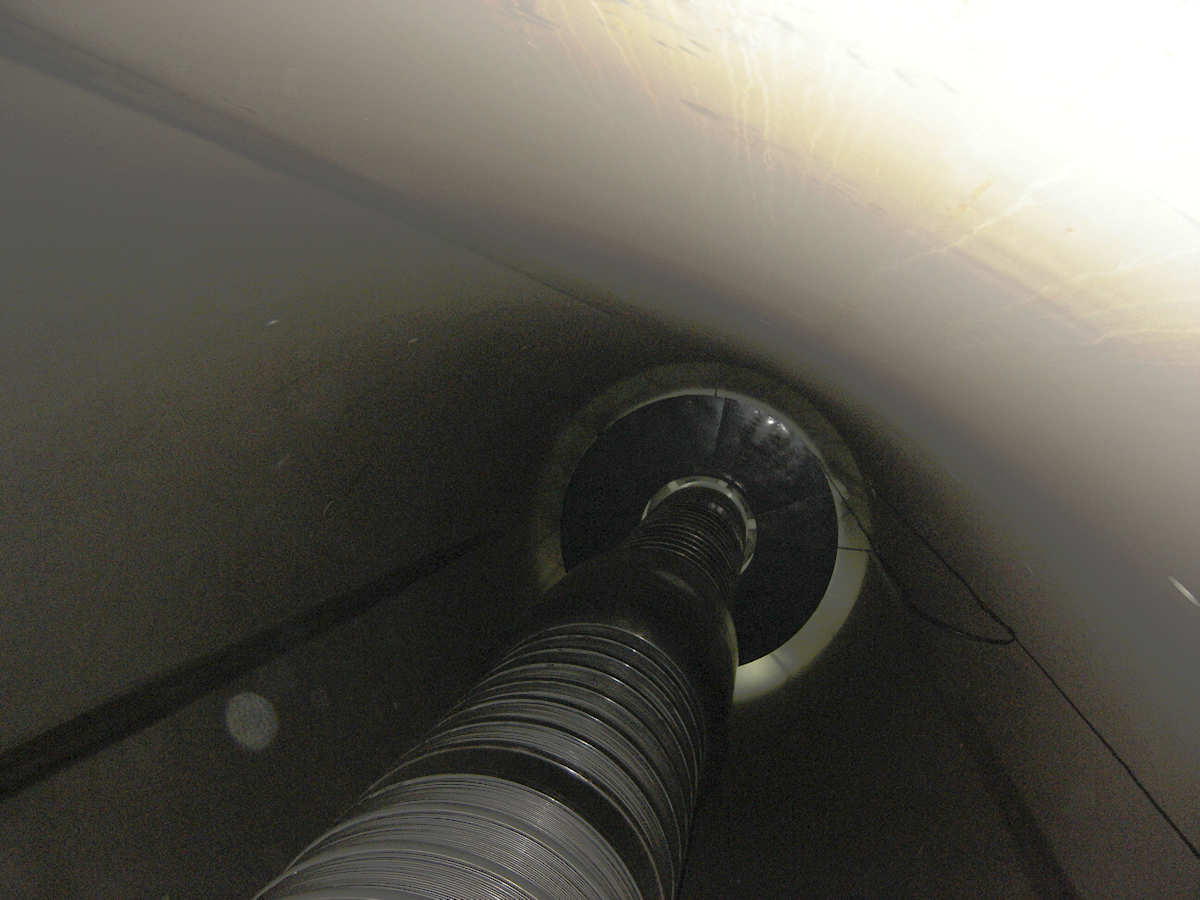
Tandar Particle accelerator inside

Although CNEA HQ is located in Buenos Aires city most of CNEA's activities are concentrated at three other sites

- Centro Atómico Constituyentes, San Martín, Buenos Aires province

Its premises contain the first nuclear reactor in Latin America RA-1 that went critical on 17 January 1958. Its researchers not only pioneered the construction of research reactors in Argentina, but also formed its leading groups in metallurgy, physics and chemistry. The Tandar accelerator is a large tandem Van de Graaff type facility dedicated to nuclear physics, condensed matter physics and medical research. It houses facilities for the development and building of research nuclear reactors fuels. Its academic unit, the Instituto Sábato, focused in Materials Science grants Licenciado, MSc and PhD degrees in association with the Universidad de San Martín.

- Centro Atómico Bariloche, Bariloche, Rio Negro province

Its academic unit the Instituto Balseiro, an association with the Universidad Nacional de Cuyo trained hundred of physicists and nuclear engineers since its creation as Instituto de Física de Bariloche in 1955. Its researchers published hundreds of peer-reviewed scientific papers and provided important contributions to applied and basic science. Its RA-6 reactor was built to train Balseiro's nuclear engineering students as well to conduct basic and applied research.

- Centro Atómico Ezeiza, Ezeiza, Buenos Aires province

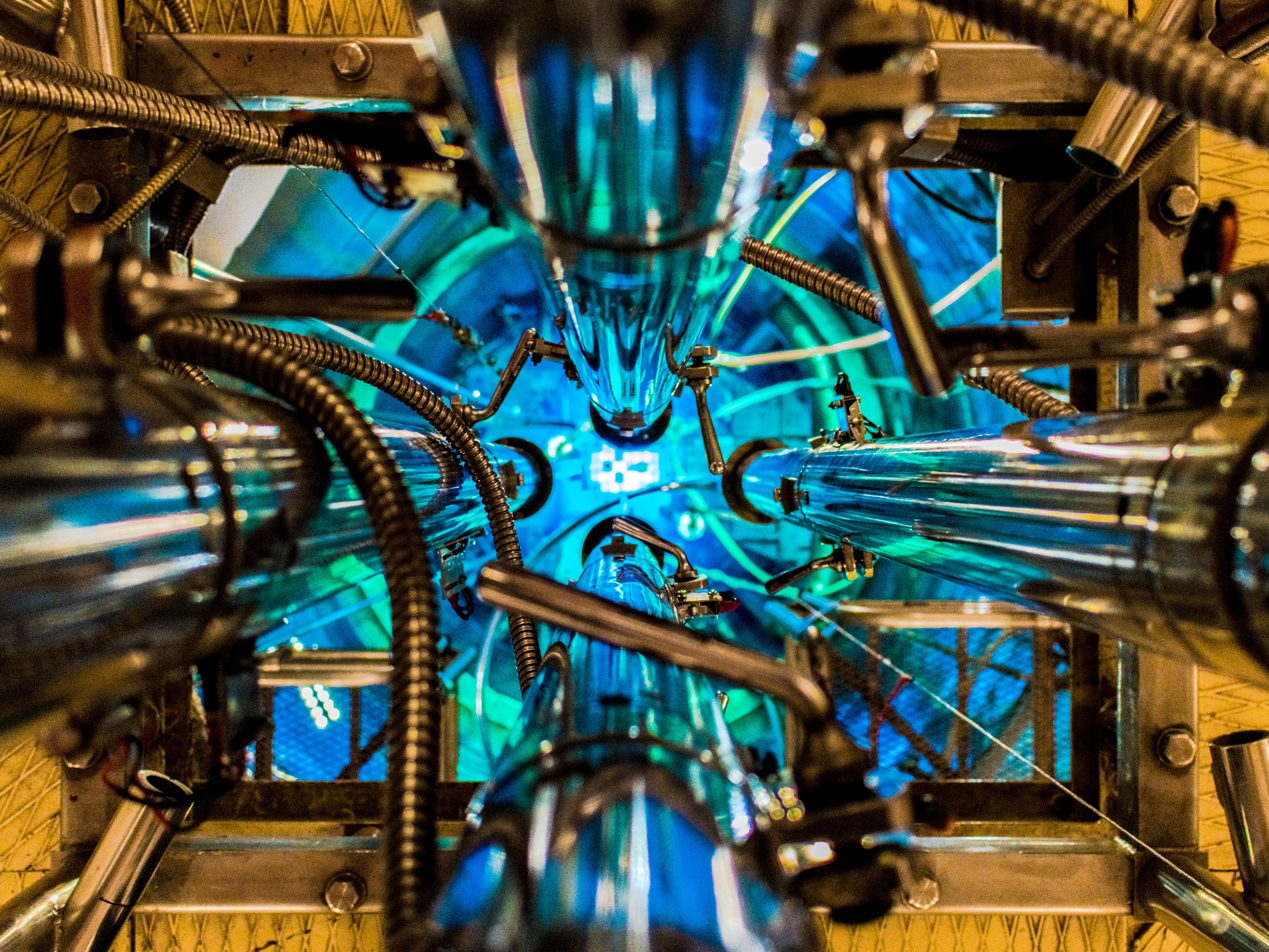
Overhead view of the core of the RA-3 Research and Production Reactor (CNEA, Argentina)

Its RA-3 research/production reactor produces all nuclear isotopes for medicine used in Argentina and supplies neighbouring countries as well. Other research facilities include . Its academic unit Instituto Beninson in association with the Universidad de San Martín is focused on the applications of nuclear technologies, has an engineering degree on the subject, has many post-graduate degrees as well as granting PhDs on connected areas.

There are other smaller sites around the country concerned with particular activities each

- CAREM construction site, Lima, Buenos Aires province
- Complejo Tecnológico Pilcaniyeu, 60 km from Bariloche, Rio Negro province
- Fundación Escuela de Medicina Nuclear, Mendoza city, Mendoza province
- Fundación Centro de Diagnóstico Nuclear, Buenos Aires city
- Instituto Roffo - Centro de Medicina Nuclear (IRMN), Buenos Aires city
- Hospital de Clínicas - Centro de Medicina Nuclear (HCMN), Buenos Aires city
- Complejo Fabril Arroyito Planta Industrial de Agua Pesada (PIAP), Arroyito, Neuquén province
- Complejo Minero Fabril San Rafael (CMSR), San Rafael, Mendoza province
- Regional Patagonia, Trelew, Chubut province
- Regional Noroeste, Salta city, Salta province
- Regional Cuyo, Mendoza city, Mendoza province
- Regional Centro, Córdoba city, Córdoba province

The CNEA currently holds two U.S. patents(see external links)

== Spinoffs ==
Although power reactors in the 100-megawatt range have not been built by Argentina on its own, INVAP S.E., a company owned by the Río Negro Province, started by graduates of the Instituto Balseiro in 1976, has exported research reactors to Peru, Algeria, Egypt and most recently Australia (2000). The Australian reactor, OPAL, featuring a core power of 20 MW became operational in 2006, reaching full power in November of that year.

== See also ==
- Nuclear energy in Argentina
- Sabato Institute of Technology
- INVAP
- International Atomic Energy Agency
- Huemul Project
- Emma Pérez Ferreira
