= CAREM =

Modular nuclear reactor in Argentina

Coordinates: 33.9677°S 59.2130°W

CAREM logo

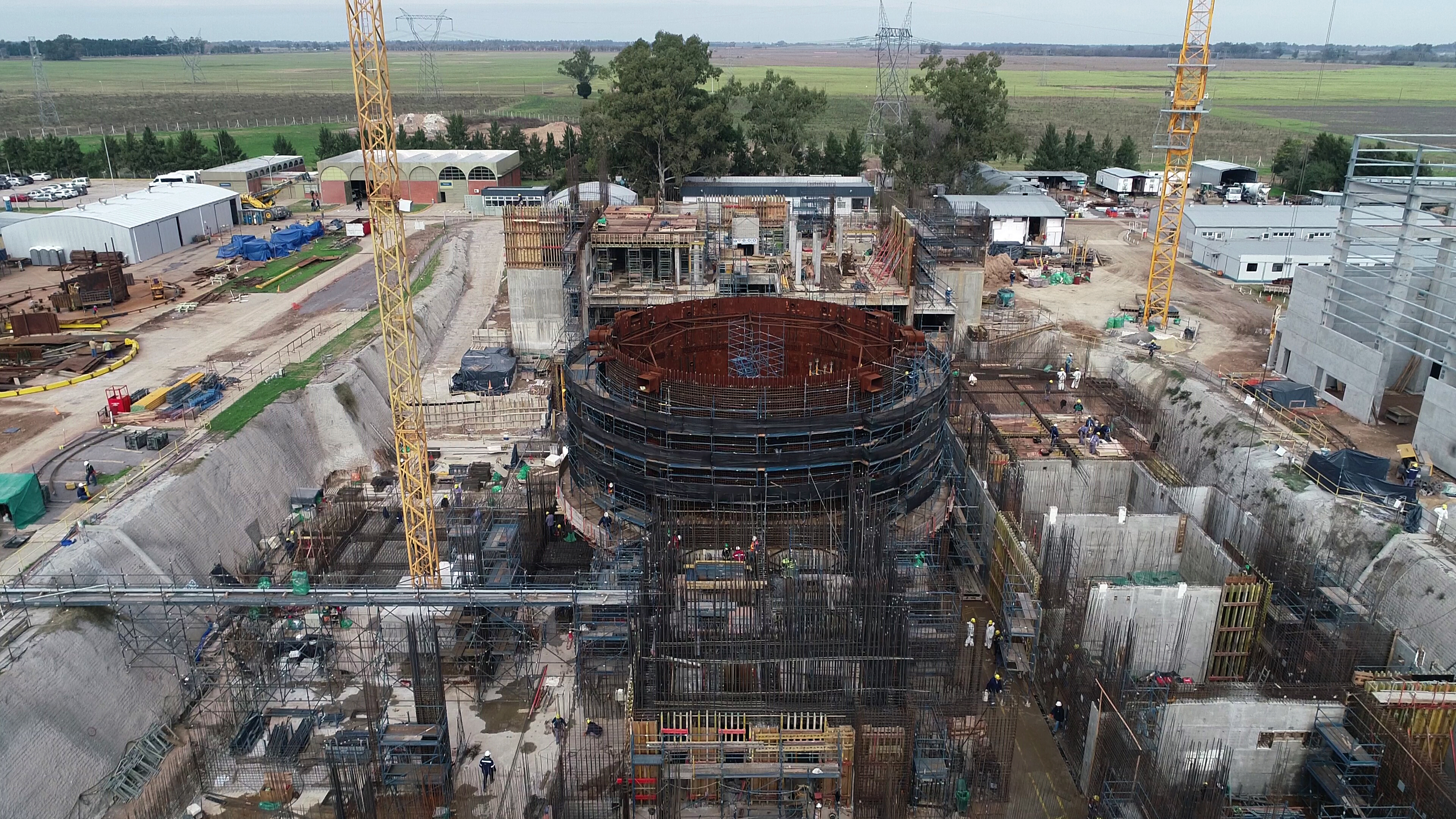
Status of the construction of the CAREM plant in July 2019

CAREM (Spanish: Central Argentina de Elementos Modulares) is a small modular reactor for electrical power generation under construction since 2014, near the city of Zárate, in the northern part of Buenos Aires province beside the Atucha I Nuclear Power Plant. As of 2026, the status of the CAREM-25 prototype is heavily paralyzed and mired in severe technical and financial crises. A panel of nuclear safety, thermo-hydraulics, and reactor physics experts officially concluded that CAREM's detailed engineering could not guarantee operational safety and was “technically unproven” even after four decades of development.

== Design ==
The reactor was integrally designed by CNEA (National Atomic Energy Commission) based on Germany's 1964 Otto Hahn's ship reactor, being the first power reactor redesigned by the country. It is basically a simplified pressurized water reactor (PWR) designed to have an electrical output of 25MW for the first prototype, 100MW in the following one. It is an integral reactor – the coolant system is inside the reactor vessel – so that the entire plant operates at the same pressure. This design minimizes the risk of loss-of-coolant accidents (LOCA). Its fuel is uranium oxide with a ^{235}U enrichment of 3.4% that needs to be replaced annually. The primary coolant system uses natural circulation, so there are no pumps required, which provides inherent safety against core meltdown, even in accident situations, although there are other technical aspects that compromise the overall system (see 'Challenges' below).

== History ==
The CAREM reactor concept relies on the Otto Hans ship's nuclear reactor, a design from the 1960s. In the 1970s, it was presented as a viable design for a nuclear submarine to the Argentine Navy, a functionality to which is unsuited, and for which not even testing facilities (e.g., moving platform for the reactor) have been built in Argentina.

Given its inadequacy for a modern naval program, in 1984, the reactor concept was presented publicly during an IAEA conference in Peru. For political reasons the project was halted but was relaunched by the 2006 Argentine nuclear reactivation plan, for land applications only.

The 25 MWe prototype version of CAREM currently being built will be followed by a second one of 100–200 MWe to be installed in Formosa Province.

As of 2013, the first prototype was planned to receive its first fuel load in 2017. First concrete was poured in February 2014.

As of 2016, the completion of the project was scheduled for the end of 2018. Cost has been estimated to US$446-700 million. As of 2018, the start date was deferred to 2020.

In November 2019, construction was halted due to late payments to the contractor, design changes, and late delivery of technical documentation. A new contract for finishing the concrete structures of the reactor was awarded in November 2021.

In September 2024, construction had once again halted due to the mass layoff of 153 construction workers. This is projected to be due to a lack of sufficient funding. Union representatives claimed that construction is 85% complete.

In spite of the halting of this project, between 2011 and 2018, a group from the CAB (Bariloche Atomic Center) of the CNEA developed the conceptual engineering of a PWR (Compact Nuclear Reactor) suitable for the propulsion of a national nuclear submarine. This project was also suspended without any justification despite the excellent results achieved.

== Challenges ==
In an article published in 2014, José Converti, a PhD Engineer and Professor Emeritus of Engineering at the Balseiro Institute, criticized the CAREM reactor project from various perspectives: technical, management, institutional, commercial, and overall nuclear policy. Technically, the core critiques center on the reactor's accumulation of unproven, highly complex technological innovations within a single design, which he views as a systemic engineering failure. He argues that the project abandoned conventional, globally validated nuclear engineering designs (e.g., traditional PWR) to pursue an overly ambitious "innovative" design, leading to chronic delays and staggering expenditures. A major technical concern is the uncertainty surrounding the Critical Heat Flux (CHF); because the reactor relies purely on natural convection rather than mechanical pumps, critics argue that the system lacks precise empirical mathematical models to fully predict thermal behavior during sudden power fluctuations.

Furthermore, Converti highlights significant risks regarding the reactor's internal components, specifically the integrated steam generators and the internal hydraulic control rod mechanisms. By placing the steam generators inside the pressure vessel—a configuration visually and architecturally reminiscent of compact Russian nuclear submarine technology—the reactor achieves a small footprint but creates a maintenance nightmare, as fixing material fatigue or tube leaks becomes exponentially more difficult than in standard civilian reactors. Combined with an unproven internal hydraulic system that lacks a history of consistent testing under real, high-temperature operating conditions, Converti concludes that the CAREM has mutated into an unviable, over-engineered chimera rather than a commercial success.

== Summary of Testing Status ==
- Critical Heat Flux (CHF) & Thermo-hydraulics: Substantiated by scaled laboratory models, but unproven at full scale.
- Internal Hydraulic Control Rod Mechanisms: Partially substantiated by cold/component tests, but unproven under full high-temperature operation.
- Integrated Steam Generators (Helical Design): Component manufacturing is proven, but long-term structural reliability is unproven; testing and repair can become extremely difficult.
- Self-Pressurization: Substantiated by computational models, but unproven in practice.

== See also ==
- List of small modular reactor designs
