= 1917 (band) =

Argentine band

Background information
- Origin: Lima, Buenos Aires, Argentina
- Genres: Death metal, thrash metal
- Years active: 1994–present
- Members: Alejandro Sabransky; Mario Mansilla

1917 is an Argentine extreme metal band formed in 1994. Their music is rooted in death metal, and incorporates elements of thrash metal and black metal.

== History ==
=== 1994–1998 ===
The band was founded in mid-1994 in Lima (Buenos Aires, Argentina) by musician and writer Alejandro Sabransky, originally under the name N.N. 1917. After shortening their name to 1917, they released their debut demo tape, Bienvenido a la Nada, in 1996. Following initial lineup changes, the band independently recorded and released their debut studio album, Inti Huacay, in 1998. The album was subsequently reviewed by underground publications in neighboring countries such as Uruguay and Bolivia.

=== 1999–2001 ===
In 1999, 1917 transitioned into a power trio, with guitarist Alejandro Sabransky assuming vocal duties. During this period, the band contributed tracks to various international underground compilation albums across Latin America and Europe before entering a brief hiatus due to further lineup changes.

=== 2002–2006 ===
In 2002, Sabransky reorganized the project as a duo alongside returning bassist Pansa, opting to utilize programmed drums for studio tracking—a production workflow the band maintained moving forward. Under this format, they released their second album, Genesis & Horror (2002), with the independent label Hurling Metal Records acting as distributor. According to reviews, the album marked a transition toward a more technical and eclectic death metal style, highlighting the use of Spanish vocals layered over complex musical arrangements. That same year, the band participated in the regional split album Sudamérica Brutal 2.

Following regional live performances with session musicians, 1917 released their third album, Vision, in 2004. The material received attention from South American and European media, and was subsequently reissued for the Peruvian and Mexican markets through Undermetal Records and Concreto Records respectively.

In 2005, the duo released Neo-Ritual, which garnered further press coverage, particularly within the Latin American scene, and a parallel Mexican reissue by Concreto Records.

In 2006, the band participated in tribute albums dedicated to Slayer (Al Sur Del Abismo) and Death (Mordiendo el Dolor), both released by Hurling Metal, followed by the release of the compilation CD Testimonial. Shortly after, the bassist and drummer departed from the project.

=== 2007–2014 ===
Following the lineup dissolution, Sabransky maintained 1917 as a one-man band. Under this studio format, he recorded and released Vox Fatum (2007), which was re-released in Mexico by Concreto Records. This was followed by the studio albums Brutal Miserable Drama (2010) and Inexorable (2013). The 2010 release featured guest appearances by international extreme metal musicians, including Acho from Social Shit, S.A.S. de L'Argilière from Misanthrope, and Mike Browning. Also in 2010, the band participated in a tribute album to Carcass entitled Certificado de Muerte. Concurrently, Argentine label Disembodied Records issued the multi-part compilation series Actum Tempus to collect archival and unreleased material.

=== 2015–2020 ===
In 2015, bassist Mario Mansilla joined 1917 as a permanent member, while touring musicians were recruited to resume live performances. The band subsequently released the studio album Implacable Utopia (2016), and performed at regional festivals, sharing the stage with international acts such as Nile in 2017.

In 2018, they released Sessiones, a multimedia live-in-the-studio package consisting of a DVD and CD. In 2019, Sabransky and Mansilla recorded 1917's ninth album, Novem and a 7-inch vinyl single titled Sanguinaria Misericordia.

=== 2021–Present ===
In 2021, the band released their tenth studio album, Omnicrisis. This album featured guest appearances such as S.A.S. de L'Argilière from Misanthrope, Tommy Talamanca from Sadist and Lucas Bravo from Lethal (now in Horcas). The album received reviews highlighting its complex arrangements and reflections on the contemporary global context.

In 2022, they released Cruel Dimension, which was later re-released in Mexico by Metal Inside Records. Cruel Dimension was included in Jedbangers magazine's year-end list of the best Argentine releases of 2022. That same year, they participated in the compilation album and retrospective documentary Death Metal Advance II: Viejas Legiones, featuring active extreme metal bands originating from the 1990s Argentine scene.

The band subsequently released Sonus Irae in 2023, followed by their thirteenth full-length studio release, Factor Bestial, in 2025. In August 2026 they released an EP entitled Execratio Perpetua.

== Musical style and themes ==
1917's musical style is mainly grounded in death metal but also blends elements of technical thrash, black metal, and doom metal. Critics noted that the band's early work featured a multifaceted approach that integrated various extreme metal subgenres without aligning definitively with a single traditional style. The debut album garnered attention for its inclusion of traditional indigenous wind instruments in its intro and outro tracks, as well as for its title, Inti Huacay, a Quechua phrase translating to "Tears of the Sun". Music critics noted that the band's lyrical approach features a dense, literary character, exploring themes such as philosophical skepticism, art, and a critical analysis of social dogmas.

== Reception and legacy ==
Since the release of their debut studio album in 1998, 1917 has maintained a continuous recording activity, releasing thirteen studio albums over nearly three decades. This output represents one of the most extensive discographies in Argentine metal. A significant portion of 1917's studio discography received international reissues, and later releases were distributed in Europe through G.U.C. (2010–2013) and Holy Records (2021–2025), with distributor credits appearing on physical editions.

In 1997, Alejandro Sabransky organized a compilation titled Memorias de Muerte, released as a pro tape and featuring underground metal bands from the Buenos Aires area, including 1917 itself. In 2002, Sabransky revived the project, which eventually developed into a compilation series that he continued organizing and coordinating. This project expanded beyond its original local scope to include numerous —mostly emerging— underground bands from different regions of Argentina, with 1917 contributing recordings to some installments throughout the series' history. By 2019, Memorias de Muerte had reached twelve volumes.

In 2019, the band was included in Songs of Injustice: Heavy Metal Music in Latin America, an audiovisual documentary and research project directed by social scientist Nelson Varas-Díaz at Florida International University, examining Latin American metal bands' resilience and relationship with their history and culture.

Also during 2019, a tribute album titled Versiones Apócrifas was released featuring interpretations of 1917 songs by artists from Argentina, Uruguay and Bolivia.

== Discography ==
=== Studio albums ===
- Inti Huacay (1998)
- Genesis & Horror (2002)
- Vision (2004)
- Neo-Ritual (2005)
- Vox Fatum (2007)
- Brutal Miserable Drama (2010)
- Inexorable (2013)
- Implacable Utopia (2016)
- Novem (2019)
- Omnicrisis (2021)
- Cruel Dimension (2022)
- Sonus Irae (2023)
- Factor Bestial (2025)

=== Other releases ===
==== EPs ====
- Execratio Perpetua (2026)

==== Demos ====
- Bienvenido a la Nada (1996)
- Promo 2005 (2005)

==== Split albums ====
- Sudamérica Brutal 2 (2002)

==== Singles ====
- El Danzar de los Decapitados / Bienvenido a la Nada (2009)
- Sanguinaria Misericordia (2019)
- Tras los Fríos Muros (2020)

==== Compilation albums ====
- Testimonial (2006)
- Actum Tempus (Part I) (2013)
- Actum Tempus (Part II) (2013)
- Cronología 1998-2018 (2018)

==== Box sets ====
- Manifiestos Iconoclastas (2016)
- Manifiestos Inquebrantables (2020)

==== Video releases ====
- Sessiones (DVD+CD, 2018)

== Band members ==
=== Current lineup ===
- Alejandro Sabransky – guitars (1994–present), lead vocals (2000–present), drum programming (2002–present), bass (2007–2014)
- Mario Mansilla – bass (2015–present)

=== Former members ===
- Juan "Pansa" Videla – bass (1994–1997, 2002–2006)
- Fernando Ruiz – drums (1994–2001)
- Marcos K. – lead vocals (1994–1999)
- Damián R. – bass (1998–2001)

=== Live musicians ===
- Eric Loiácomo – drums (2002–2006)
- Fede Fisura – drums (2015–2016)
- Javier Cufré – rhythm guitar (2015–2018)
- Javier Cuello – drums (2017–2018)

=== Guest studio musicians ===
- Acho (Social Shit) – bass on Brutal Miserable Drama (2010)
- Mike Browning (Nocturnus AD) – vocals on Brutal Miserable Drama (2010)
- S.A.S. de L'Argilière (Philippe Courtois) (Misanthrope, Argile) – guitar on Brutal Miserable Drama (2010), vocals on Omnicrisis (2021)
- Tommy Talamanca (Sadist) – guitar on Omnicrisis (2021)
- Lucas Bravo (ex-Lethal, Horcas) – guitar on Omnicrisis (2021)
