= Nocturnus =

American death metal band

- Also known as: Nocturnus AD
- Origin: Tampa, Florida, U.S.
- Genres: Death metal, progressive death metal, technical death metal
- Years active: 1987–1993, 1999–2002, 2013–2026
- Labels: Earache, Moribund, Season of Mist, Combat, Relativity, Profound Lore
- Members: Mike Browning; Demian Heftel; Belial Koblak; Josh Holdren; Kyle Sokol

Nocturnus, also known as Nocturnus AD, was a Florida death metal band formed in 1987 in Tampa, Florida by vocalist and drummer Mike Browning (ex–Morbid Angel).

== History ==
=== Formation ===
Drummer and vocalist Mike Browning formed Nocturnus in 1987, following the breakup of his old band, Incubus. The band consisted of Browning, former Incubus guitarist Gino Marino, and former Agent Steel bassist Richard Bateman. The band began working on material and added second guitarist Vincent Crowley. This lineup recorded a self-titled demo in 1987. Crowley quit (going on to form Acheron) and was replaced with Marino's cousin Mike Davis. Bateman quit to join Nasty Savage.

Nocturnus added bassist Jeff Estes and keyboard player Louis Panzer in 1988. Panzer's addition made the band unique in the death metal scene. He provided an atmosphere that enhanced their science fiction–themed lyrics and image. This lineup put out the Science of Horror demo. In 1989, Marino quit and was replaced with Sean McNenney. Davis's and McNenney's fast, highly technical dueling guitar solos became a focal point of the band.

=== The Key ===
In 1989, thanks to Davis's friendship with Morbid Angel guitarist Trey Azagthoth, the band signed to Earache Records. The band recorded their debut album, The Key, with Tom Morris, and released the album in 1990. The album was characterized by an occult/sci-fi concept that blended Browning's and Davis's influences, guitar pyrotechnics, and space-age-ish keyboards. It became a death metal hit and spawned tracks such as "Standing In Blood" and "BC/AD (Before Christ/After Death)". The album featured backing vocals by Massacre vocalist Kam Lee. 70,000 copies have been sold worldwide.

During the recording of The Key, Estes developed an alcohol addiction that affected his bass playing. Davis played much of the bass on the album instead. Estes was fired and replaced with Jim O'Sullivan, with whom the band toured for The Key in 1991 in support of Bolt Thrower, before embarking on the Grindcrusher tour with Morbid Angel, Napalm Death, and Godflesh. O'Sullivan was fired following the tours.

=== Thresholds ===
In 1992, the band hired a full-time vocalist, former Tortured Soul singer Dan Izzo, to allow Browning to focus on drumming, and because Earache promised the band a music video if they recruited a "real" frontman. The band enlisted session bassist Chris Anderson to play on the album Thresholds.

As Browning became less involved in the songwriting, Thresholds' lyrics moved in a more sci-fi–oriented direction. The album was more relenting and diverse than The Key, and included the instrumental track "Nocturne in Bm", acoustic guitars in "Arctic Crypt", and exotic percussion in "Tribal Voudon". The album sold fewer copies than The Key, but was generally favorably received by critics and fans for its ambition and progressive direction. "Alter Reality" was released as a single with a music video, and "Arctic Crypt" and "Subterranean Infiltrator" became fan favorites. The band hired permanent bassist Emo Mowery (formerly of Malediction), and toured Europe for Thresholds, during which the band was unsatisfied because Earache's lack of promotion made the tour unprofitable.

After the band returned to the United States, musical differences between Browning and the rest of the band became apparent. This culminated in Sean McNenney and Louis Panzer going Browning's back and ensuring rights to the band name "Nocturnus". They asigned Mike Davis to this name, but not Izzo or Mowery. Browning was fired shortly after. Animosity lingers among the former bandmates. James Marcinek replaced Browning.

The new Nocturnus lineup began recording songs for a third album, which included "Mummified", "The Invertebrate Plague", "The Great Spot", and "Orbital Decay", all written by Davis, McNenney, and Panzer. Around this time, the band began to lose label support from Earache, and their contract was dropped. The new lineup put out a two-song, self-titled EP in 1993, which featured a recycled early song, "Possess The Priest", and the new "Mummified". Panzer, McNenney, and Marcinek departed the band after this, and the band split. During this time, most of the band members fell off the musical grid, except for Mike Davis's work on a project with Trey Azagthoth that was never released.

=== Ethereal Tomb ===
In the late 1990s, McNenney and Panzer began writing ambient metal riffs. Deciding that these new ideas could work as new Nocturnus material, they reunited with Davis and Emo Mowery, along with new drummer Rick Bizarro. In 1999, Nocturnus released the album Ethereal Tomb on Season of Mist. The album had a more refined and ambient sound than the band's previous work. In 2002, the band split up again.

=== Post–second breakup and Nocturnus AD ===
Since the dissolution of Nocturnus, Mowery has been the most active member. He has played in bands such as Leash Law in Florida. At one point, Panzer reformed an old band called Cry Blue, which Browning described as "Sting type music", though he was involved in the software industry and living in North Carolina. Currently, he is the executive director of North Carolina 8-1-1. Browning has been involved in a wide variety of projects, currently After Death, similar to a less technical Nocturnus. The other members have been inactive in music as far as is known. Guitarist Mike Davis was falsely rumored to have died in 2008, and is often falsely credited with playing guitar in Rob Halford's solo band, misattributed to be Halford's bassist of the same name.

The band has made two post-breakup releases, The Nocturnus Demos, a collection of the band's pre-Earache recordings, and Farewell To Planet Earth, a DVD of live shows from various periods.

In late 2008, Browning toured with his own band, After Death, under the Nocturnus name for two exclusive UK dates – one at BUSK in Birmingham and the other in London plus some European gigs.

In May 2013, Earache Records began a Kickstarter campaign to gather pledges for Thresholds to be re-released for the first time since its official release date in 1992 using the original DAT master tape, successfully reaching its goal in July. Also in 2013, After Death performed under the Nocturnus name once more for a Mexican tour. On September 24, 2013, it was announced that Nocturnus would play Maryland Deathfest 2014 and perform the album The Key in its entirety. Shortly after, the band reformed as Nocturnus AD, containing every member from After Death.

On May 24, 2019, the band released the album Paradox through Profound Lore Records. The follow-up album Unicursal was released on May 17, 2024.

On July 13, 2026, Profound Lore Records confirmed the passing of Mike Browning at the age of 62. With Browning's passing, former guitarist Vincent Crowley is the only surviving member from the band's original lineup.

== Style ==
Nocturnus' sound has been described as "daring and progressive." The band was known for its science-fiction–themed lyrics and use of keyboards, both of which were virtually unheard of in extreme metal at the time. The band's lyrics were said to "[offer] a refreshing alternative to death metal’s prevailing preoccupations with Satan and gore during those early years." The band's 1990 debut album is considered by some to be the first progressive death metal album. The band said, "There's only so fast you can play and there's only so heavy you can be without it all sounding the same, or without it all just being a blur, so you know, maybe we've opened up a whole new branch of direction [...] with the music. [...] As long as it keeps expanding and bands keep experimenting and doing different things, it's not going to die out."

== Members ==
=== Final line-up ===
- Mike Browning – drums, lead vocals (1987–1992, 2013–2026; died 2026)
- Demian Heftel – guitars (2013–2026)
- Belial Koblak – guitars, backing vocals (2013–2026)
- Josh Holdren – keyboards (2017–2026)
- Kyle Sokol – bass (2023–2026)

=== Former ===
- Mike Davis – guitars (1988–1993, 1999–2002)
- Sean McNenney – guitars (1989–1993, 1999–2002)
- Louis Panzer – keyboards (1988–1993, 1999–2002)
- Emo Mowery – bass (1992–1993, 1999–2002), lead vocals (1999–2002)
- Chris Bieniek – drums (2002)
- Dan Izzo – lead vocals (1991–1993)
- Gino Marino – guitars (1987–1988; died 2017)
- Vincent Crowley – guitars (1987)
- Richard Bateman – bass (1987; died 2018)
- Jeff Estes – bass (1988–1991)
- Jim O'Sullivan – bass (1991) (live only)
- Chris Anderson – bass (1991) (session only)
- James Marcinek – drums (1992–1993)
- Rick Bizarro – drums (1999–2002)
- Nocturnal – keyboards (2013–2017)
- Jason Kiss – keyboards (2017)
- Daniel Tucker – bass (2013–2022)

== Discography ==
=== Albums ===
- 1990 The Key
- 1992 Thresholds
- 1999 Ethereal Tomb
- 2019 Paradox (as Nocturnus AD)
- 2024 Unicursal (as Nocturnus AD)

=== EP ===
- 1993 Nocturnus

=== Demos ===
- 1987 Nocturnus (demo)
- 1988 The Science of Horror (demo)
- 2004 The Nocturnus Demos (compilation)

=== DVD ===
- 2004 Farewell to Planet Earth (DVD)
