= Bryan Hipp =

Metal guitarist active in the 1990s

Bryan Hipp (January 22, 1968 – October 21, 2006) was an extreme metal guitarist. He played in the bands Brutality (1993–1995), Cradle of Filth (1994–1995), Acheron (1998), Unholy Ghost, Diabolic (1999) and Blastmasters.

He was one of the many people to assume the live role of the fictional "Jared Demeter" during his time with Cradle of Filth; after leaving the band, he was replaced by Paul McGlone.

Hipp died on October 21, 2006, of a drug overdose.

== Discography ==
- Brutality - When the Sky Turns Black (CD, 1994)
- Diabolic - Subterraneal Magnitude (CD, 2001)
- After Death - Consumed by Fire/Sulphur, Mercury and Salt (Demo, 2002)
