= Ethereal Tomb =

Studio album by Nocturnus
- Released: October 1, 1999
- Recorded: 1999; Audio Lab Studios, Tampa, Florida, USA
- Genre: Death metal
- Length: 42:15
- Label: Season of Mist
- Producers: Greg Marchak, Nocturnus

Nocturnus chronology
Nocturnus (EP) (1993)	Ethereal Tomb (1999)	The Nocturnus Demos (2004)

Professional ratings
Review scores
Source	Rating
AllMusic	3/5 stars

Ethereal Tomb is the third and final full-length studio album from Florida death metal band, Nocturnus. It was released in 1999 on Season of Mist Records after nearly seven years since the band's last material, the Nocturnus EP was released. Emo Mowery had taken up vocal duties as well as bass, and Rick Bizarro played the drums.

A compilation album of early Nocturnus demos was released in 2004. However, this album remains their final studio outing to date.

== Track listing ==
No.	Title	Length
1.	"Orbital Decay"	4:54
2.	"Apostle of Evil"	4:09
3.	"Edge of Darkness"	4:51
4.	"The Killing"	5:25
5.	"Search for the Trident"	7:39
6.	"Paranormal States"	4:10
7.	"The Science of Horror"	6:47
8.	"Outland" (Instrumental)	4:17
Total length:		42:15

== Credits ==
Nocturnus

- Emo Mowery - vocals, bass guitar
- Mike Davis - lead guitar, rhythm guitar
- Sean McNenney - lead guitar, rhythm guitar
- Louie Panzer - keyboards
- Rick Bizarro - drums, percussion

Production

- Recorded in 1999 at Audio Lab Studios, Tampa, Florida, USA
- Produced by Greg Marchak and Nocturnus
- Engineered by Greg Marchak
