= Estrella Mazzoli de Mathov =

Argentine physicist

- Born: 23 March 1911; Argentina
- Died: 5 January 1991 (aged 79); Buenos Aires, Argentina
- Education: University of Buenos Aires (PhD)
- Scientific career
- Thesis: Absorption of cosmic radiation using lead and aluminum: obtaining a second maximum (1948)

Estrella A. Mazzoli de Mathov was an Argentinian physicist who was instrumental to cosmic ray research in Buenos Aires in 1949.

== Life and Doctoral Work ==
Estrella Mazzoli de Mathov earned her Ph.D. at the University of Buenos Aires (UBA) with a dissertation titled, Absorption of cosmic radiation using lead and aluminum: obtaining a second maximum (1948), under the direction of Teófilo Isnardi.

During her graduate studies, while conducting research for her doctoral thesis, Mathov began working with Geiger Müller counters, which are used for detecting and measuring ionizing radiation.

== Post Doctoral Work ==
After graduating, in March 1949, she traveled to Brazil for a scientific conference about cosmic ray detection and learned about new projects and techniques to detect cosmic rays. According to Roederer:

"A group of us studying natural science and mathematics at the University of Buenos Aires gathered to hear teaching assistant Estrella Mathov talk about her trip to Brazil. Estrella had just returned from a scientific conference that had been attended by many great cosmic-ray physicists, including Cecil Powell, Beppo Occhialini, and Brazil’s own César Lattes. With great enthusiasm, she was telling everybody about the new projects and techniques that were just emerging in cosmic-ray research. Since Estrella was already working with Geiger counters, she encouraged the few physics majors, including me, to get involved with particle detection using nuclear photographic emulsions. That new technique was particularly attractive because it did not require complex and costly electronic equipment."

To help her graduate students begin, she had returned from the conference with several unexposed plates. These plates were similar to ordinary photographic plates but had thick and ultra-fine grain emulsions. To make new ones, the students created their lab from a small storage space at the university. The advantage of Mathov's investigations was that plate preparation did not require complex or costly equipment.

Once a plate was exposed to the atmosphere at a high altitude and it was developed, the students used a borrowed high-magnification optical microscope to look for tell-tale traces of cosmic rays, which appeared as one or several rows of silver grain images showing the trajectories of the electrically charged particles that had passed through the plate. Once revealed, the traces could be analyzed to reveal the particle's electrical charge and energy.

In 1950–1951, Beatriz Cougnet and Juan G. Roederer, still students, exposed nuclear plates at high altitudes in the Andes mountains and obtained the second reported detection of subatomic particles called pi mesons, or pions.
