= Thresholds (album) =

Studio album by Nocturnus
- Released: May 26, 1992 (UK); August 18, 1992 (US)
- Recorded: December 1991
- Studios: Morrisound Recording, Tampa, Florida, US
- Genres: Death metal, technical death metal
- Length: 43:47
- Labels: Relativity, Earache
- Producers: Tom Morris; Nocturnus

Nocturnus chronology
The Key (1990)	Thresholds (1992)	Nocturnus (EP) (1993)

Professional ratings
Review scores
Source	Rating
Allmusic	3/5 stars

Thresholds is the second full-length studio album from Florida death metal band Nocturnus. It was released in 1992 by Earache Records.

== Background and release ==
"Alter Reality" was released as a single and featured a music video that received substantial airplay on MTV's Headbangers Ball. "Arctic Crypt" and "Climate Controller" also became notable fan favorites.

This was the last Nocturnus release to feature founding member Mike Browning, who was forcibly ejected shortly after its release. The remaining band members subsequently trademarked the Nocturnus name, preventing Browning from performing under the band's name or any of their music.

== Composition ==
Thresholds continued the experimental sound created on the first album and the line-up was expanded to a six-piece with the addition of vocalist Dan Izzo, allowing Mike Browning to concentrate solely on drums. Lyrical topics range from Earth's climate and global warming ("Climate Controller"), primitive religions ("Tribal Vodoun"), underwater species ("Aquatica") and extraterrestrial life ("Gridzone").

The production of Thresholds is considerably more polished than that of The Key. The music is also more complex and mature, with there being numerous breakdowns and tempo changes in every song. The band's musicianship has also advanced with each member exhibiting a new level of preciseness and technicality, with complex riffing and melodic solos. Dan Izzo's vocals are much deeper and clearer than Browning's and have been compared to the vocals of Max Cavalera of Sepultura.

== Track listing ==
No.	Title	Length
1.	"Climate Controller"	7:51
2.	"Tribal Vodoun"	5:17
3.	"Nocturne in B Minor" (Instrumental)	2:51
4.	"Arctic Crypt"	4:18
5.	"Aquatica"	7:17
6.	"Subterranean Infiltrator"	5:35
7.	"Alter Reality"	4:28
8.	"Gridzone"	6:06
Total length:		43:47

== Credits ==
- Dan Izzo - vocals
- Mike Davis - guitar
- Sean McNenney - guitar
- Louis Panzer - keyboards
- Mike Browning - drums, percussion
- Chris Anderson - bass guitar
- Recorded in December, 1991 at Morrisound Recording, Tampa, Florida, USA
- Produced by Tom Morris and Nocturnus
