= Mike Browning =

American drummer and vocalist (1964–2026)

Background information
- Born: Michael George Browning; May 26, 1964; Tampa, Florida, U.S.
- Died: July 13, 2026 (aged 62) Tampa, Florida, U.S.
- Genre: Death metal
- Occupation: Musician
- Instruments: Drums; vocals
- Years active: 1983–2026
- Formerly of: Morbid Angel; Nocturnus; Acheron

Michael George Browning (May 26, 1964 – July 13, 2026) was an American heavy metal drummer and vocalist.

== Life and career ==
Browning was born in Tampa, Florida, on May 26, 1964. He started to play drums at 13 years old. His main influences were Black Sabbath, Slayer, Angel Witch, Mercyful Fate and Celtic Frost.

Browning played in the early precursors to Morbid Angel, Ice and Heretic, which were formed in 1983. He was the former drummer-vocalist for death metal pioneers Morbid Angel. He played in the band from 1984 to 1986 and made one official recording with them, Abominations of Desolation; it was not released until 1991, years after Browning left the band. Browning had a very turbulent relationship with Morbid Angel guitarist Trey Azagthoth; Browning's exit from the band was apparently triggered by Azagthoth being involved in an affair with Browning's then-girlfriend, leading to an altercation between the two.

Following his departure from Morbid Angel, Browning remained active as the drummer-vocalist for bands in the Florida death metal scene, including Nocturnus, a technical/progressive-oriented death metal band featuring a keyboard player and science fiction-themed lyrics. Browning was the drummer and vocalist for the band on their album The Key (1990) and solely played drums on Thresholds before being fired from the band in 1993. Other projects he participated in during the 1980s and 1990s included Florida death metal bands Incubus and Acheron.

Browning then played in a band called After Death, with lyrics concerned with the occult and black magic. He was also involved in Devine Essence and Wolf and Hawk, with metal singer Lisa Lombardo.

In 2008, he released a solo album called "Mike Browning's Inner Workings – Trancemissions" at Pharmafabrik Recordings. In 2010, he featured as a guest on Chryseis's and 1917's albums.

He latterly played with a band called Nocturnus AD. Their debut album Paradox was released on May 24, 2019, followed by Unicursal on 2024, both on Profound Lore Records.

Browning lived in Tampa and had a collection of medieval weapons and Ancient Egyptian artifacts in his home. He was also interested in muscle cars and 3D graphic design. Browning had a daughter who was born in 2007. Browning died on July 13, 2026, at the age of 62.
