= The Key (Nocturnus album) =

Studio album by Nocturnus
- Released: October 1, 1990
- Recorded: June 1990
- Studios: Morrisound Studio, Florida
- Genre: Technical death metal
- Length: 46:56
- Labels: Combat, Earache
- Producers: Tom Morris, Nocturnus

Nocturnus chronology
The Key (1990)	Thresholds (1992)

Professional ratings
Review scores
Source	Rating
AllMusic	4/5 stars

The Key is the debut studio album by American death metal band Nocturnus. It was released on Earache Records on October 1, 1990.

== Background ==
Browning has claimed that he has not seen any royalties from either this album or its follow up since he was kicked out of the band, blaming both former band members and Earache Records.

== Composition ==
A concept album, The Key is centered on an occult (the influence of drummer/vocalist Mike Browning) meets sci-fi (influenced by guitarist Mike Davis) theme. The story follows a cyborg who travels back in time to the year 0 B.C. to assassinate Jesus Christ which leads to the destruction of Christianity (highlighted by the controversial track "Destroying the Manger") and the creation of a modern empire. In addition to their unusual lyrical content, the band employed the use of keyboards which was virtually unheard of at the time in the broader genre of death metal. The keyboards were generally used for song intros and more atmospheric purposes, however, and most of the album was based upon a more conventional guitar and drums approach, with Kam Lee of Massacre providing backing vocals. The album's instrumentation has been described as "more musical" than most death metal existing at the time. Due to the increased complexity and experimentation, some have considered the release to be the first progressive death metal album. Browning's vocals on the album have been described as "demonic." AllMusic assessed, "It wasn't unusual for mainstream metal and hard rock bands to use keyboards, but it was hardly typical in the underground world of death metal, thrash, and grindcore. Nocturnus, of course, didn't want to be typical."

== Reception and legacy ==
Alex Henderson of AllMusic said The Key is "among the more interesting death metal releases of 1990." Loudwire wrote, "even today, [the album] remains an awesome achievement, well ahead of its time."

== Track listing ==
No.	Title	Lyrics	Length
1.	"Lake of Fire"	Mike Browning	4:51
2.	"Standing in Blood"	Browning	4:13
3.	"Visions from Beyond the Grave"	Browning	4:00
4.	"Neolithic"	Browning, Mike Davis	4:40
5.	"Undead Journey"	Browning	4:16
6.	"B.C./A.D. (Before Christ/After Death)"	Browning	4:48
7.	"Andromeda Strain"	Browning, Davis	3:36
8.	"Droid Sector"	Browning, Davis	4:16
9.	"Destroying the Manger"	Lou Panzer, Browning, Davis	5:59
10.	"Empire of the Sands"	Browning, Davis	6:17
Total length:			46:56

== Personnel ==
=== Nocturnus ===
- Mike Browning – lead vocals, drums, percussion
- Mike Davis – lead and rhythm guitar
- Sean McNenney – lead and rhythm guitar
- Jeff Estes – bass
- Louis Panzer – keyboards

=== Additional personnel ===
- Kam Lee – backing vocals

=== Production ===
- Produced by Tom Morris and Nocturnus
- Engineered by Tom Morris; recorded at Morrisound Studio, Florida
- Cover art by Dan Seagrave
- Logo by R.P. Roberts
- All music by Nocturnus
- Lyrics on tracks 1, 2, 3, and 5 by Mike Browning
- Lyrics on tracks 4, 6, 7, and 9 by Mike Browning and Mike Davis
- Lyrics on track 8 by Mike Browning, Mike Davis, and Louis Panzer
