= 2006 Argentine nuclear reactivation plan =

Project to renew development of nuclear power in Argentina

The 2006 Argentine nuclear reactivation plan is a project to renew and reactivate the development of nuclear power in Argentina. The main points of the plan were announced by the Argentine government through Planning Minister Julio de Vido during a press conference on 23 August 2006. They include:

- Finishing the incomplete Atucha II Nuclear Power Plant, which was started on July 14, 1981. Construction was halted in 1994, and resumed in late 2006. Atucha II was scheduled to start up in 2012. The plant began to produce energy on June 27, 2014. It reached its first criticality on June 3, 2014; the first grid connection was on June 25, 2014; the first commercial operation began on May 26, 2016.
- Subsequent to the 2006 plan, Argentina pursued several proposals for a fourth nuclear power plant, including cooperation agreements with China. However, the projects experienced delays and revisions, and construction had not commenced as originally envisioned.
- Extending the operational life of the Embalse power plant, originally projected to end in 2011.
- Resuming the domestic production of enriched uranium. The reactor has a net capacity of 693 MWe and a gross capacity of 745 MWe.
- Construction of the CAREM-25 prototype continued during the 2010s and 2020s. The project experienced multiple delays and cost revisions, but remained one of Argentina's flagship small modular reactor (SMR) initiatives.

In February 2022, Argentina and China signed contracts related to the proposed Atucha III nuclear power plant. The project's future subsequently became uncertain following political and economic changes.
