= Juan Gualterio Roederer =

Juan G. Roederer
- Born: September 2, 1929 (age 96); Trieste, Italy
- Education: University of Buenos Aires, Argentina (Ph.D. in 1952)
- Known for: Solar cosmic rays, Theory of earth’s radiation belts, Neural networks for pitch processing, Foundations of information theory
- Awards: AGU Fellow (1977), AAAS (1980), Edward A. Flinn III Award of the AGU (2000), Recipient of the medal "100 Years of International Geophysics" of the former Soviet Academy of Sciences (awarded to 100 geophysicists worldwide), NASA four Group Achievement Awards, Galileo Mission
- Scientific career
- Fields: Space physics, Psychoacoustics, Information theory
- Workplaces: University of Alaska-Fairbanks

Juan G. Roederer is a professor of physics emeritus at the University of Alaska Fairbanks (UAF). His research fields are space physics, psychoacoustics, science policy and information theory. He conducted pioneering research on solar cosmic rays, on the theory of earth's radiation belts, neural networks for pitch processing, and currently on the foundations of information theory. He is also an accomplished organist.

== Career ==
Roederer was born in Trieste, Italy, on September 2, 1929. He lived as a child in Vienna, Austria, where he went to primary school. In 1939 his family emigrated to Argentina where he completed his education. In high school he met physicist Beatriz Cougnet who would become his wife and research partner.

Roederer earned a Ph.D. in physical-mathematical sciences at University of Buenos Aires, Argentina in 1952 where he studied with Estrella Mazzoli de Mathov. From 1953 to 1955 he worked as guest research scientist at Werner Heisenberg's Max Planck Institute for Physics in Göttingen, Germany. From 1959 to 1966 he was professor of physics at the University of Buenos Aires. In 1967 he moved to the United States where he became professor of physics at the University of Denver, Colorado. In 1977 he was appointed director of the Geophysical Institute at UAF, a post he held until 1986; during that time he also served four years as dean of the College of Environmental Sciences. From 1987 until 2014 he taught and conducted research at the University of Alaska, which conferred him emeritus status in 1993. A visiting staff member of the Los Alamos National Laboratory since 1978, he was chairman of its advisory committee on Earth and Space Sciences from 1983 to 1988. From 1986 to 1992 he served two United States presidents as chairman of the U.S. Arctic Research Commission. Between 1997 and 2003 he was senior adviser to the director of the Abdus Salam International Centre for Theoretical Physics in Trieste, Italy. He now lives in Boulder, Colorado, where one of his activities is writing politically oriented letters to the local newspaper The Daily Camera. He served as member and chairman of several United States Academy of Sciences/National Research Council committees, and was president of the International Association of Geomagnetism and Aeronomy and of the ICSU Committee on Solar Terrestrial Physics

== Publications ==
Roederer is author of 250 articles in scientific journals. He is author and editor of various books

- Roederer, J.G., 2015: Electromagnetismo Elemental, Eudeba, Buenos Aires, 419 pp.
- Roederer, J.G., 1962: Mecanica Elemental, Eudeba, Buenos Aires. Last Edition 2002.
- Roederer, J.G., 1970: Dynamics of Geomagnetically Trapped Radiation. Springer, Berlin, 187 pp. (translated into Russian).
- Roederer, J.G., 1973: Physics and Psychophysics of Music. Springer, New York, 161 pp. (translated into German, Japanese, Spanish and Portuguese). Fourth Edition 2008, 226 pp.
- Roederer, J.G. (ed.), 1983: Progress in Solar-Terrestrial Physics. D. Reidel, Dordrecht, The Netherlands/Boston, USA, 442 pp.
- Malone, T.F., Roederer, J.G. (eds.), 1985: Global Change : The Proceedings of a Symposium. Cambridge University Press, 512 pp.
- Roederer, J.G., 2005: Information and its Role in Nature. Springer, Heidelberg, 250 pp.
- Roederer, J.G., Zhang, H., 2014: Dynamics of Magnetically Trapped Particles. Springer, Heidelberg, 192 pp.

== Awards and honors ==
- Fellow of the American Geophysical Union (1977)
- Fellow of the American Association for the Advancement of Science (1980)
- Senior Research Fellow of the United States National Academy of Sciences (1964–1966)
- Corresponding Member of the National Academy of Science of Argentina (1983)
- Corresponding Member of the National Academy of Science of Austria (1985)
- Associate Fellow of the Academy of Sciences for the Developing World (1990)
- Edward A. Flinn III Award of the American Geophysical Union (2000)
- Honorary Member of the Argentina Physical Association
- Honorary Member of the Argentine Association of Geodesists and Geophysicists
- Recipient of the medal "100 Years of International Geophysics" of the former Soviet Academy of Sciences (awarded to 100 geophysicists worldwide)
- Recipient of four NASA Group Achievement Awards for his collaboration in the Galileo Mission to Jupiter
