= Emma Pérez Ferreira =

Argentine physicist (1925–2005)

- Born: Emma V. Pérez Ferreira; April 2, 1925; Buenos Aires, Argentina
- Died: June 28. 2005; Buenos Aires, Argentina
- Scientific career
- Fields: Physics, Particle Physics
- Institutions: Comisión Nacional de Engergia Atómica

Emma Victoria Pérez Ferreira (2 April 1925 – 28 June 2005) was an Argentine physicist who contributed immensely to the advancement of science in Argentina. She was the first female president of the country's National Atomic Energy Commission (CNEA).

== Life and work ==
Pérez Ferreira was born in Buenos Aires on 2 April 1925 and studied Physico-Mathematical Sciences at the University of Buenos Aires (UBA), earning her bachelor's degree in 1952 and becoming a teacher at the university's Faculty of Exact and Natural Sciences. She received her doctorate in Physics from UBA in 1960 with her dissertation titled, The production of pions by pions at energies of around 1 Bev. She then took postgraduate courses at the University of Durham in England and University of Bologna in Italy, receiving a scholarship from the National Atomic Energy Commission (CNEA). She was one of the first scientists at this institution and held positions of high responsibility, initially dedicating herself to scientific research in high energy nuclear physics. She served as head of the Department of Nuclear Physics for ten years and then Director of research and development.

In 1976, she was appointed head of the project called TANDAR (for TANDem ARgentino), to build a 20 MeV tandem-type accelerator for heavy ions. From 1985 to 1989, she was a member of the Council for the Consolidation of Democracy created by President Raúl Alfonsín. In the period from 1987 to 1989 she was president of the country's National Atomic Energy Commission.

In 1990 she began serving as director of the RETINA (Red Teleinformática Académica or Academic Teleinformatics Network) project, an academic network developed before commercial Internet networks existed, to link computers between universities and facilitate communications among them. When the speed of this network was no longer sufficient, she participated in the implementation of advanced academic networks to integrate Argentina into the newer Internet, which at that time was an advanced North American academic network that allowed large volumes of data to be transferred at higher speeds. In December 2001, Argentina was integrated under a program known as RETINA2.

At the Konex 2003 Science and Technology Awards, Pérez Ferreira received a special mention for her role in Argentine science and technology. At the Constituent Atomic Center of the National Atomic Energy Commission, a public space is named after her: the Emma Pérez Ferreira Auditorium.

She died at the age of 80 in Buenos Aires on 28 June 2005.

== Bibliography ==
- Pérez Ferreira E. & Waloscheck P. J. (1956). Medición de intensidades totales de neutrones rápidos con placas nucleares y su aplicación a la determinación de la distribución angular de los neutrones de la reacción li (d. n).
