= Acheron (band) =

American death/black metal band

- Origin: Pittsburgh, Pennsylvania, U.S.
- Genres: Death metal, black metal
- Years active: 1988–2010, 2010–2016, 2017–2019, 2024 Present
- Labels: Turbo, Lethal, Moribund, Full Moon, Black Lotus, Displeased, Listenable Records
- Members: Vincent Crowley; Art Taylor; Shaun Cothron; Brandon Howe

Acheron (/ˈækərən, -ɒn/) is an American death/black metal band from Pittsburgh, Pennsylvania, formed by Vincent Crowley in 1988. The band is named after the mythological river Acheron (Ancient Greek: Ἀχέρων – Akhérōn) in the underground kingdom of Hades in ancient Greek mythology. They are not to be confused with 1990s Australian death metal band Acheron (which rebranded as Abramelin in the mid-1990s.

== History ==
Founded in 1988 by vocalist/bassist/songwriter Vincent Crowley (formerly of Nocturnus, and leader of the Satanic youth group "Order of the Evil Eye"), Acheron's musical content is almost exclusively Satanic and Anti-Christian. Early albums featured interludes by Peter H. Gilmore. Crowley was appointed as a Church of Satan priest by its founder, Anton Szandor LaVey, and spent a lot of his time debating local televangelists. This limited Acheron's output for a time. He later disassociated himself from the church to act independently.

In 2003, the band released an album of cover songs, Tribute to the Devil's Music, including tracks originally recorded by Black Sabbath, Iron Maiden, Kreator, and Celtic Frost.

On April 26, 2010, Crowley announced the band's breakup. On December 27, 2010, it was announced that Acheron have reunited.

The band broke up again in 2019. Crowley has since focused on underground projects.

== Members ==
- Vincent Crowley – Guitars (1988–1991, 1996–1998, 2008), Vocals (1991–1994, 1994–2010, 2010–2019), Bass (1991–1994, 1994–2010, 2010–2019, 2025-)
- Art Taylor – Guitars (2009–2010, 2012–2019)
- Eric Stewart – Guitars (2024-)
- Cody Johns – Drums (2017–2018, 2025-)

=== Vocals ===
- Michael Smith – Vocals (1988–1990)
- Rhiannon Wisniewski – Vocals (2002)

=== Guitars ===
- Belial Koblak – Guitars (1989–1991)
- Pete Slate – Guitars (1991–1992)
- Tony Blakk – Guitars (1992, 1994, 1995)
- Vincent Breeding – Guitars (1992, 1994–1995)
- Trebor Ladres – Guitars (1994–1995)
- Michael Estes – Guitars (1996–1999, 2001–2004)
- Bryan Hipp – Guitars (1998; died 2006)
- Ben Meyer – Guitars (1998)
- Bill Taylor – Guitars (1999)
- Stacey Connolly – Guitars (2004)
- Max Otworth – Guitars (2006–2010, 2010–2012)
- Ash Thomas – Guitars (2008–2009)
- Eric Stewart – Guitars (2010)

=== Bass ===
- David Smith – Bass (1988–1991)
- Troy Heffern – Bass (1996)

=== Keyboards ===
- Peter H. Gilmore – Keyboards (1988–1989)
- John Scott – Keyboards (1996–1999)
- Adina Blase – Keyboards (1998–1999)
- Aaron Werner – Keyboards (2001–2005)

=== Drums ===
- James Strauss – Drums (1988–1989, 1989–1991, 1991–1992)
- Ron Hogue – Drums (1989)
- Robert Orr – Drums (1991)
- Michael Browning – Drums (1992, 1994–1995; died 2026)
- Joe Oliver – Drums (1995)
- Richard Christy – Drums (1996–1998)
- Tony Laureano – Drums (1998)
- Jonathan Lee – Drums (1998–1999)
- Daniel Zink – Drums (2001)
- Kyle Severn – Drums (2002–2010, 2010–2014)
- Scott Pletcher – Drums (2010)

== Discography ==
- Messe Noir (Demo, 1989)
- Rites of the Black Mass (1991, re-released in 2006)
- Alla Xul (7", Demo, 1992)
- Rites of the Black Mass (Turbo, 1992)
- Hail Victory (CD, Metal Merchant, 1993)
- Satanic Victory (CD, Turbo, 1994)
- Lex Talionis (CD, Turbo, 1994; reissued as Lex Talionis: Satanic Victory, Blackened, 1997)
- Anti-God, Anti-Christ (CD, Moribund, 1996)
- Those Who Have Risen (CD, Full Moon Productions, 1998)
- Compendium Diablerie: The Demo Days (CD, Full Moon Productions, 2001)
- Xomaly (2002)
- Rebirth: Metamorphosing Into Godhood (CD, Black Lotus, 2003)
- Tribute to the Devil's Music (CD, Black Lotus, 2003)
- The Final Conflict: Last Days of God (CD, Displeased Records, 2009)
- Kult Des Hasses (CD, Listenable Records, 2014)
- Aveum Luciferi (CD, Hells Headbangers, 2026)
