= Brutality (band) =

American death metal band

- Also known as: Abomination, Darkness
- Origin: Tampa, Florida
- Genre: Death metal
- Years active: 1986–1997; 2002–2004; 2008; 2012–2020; 2021–present
- Labels: Metal Mind; Nuclear Blast; Ceremonial Records
- Members: Jeff Acres; Scott Riegel; Jay Fernandez; Ruston Grosse
- Past members: Bryan Hipp; Dana Walsh; Pete Sykes; Larry Sapp; Donnie Yanson; Kenny Karg; Bill Benson; Tim Mitchell; Don Gates; Jim Coker; Angelo Duca; Demian Heftel
- Website: brutalitytheband.com

Brutality is an American death metal band from Tampa, Florida. The group signed to Nuclear Blast Records in the 1990s.

== History ==
The group formed in 1986 as Abomination and released their first, self-titled demo. In 1988, they changed their name to Brutality and released their second demo, also called Brutality. The band's third demo, Dimension Demented, was recorded in 1990 and three songs from it were later released on a 7-inch named "Hell On Earth" with Gore Records. Metamorphosis, the band's fourth demo, followed in 1991 on Wild Rags Records. In 1992, the lineup consisted of Scott Riegel on vocals, Jay Fernandez on guitar, Don Gates on guitar, Jeff Acres on bass and vocals, and Jim Coker on drums. Soon after, they signed with Nuclear Blast Records. After releasing the 7-inch EP "Sadistic" in 1992, they recorded their debut album, Screams of Anguish, in 1993, and went on a European tour with Hypocrisy in the beginning of 1994. Their second full-length album, When the Sky Turns Black, was released in the US in December 1994 and in Europe in January 1995. A second European tour followed in 1995, supporting Bolt Thrower. Guitarist Bryan Hipp had joined the band for When the Sky Turns Black, and guitarists Dana Walsh and Pete Sykes joined the band in time for the release of their third album, In Mourning, in 1996. The band split up in 1997.

In 2008, all three albums were remastered and released on Polish label Metal Mind Productions. In 2011, they released a boxset containing three CDs with rare material, as well as their demo tapes from 1986 to 1992. The boxset contains a poster and a live DVD. The band reformed in 2012 with the complete line-up of Screams of Anguish, and in 2013, released an EP containing two new songs entitled "Ruins of Humans". The band released their fourth album, Sea of Ignorance, in January 2016 on Ceremonial Records. The album got a European release on Mighty Music in 2017. The band performed at Maryland Deathfest in 2019, and began working on material for their next album. The band briefly broke up in 2020, but reformed in 2021 and announced the release of Sempieternity, a compilation containing new songs, re-recordings, and live material.

== Discography ==
- Abomination (demo, 1987)
- Brutality (demo, 1988)
- Dimension Demented (demo, 1990)
- Metamorphosis (demo, 1991)
- Brutality 1992 (demo, 1992)
- Screams of Anguish (Nuclear Blast Records, 1993)
- When the Sky Turns Black (Nuclear Blast, 1994)
- In Mourning (Nuclear Blast, 1996)
- Demo 2003 (demo, 2003)
- The Demos (Boxset, 2011)
- Ruins of Humans (EP, 2013)
- Orchestrated Devastation The Best Of (Compilation 2014)
- Sea of Ignorance (Ceremonial Records, 2016)
- The Complete demos 1987-1991 (Compilation-V.I.C. records 2021)
- Sempiternity (Compilation-Emanzipation Productions 2022)

== Members ==
=== Present ===
- Jeff Acres – vocals, bass (1987-1996, 2001–2005, 2012-present)
- Scott Riegel – vocals (1992-1996, 2001–2005, 2012-present)
- Jay Fernandez – guitars (1991-1993, 2012–present)
- Ronnie Parmer - drums (2017–present)
- Jarrett Pritchard - guitars (2019–present)

=== Past ===
- Bryan Hipp – guitar (1993–1995)
- Dana Walsh – guitar (1995–1997)
- Pete Sykes – guitar (1996–1997)
- Larry Sapp – guitar, vocals (1986–1991)
- Donnie Yanson – drums (1986–1987)
- Kenny "Foz" Karg – drums (1987–1988)
- Bill Benson – guitar (1987)
- Tim Mitchell – guitar (1988)
- Don Gates - guitar (1988-1994, 2001–2005, 2012–2014)
- Jim Coker - drums (1988-1996, 2001–2005, 2012–2014)
- Angelo Duca - drums (ca. 2008)
- Demian Heftel - guitar (ca. 2008)
- Earl "Maddog" Zambozilla - drums (2012)
- Duane Timlin - drums (2014)
- Alex Marquez - drums (2015)
- Ruston Grosse - drums (2015-2016)
- Jason Schwartzwalder - guitar (2017-2019)
