= Atucha Nuclear Power Plant =

Nuclear generating complex in Argentina

Atucha I nuclear power plant
- Official name: Central Nuclear Juan Domingo Perón
- Country: Argentina
- Location: Lima, Buenos Aires
- Coordinates: 33°58′02″S 59°12′27″W
- Status: Operational
- Construction began: 1968
- Commission date: 1974
- Construction cost: $1.3 Billion
- Operator: Nucleoelectrica Argentina

Nuclear power station
- Reactor type: PHWR KWU
- Reactor supplier: Siemens
- Thermal capacity: 1,179 MW_{th}

Power generation
- Make and model: Siemens
- Nameplate capacity: 362 MW
- Annual net output: 2,397 GW·h

External links
- Website: central nuclear atucha I
- Commons: Related media on Commons

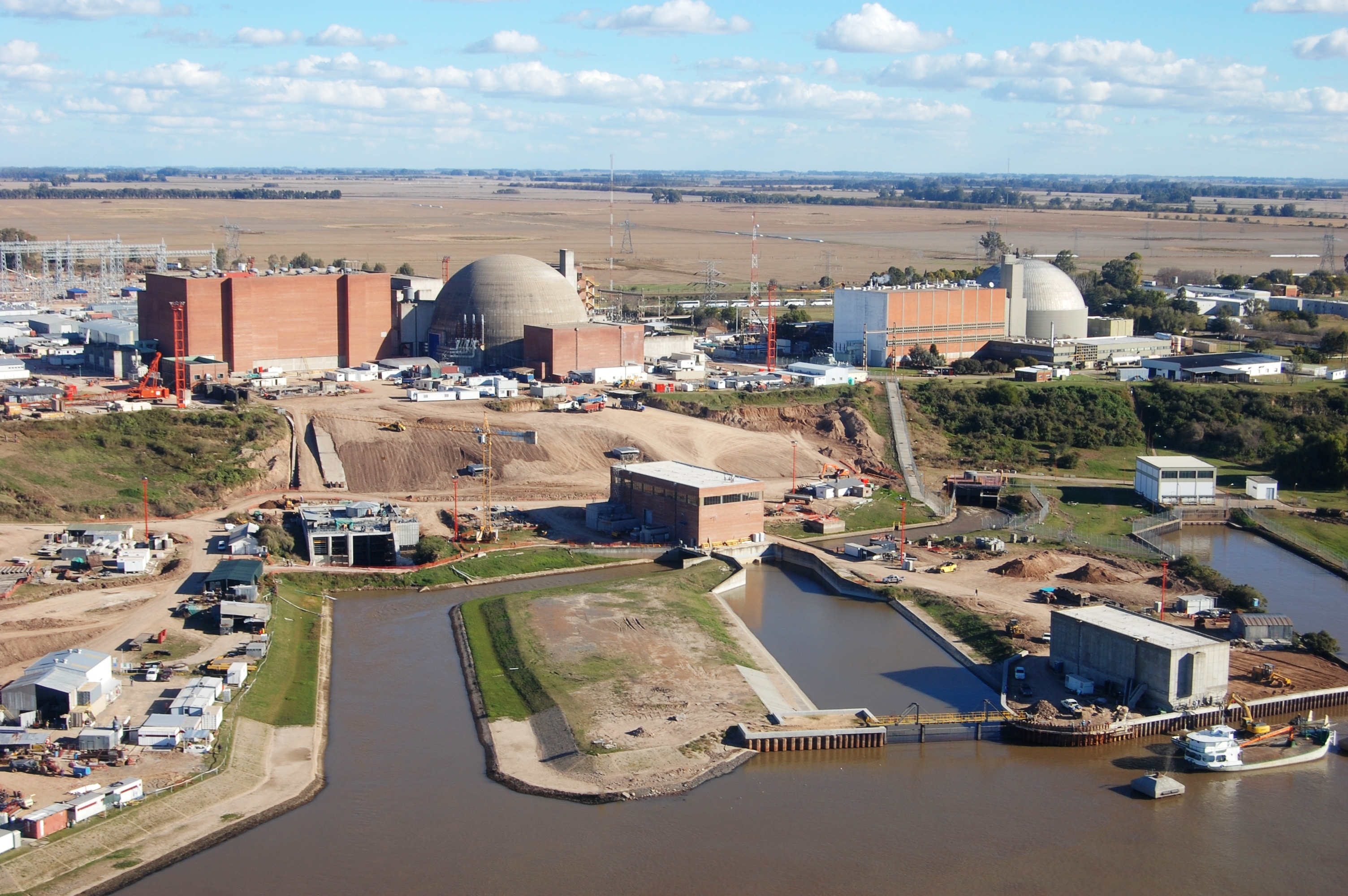
Atucha Nuclear Power Plant was the first nuclear power plant in Latin America.

Atucha II Nuclear Power Plant
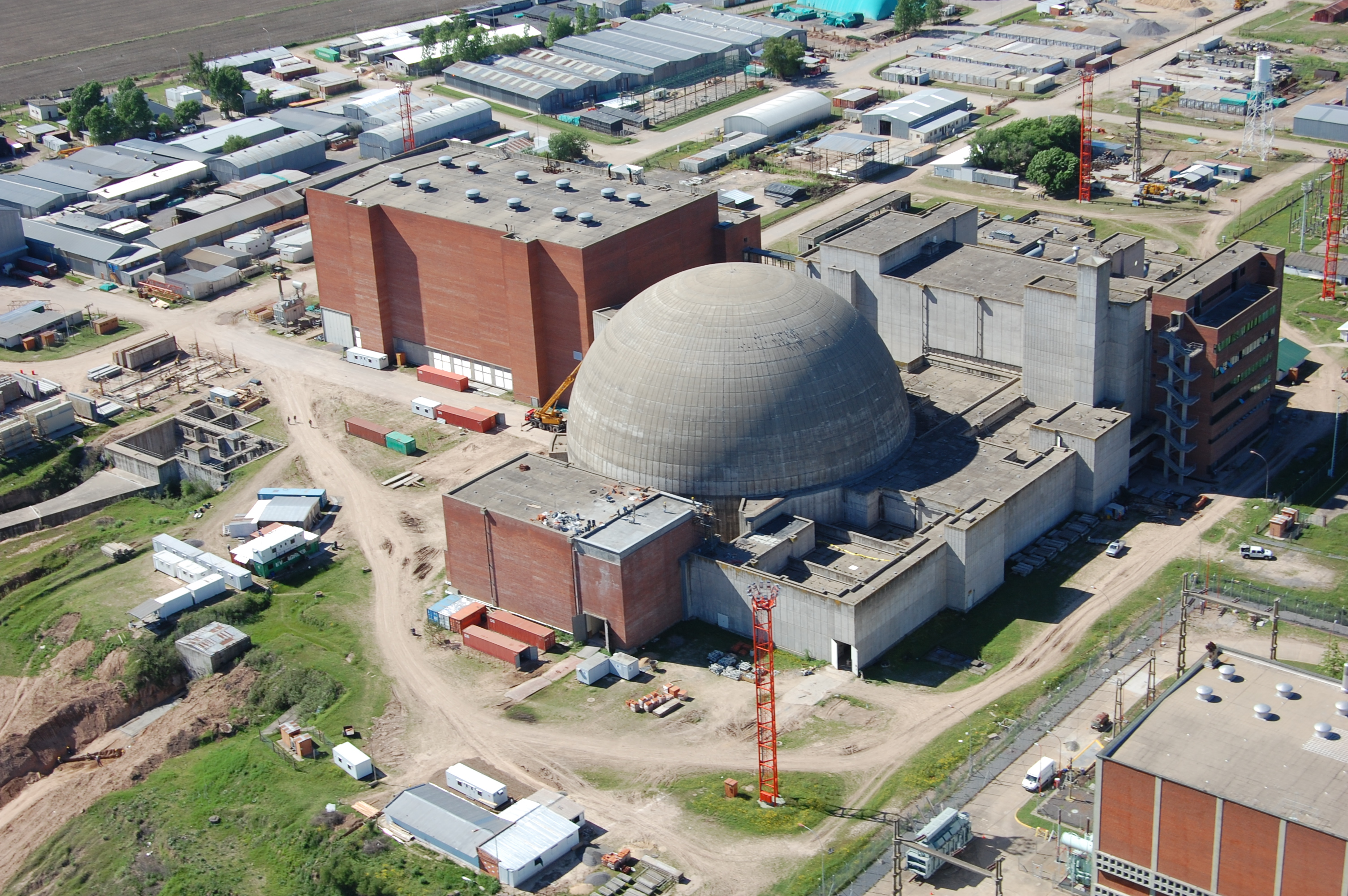
- The plant still under construction (2012).
- Official name: Central Nuclear Néstor Kirchner
- Country: Argentina
- Location: Lima, Buenos Aires
- Status: Operational
- Construction began: 1981; 2007 (resumed construction)
- Commission date: 2014
- Operator: Nucleoelectrica Argentina

Nuclear power station
- Reactor type: PHWR KWU
- Reactor supplier: Siemens
- Thermal capacity: 2,175 MW_{th}

Power generation
- Make and model: Siemens
- Nameplate capacity: 745 MW
- Annual net output: 5,201 GW·h (2016)

External links
- Website: central nuclear atucha II
- Commons: Related media on Commons

The Atucha Nuclear Complex, or Atucha Nuclear Power Plant, is the location for two adjacent nuclear power plants in Lima, Zárate, Buenos Aires Province, about 100 kilometres (60 mi) from Buenos Aires, on the right-hand shore of the Paraná de las Palmas River. Both are pressurized heavy-water reactors (PHWR) of the German PHWR KWU design, employing a mixture of natural uranium and enriched uranium (0.85% of ^{235}U), and use heavy water for cooling and neutron moderation.

The other currently operating nuclear power plant in the country Embalse Nuclear Power Plant is also a natural uranium fueled PHWR but of the Canadian CANDU 6 type rather than the Siemens provided type used at Atucha.

The PHWR KWU design is unique in the world: It uses a reactor pressure vessel similar to that of a PWR reactor, with fuel elements inserted from the vessel lid, that support online refueling. The fuel elements and reactor vessel are in a vertical orientation, similarly to a PWR reactor. Due to online refueling, the fuel elements are accessible for online refueling from the floor of a reactor hall and disassembly of the reactor is not straightforward like in a PWR as this is not a routine operation. The top of the reactor must be kept clear for the online refueling machine, so the control rods are inserted diagonally from the top of the reactor vessel lid near the outer circumference of the lid, and sit diagonally in the reactor core. The control rods do not converge at the center as they are also tilted in yaw and not just pitch. The reactors have separate moderation liquid, and cooling liquid circuits. The Cooling circuit connects to the sides of the vessel as in a conventional PWR, and the moderation circuit connects at the top and sides of the vessel. The Cooling water flows within the fuel channels, and there is moderation water surrounding the channels, like a CANDU reactor. There is filler material at both domes of the vessel, to reduce the amount of moderator required. The moderator and cooling water are kept at different temperatures. It is a larger version of the MZFR reactor in Germany. Argentina owns the entire fuel cycle for the reactors including fuel assembly.

== Atucha I ==
Atucha I was started in 1968 and began operation in 1974; it was the first nuclear power plant in Latin America. On 25 March 1973, before its completion, the plant was temporarily captured by the People's Revolutionary Army who stole a FMK-3 submachine gun and three .45 caliber handguns. When they retired they had a confrontation with the police, injuring two police officers.

It has a thermal power of 1,179 MW_{th}, and generates 362 MW_{e} of electricity, which is delivered at 220 kilovolts to the Argentine Interconnection System, supplying about 2.5% of the total electricity production (2005).

== Atucha II ==
Atucha II is a natural uranium fueled reactor, which construction started in July 1981 under a contract with Siemens, but was halted in 1994. It was planned to have a much higher power (thermal power approx. 2,000 MW, electrical 750 MW) than Atucha I. At the time when it was started, it had the largest reactor pressure vessel of any nuclear power plant worldwide. The total cost as of 2006 was estimated at US$3.8 billion, or about $5500/kWe. Atucha II like Atucha I before it is one of only a handful of heavy water reactors of a type other than the CANDU-type or the related IPHWR-type ever built. Prior to the EPR it was the last nuclear power plant built by Siemens.

Partly as a response to the energy shortage caused by natural gas crisis of 2004, the issue of Atucha II was taken up by the Argentine government. In 2005 President Néstor Kirchner signed a decree to reactivate the construction and pledged to finish it by 2009. New technicians were hired and a budget of about $120 million was requested for 2006. Eduardo Messi, president of Nucleoeléctrica Argentina S.A. (the firm in charge of the plant), told reporters that 93% of the components were either in storage or already installed.

On 23 August 2006 the government announced the re-activation of the national nuclear programme, and updated its promise to finish Atucha II by 2010, devoting a total of 1,850 million pesos ($596/€466 million). The plant was slated to come online with an installed capacity of about 745 MW (3% of Argentina's total electric installed capacity).

Atucha II was "pre-started" on 28 September 2011 by President Cristina Fernández de Kirchner and it was scheduled to start commercial service by mid-2013.

On 3 June 2014 reached its first criticality, and on 27 June 2014 began to produce energy.

On 19 February 2015, the plant reached 100% power production for the first time, increasing the percentage of nuclear power in Argentina's energy mix from 7% to 10%.

== Atucha III ==
In February 2022, Argentina and the China National Nuclear Corporation agreed on an engineering, procurement, and construction contract for a Hualong One nuclear power plant with a gross generation capacity of 1200 MWe, at a cost of about US$8 billion. Unlike the other two blocks the Hualong One is a light water reactor - which would make it the first such reactor in the country - and thus needs a higher enriched fuel, requiring Argentina either to build up uranium enrichment facilities or to import fuel for this reactor. The Hualong One is also not capable of online refueling but it is a much more powerful design than the other two blocks at Atucha and will have a higher nameplate capacity than the other two reactors combined.

== See also ==
- Nuclear energy in Argentina
- National Atomic Energy Commission
- Embalse nuclear power plant
- List of nuclear reactors
