= Embalse Nuclear Power Station =

Nuclear power plant in Argentina

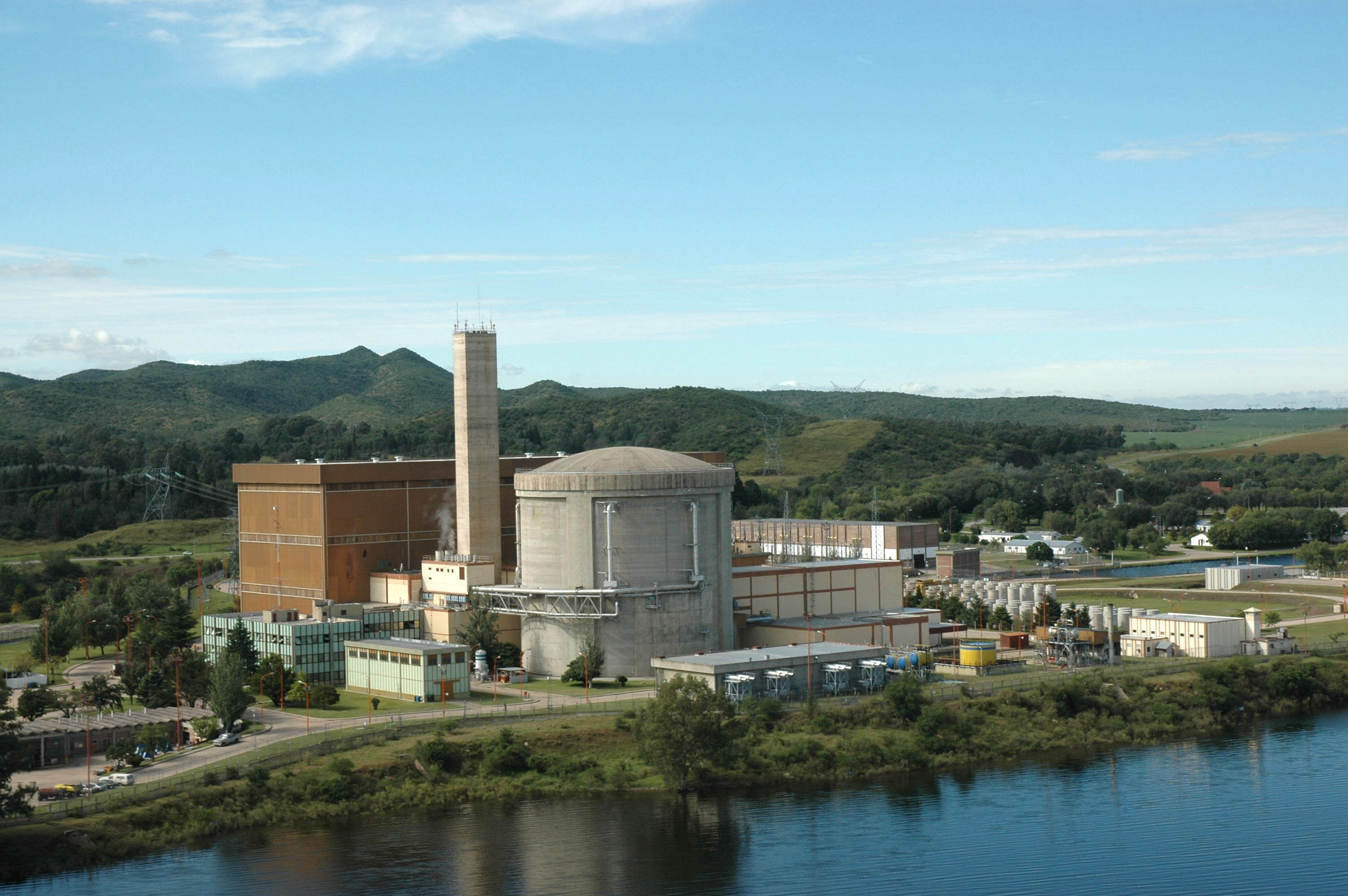
- Official name: Central Nuclear Embalse
- Country: Argentina
- Coordinates: 32.232°S 64.443°W
- Status: Operational
- Construction began: 1974
- Commission date: 20 January 1984
- Operator: Nucleoeléctrica Argentina Sociedad Anónima

Nuclear power station
- Reactors: 1
- Reactor type: CANDU
- Reactor supplier: Atomic Energy of Canada Limited
- Thermal capacity: 2,015 MWt

Power generation
- Units operational: 1 × 683 MW (gross)
- Nameplate capacity: 635 MW
- Annual net output: 5,192 GW·h (2009)

External links
- Website: central nuclear embalse
- Commons: Related media on Commons

The Embalse Nuclear Power Station (Spanish: Central Nuclear Embalse) is one of three operational nuclear power plants in Argentina. It is located on the southern shore of a reservoir on the Río Tercero, near the city of Embalse, Córdoba, 110 km south-southwest of Córdoba City.

The plant is a CANDU Pressurised Heavy Water Reactor (PHWR). It employs natural uranium (that is, with 0.72% of ^{235}U) and uses heavy water for cooling and neutron moderation. It has a thermal power of 2,109 MW_{th}, and generates 648 MW_{e} of electricity, with a net output of about 600 MW_{e}, supplying nearly 4.5% of the production of the Argentine Interconnection System (2005).

Additionally, Embalse produces the cobalt-60 radioisotope, which is employed in medicine (cancer therapy) and industrial applications. Argentina is one of the largest producers and exporters of this isotope in the world, along with Canada and Russia.

Embalse was started in 1974 and began operation in 1983 (first criticality 13 March 1983, declared commercial 20 January 1984). It was built by an Italian-Canadian consortium formed by AECL, acting as the "turn-key" supplier of the nuclear portion, and Italimpianti, the "turn-key" supplier of the conventional portion.

On 31 December 2015, the plant was taken offline, having completed its first operating cycle of about 30 years.

On 1 September 2016, the plant received the last two of four steam generators, fundamental elements for the life extension of the plant. The plant was reconditioned to deliver power for another 30 years: the replacement of the four steam generators was one of the key steps. The plant was restarted on 4 January 2019, with power upgraded to a gross capacity of 683 MW and 635 MW net.

== See also ==
- National Atomic Energy Commission
- Atucha I Nuclear Power Plant
- Atucha II Nuclear Power Plant
