= Pilcaniyeu =

Coordinates: 41°08′S 70°40′W

- Municipality and village
- Interactive map of Pilcaniyeu
- Country: Argentina
- Province: Río Negro Province
- Time zone: UTC−3 (ART)
- Climate: Csb

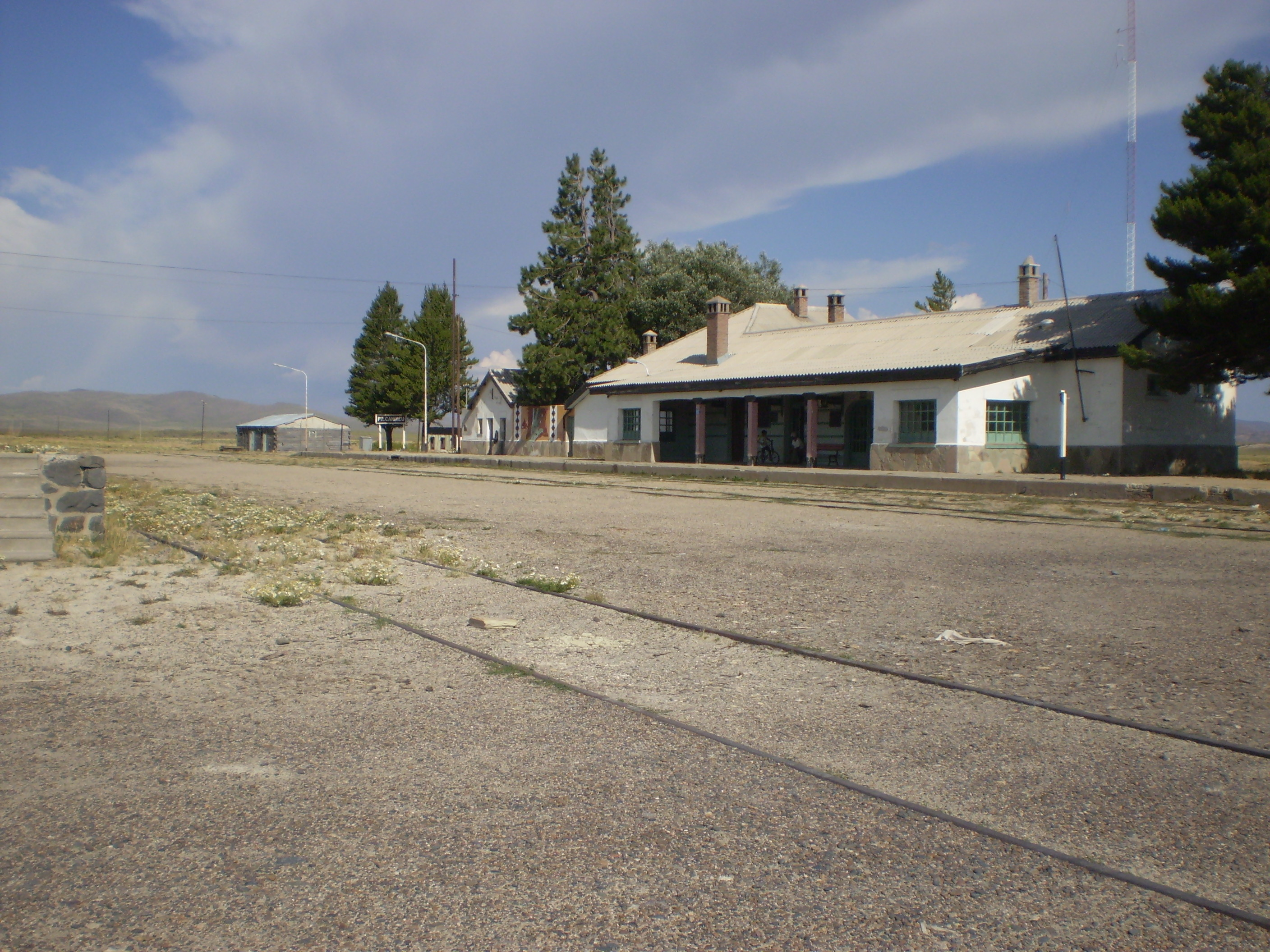
Pilcaniyeu

Pilcaniyeu is a village and municipality in Río Negro Province in Argentina. It is located 65 km from the city of Bariloche.

On November 30, 2015, President Cristina Fernández de Kirchner led the ceremony for the opening of a uranium-enrichment plant in the village.

== Geography ==
=== Climate ===
The climate is arid, cold and windy, with comparatively wetter winters.

Climate data for INTA Pilcaniyeu
Month	Jan	Feb	Mar	Apr	May	Jun	Jul	Aug	Sep	Oct	Nov	Dec	Year
Record high °C (°F)	35.0 (95.0)	36.0 (96.8)	30.0 (86.0)	25.3 (77.5)	20.0 (68.0)	18.0 (64.4)	16.0 (60.8)	19.0 (66.2)	21.0 (69.8)	27.1 (80.8)	33.0 (91.4)	31.0 (87.8)	36.0 (96.8)
Mean daily maximum °C (°F)	21.1 (70.0)	20.8 (69.4)	17.7 (63.9)	11.7 (53.1)	7.5 (45.5)	6.0 (42.8)	5.3 (41.5)	6.8 (44.2)	9.4 (48.9)	12.7 (54.9)	16.1 (61.0)	18.5 (65.3)	12.8 (55.0)
Daily mean °C (°F)	14.2 (57.6)	14.2 (57.6)	11.9 (53.4)	7.1 (44.8)	3.9 (39.0)	1.4 (34.5)	0.9 (33.6)	2.6 (36.7)	4.7 (40.5)	7.9 (46.2)	10.7 (51.3)	12.4 (54.3)	7.7 (45.9)
Mean daily minimum °C (°F)	7.0 (44.6)	7.0 (44.6)	6.4 (43.5)	2.2 (36.0)	0.0 (32.0)	−3.2 (26.2)	−4.3 (24.3)	−1.7 (28.9)	0.3 (32.5)	2.7 (36.9)	5.5 (41.9)	5.9 (42.6)	2.3 (36.1)
Record low °C (°F)	−2.0 (28.4)	−2.0 (28.4)	−8.0 (17.6)	−10.0 (14.0)	−17.0 (1.4)	−20.0 (−4.0)	−28.0 (−18.4)	−20.0 (−4.0)	−12.4 (9.7)	−15.0 (5.0)	−11.0 (12.2)	−4.0 (24.8)	−28.0 (−18.4)
Average precipitation mm (inches)	4.8 (0.19)	13.8 (0.54)	17.1 (0.67)	19.6 (0.77)	38.9 (1.53)	53.1 (2.09)	38.3 (1.51)	26.7 (1.05)	19.0 (0.75)	19.0 (0.75)	11.0 (0.43)	7.2 (0.28)	268.5 (10.57)
Average rainy days	1.2	1.8	1.9	3.7	5.9	6.2	5.7	4.3	3.1	3.3	1.7	1.1	39.9
Average snowy days	0.0	0.0	0.0	0.0	1.0	2.3	1.0	1.3	1.3	1.0	0.0	0.0	7.9
Source: Instituto Nacional de Tecnología Agropecuaria

== Gallery ==
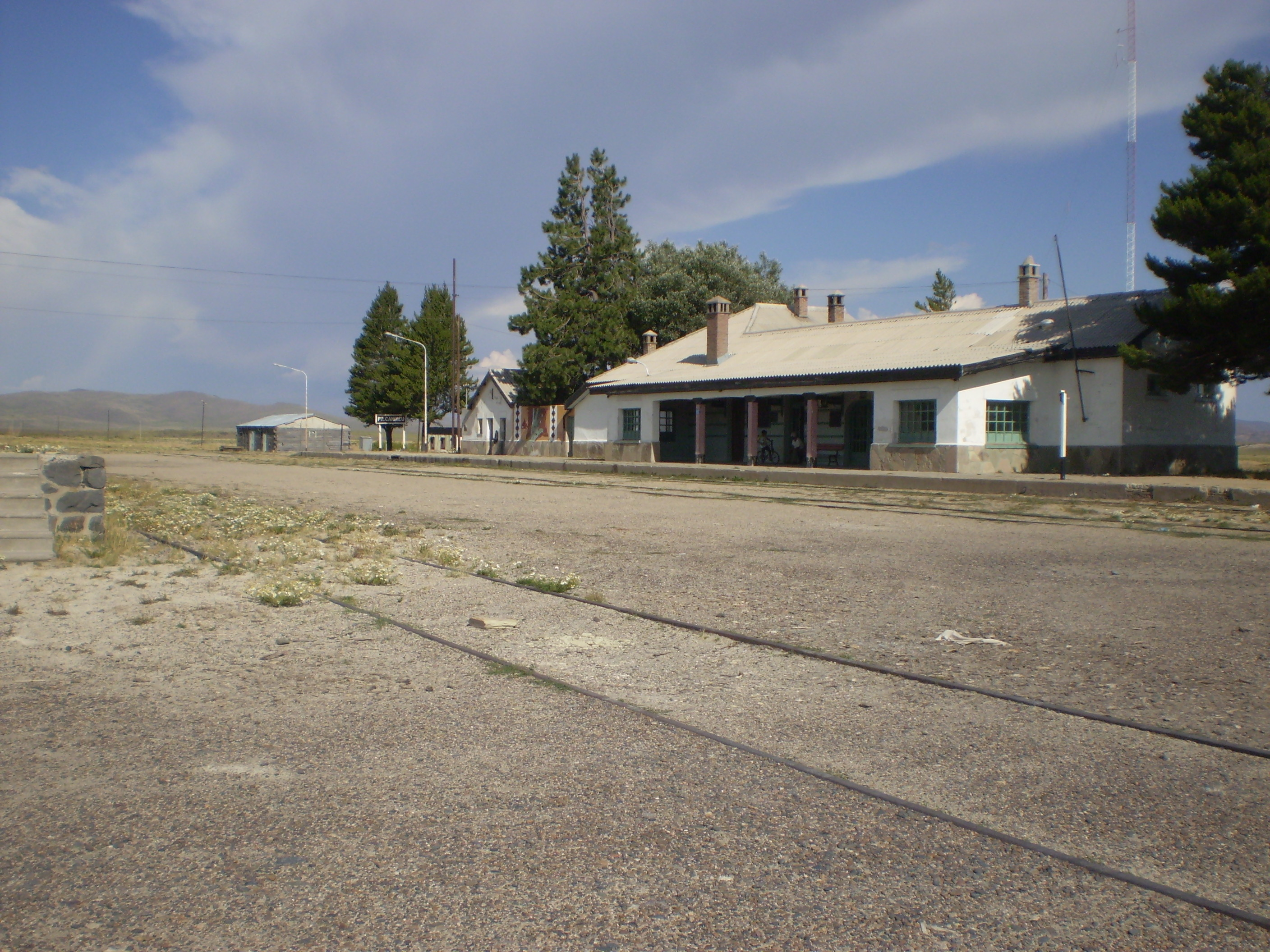
Train station

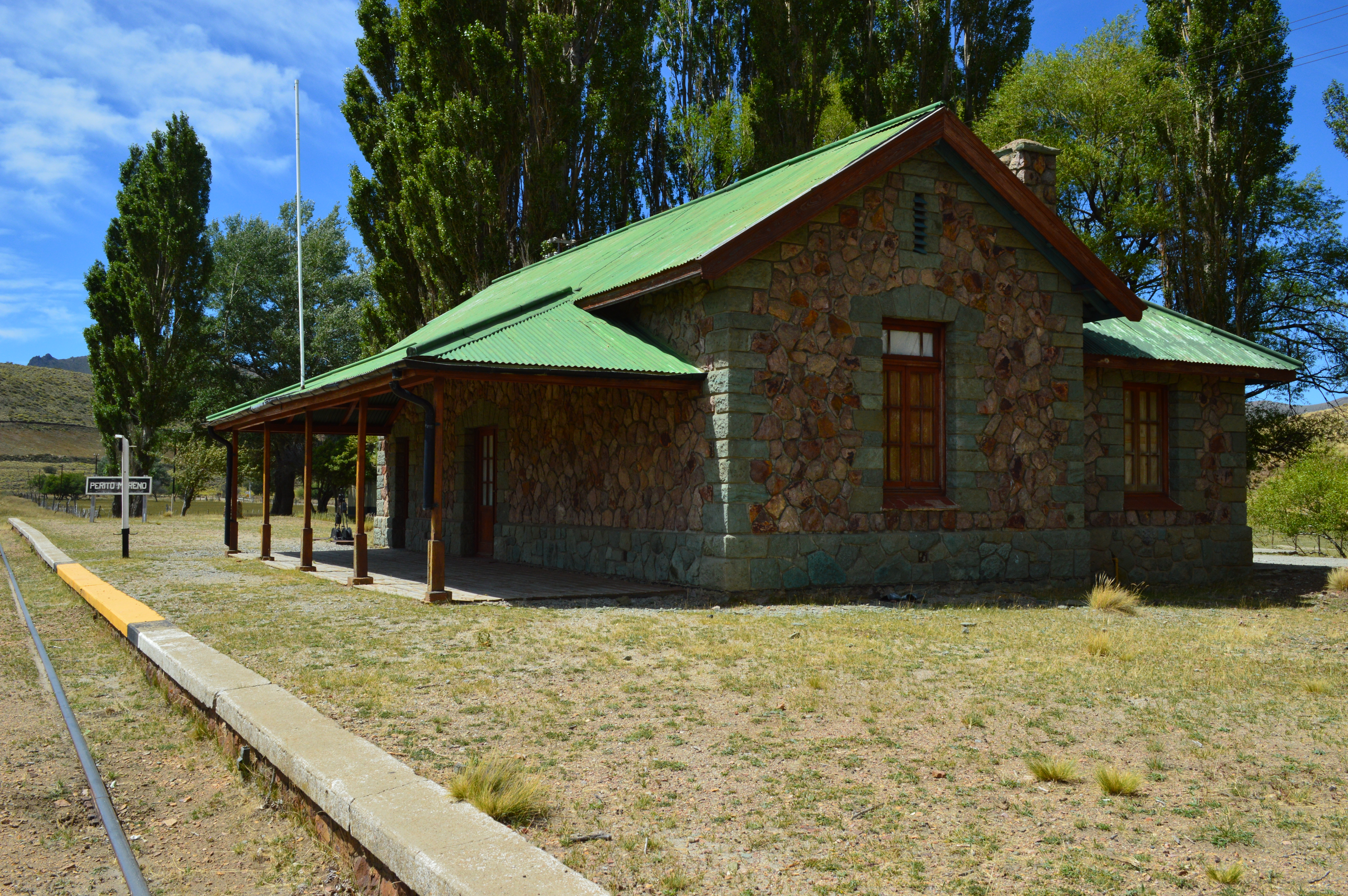
Perito Moreno station

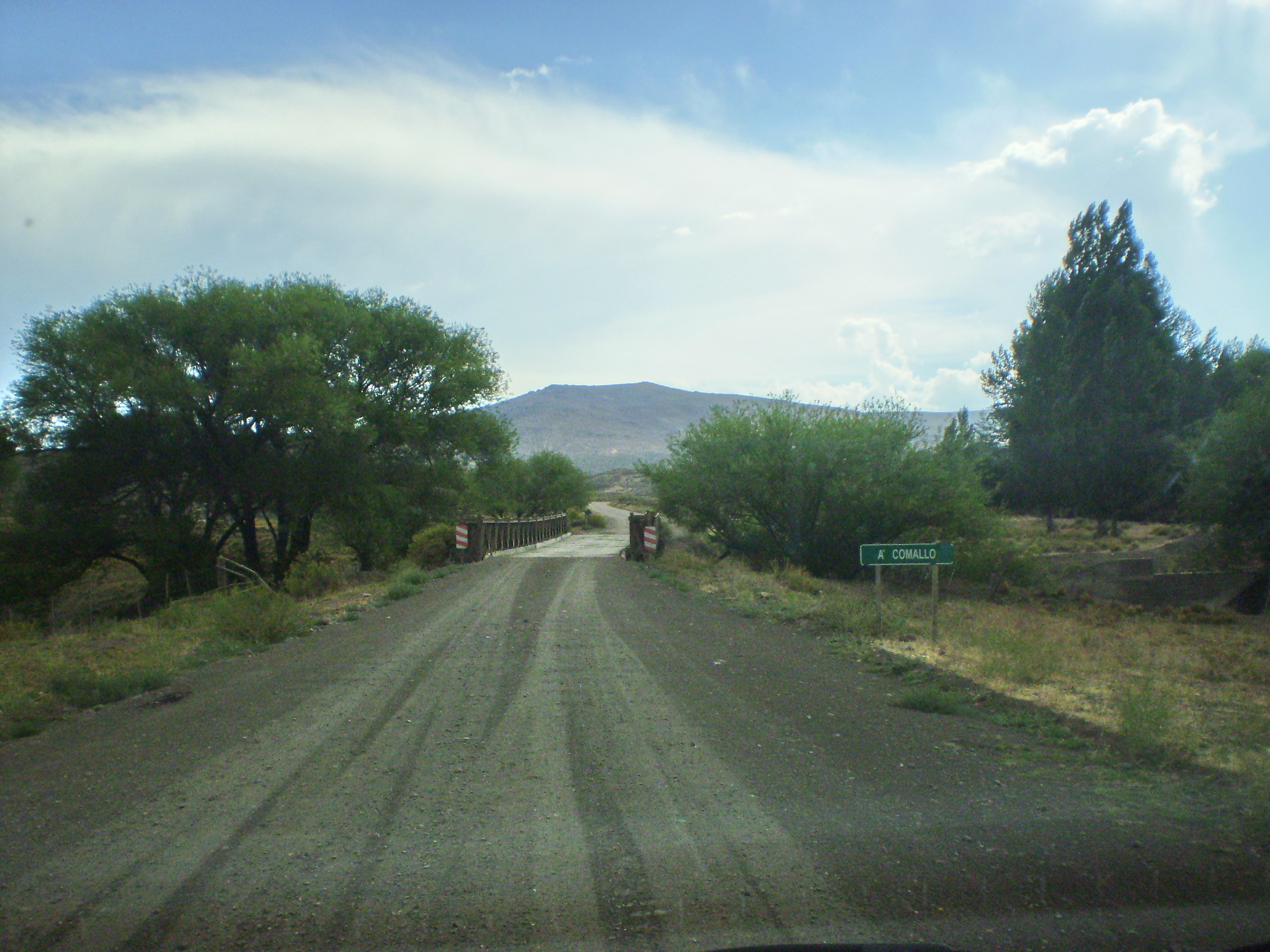
Bridge over Cormallo stream
