= RA-1 Enrico Fermi =

Research nuclear reactor in Argentina

RA-1 Enrico Fermi is a research reactor at Centro Atómico Constituyentes in Argentina. It was the first nuclear reactor to be built in that country and the first research reactor in the southern hemisphere.

Construction started in April 1957, with first criticality on 20 January 1958. By contrast, the HIFAR reactor in Australia went critical just six days later, on 26 January 1958. The RA-1 reactor produced the first medical and industrial radioisotopes made in Argentina, and was used to train staff for the first two nuclear power stations there.

It is a pool type, with enriched uranium oxide fuel (20% U-235), light water coolant and moderator, and a graphite reflector. It produces 40 kilowatts of thermal energy at full authorized power.

It has been modernized on several occasions, and is currently used for research and teaching.
