= Lima, Argentina =

Lima
- Town
- Location in Buenos Aires Province
- Coordinates: 34°02′S 59°12′W
- Country: Argentina
- Province: Buenos Aires
- Partido: Zárate
- Elevation: 25 m (82 ft)

Population (2001 census [INDEC])
  - Total: 8,375
- CPA Base: B 2806

Lima is a town in Zárate Partido, Buenos Aires Province, Argentina, with a population of 8,375 (2001 census [INDEC]).
