= 2020 Córdoba wildfires =

Wildfires Córdoba 2020

2020 Córdoba Wildfires
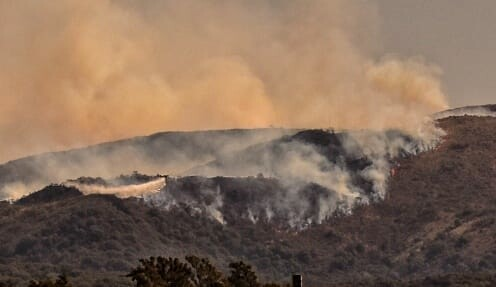

Statistics
- Total fires: 51
- Total area: 60,000 hectares (150,000 acres)

Impacts
- Deaths: 2

The 2020 Córdoba wildfires are a series of wildfires burning through the Córdoba Province in Argentina.

Over 60,000 hectares (150,000 acres) are estimated to have been affected by the fires. Fifty-one fires had been registered as of October 2020. Residents of several towns had to be evacuated. At least two persons died as a consequence of the fires.

Provincial Justice started an investigation on the wildfires, suspecting they were started intentionally in some areas.

Argentina was affected by several wildfires in 2020, during a pronounced drought, such as the 2020 Delta del Paraná wildfires.

== Background ==
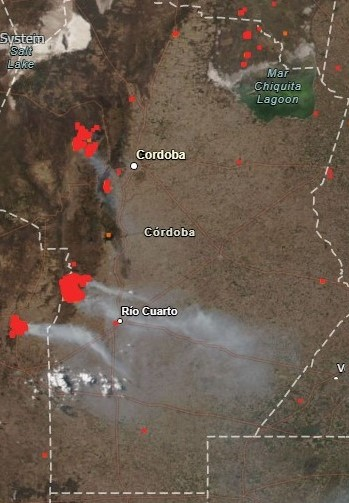
FIRMS Satellite imagery of the wildfires (September 2020)

The center Argentine region, primarily the Córdoba Province, has a temperate climate with a low-humidity winter. Rainfall season is limited to the spring and summer, while winters usually lack rains. This has been changing to a more humid climate, according to some opinions, due to climate change.

During August 2020, the center region of Argentina experienced a drought, aggravated by an increase in winds, which favored the spread of wildfires. Particularly, the Sierras de Córdoba Mountains Range went by over 100 days without rains, with temperatures reaching 39 °C (102 °F). The El Niño–Southern Oscillation phenomenon was, by September 2020, in a neutral phase, with an increase of a La Niña phenomenon likelihood.

The Córdoba vegetation cover is composed of "native mount" species—trees such as Prosopis (Spanish: algarrobos), pepper trees (molles), desert hackberries (talas), espinillos, and quebrachos—thorny shrubs, and in mountain areas grasslands with dry grasses. This vegetation is a big combustion risk during the dry season.

Winter months usually harbor the most wildfires, with August being the month with the largest number of fires. In the 1999–2017 period, 5,528 fires stroke the Córdoba Mountains, affecting 700,385 hectares (1,730,690 acres). In the 21st century, the largest number of fires was registered in 2003, with 364 fires, and the biggest affected areas being recorded in 2013, with 106,206 hectares (262,440 acres).

95% of wildfires in Argentina are a consequence of human action, some intentional and others caused by neglect or carelessness after bonfires, the dropping of cigarette butts, or the burning of trash getting out of control. Some intentional fires are believed to have been started by ranchers to clean pastures for further agricultural or husbandry usage of lands, and others for real state use, such as the construction of gated communities.

== Area Affected ==
Area	Towns Affected or Threatened
Valle de Punilla	Quebrada de Luna; Charbonier; Capilla del Monte; La Falda; Valle Hermoso; Cosquín; Santa María de Punilla; Bialet Massé; San Roque
Sierras Chicas	La Calera; Saldán
Ischilín Department	Ongamira; Copacabana; Cañada de Río Pinto; Villa Albertina; Villa Cerro Negro
Río Cuarto Department	Achiras

== Firefighting ==
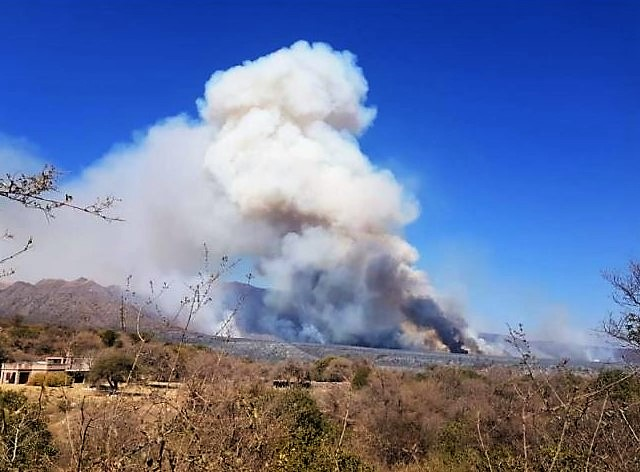
Fires in Cerro Negro

Park rangers volunteered to help fight the fires. As of 1 October, seven planes were being used (6 hydrant and 1 for support), and 200 brigadiers were deployed to fight the fires.

Authorities had to insist on advising residents to not try to control the fires themselves, as they sometimes blocked roads while trying to do so, disturbing the firemen's work. Some volunteer firefighters claimed neighbors should be trained to help fight the fires.

== Effects ==
The environmental damage of the fires was deemed "unmeasurable", citing a biodiversity loss as well as a lowered catchment capacity of soils. As the fires extend, an increased likelihood of future fires is expected in areas burnt in 2020. Wildlife was also affected.

As the Córdoba Mountains' vegetation is of slow growth, between 5 and 20 centimetres a year, about 30 years are expected to be needed for the forests to recover.

Up to a 48% decrease in water capture is expected to hit the basins surrounding the burnt areas. Mountain creeks are used for human water consumption, and are already affected by droughts. They could drag ashes and burnt material, affecting drinkable water quality.

An agricultural state of emergency was declared in the affected areas, and relief packages were established.

== See also ==
- 2020s in environmental history
- 2020 Delta del Paraná wildfires
