= Carbon capture and storage in Argentina =

Carbon capture and storage in Argentina refers to research and pilot-scale assessments on the potential to capture carbon dioxide (CO₂) emissions from industrial and power-generation sources and permanently store them underground. As of 2025, there are no commercial carbon capture and storage (CCS) facilities operating in Argentina, but national plans, academic publications, and industrial proposals for identify CCS as a potential tool to support the decarbonization of heavy industry and electricity generation, and to enable low-carbon hydrogen (blue hydrogen) as a CO₂ utilization pathway.

== National emissions profile ==
Although Argentina is not among the world's highest total emitters, several recent studies identify it as one of the highest emitters per capita in the region. The main sectors contributing to greenhouse gas emissions are transport, electricity, and industry (specifically cement and chemicals). According to the country's first Biennial Transparency Report (IBT1), Argentina emitted approximately 216–220 MtCO₂e in 2022. The National Adaptation and Mitigation Plan (2022) sets the goal of limiting emissions to 359 MtCO₂e by 2030 and achieving carbon neutrality by 2050.

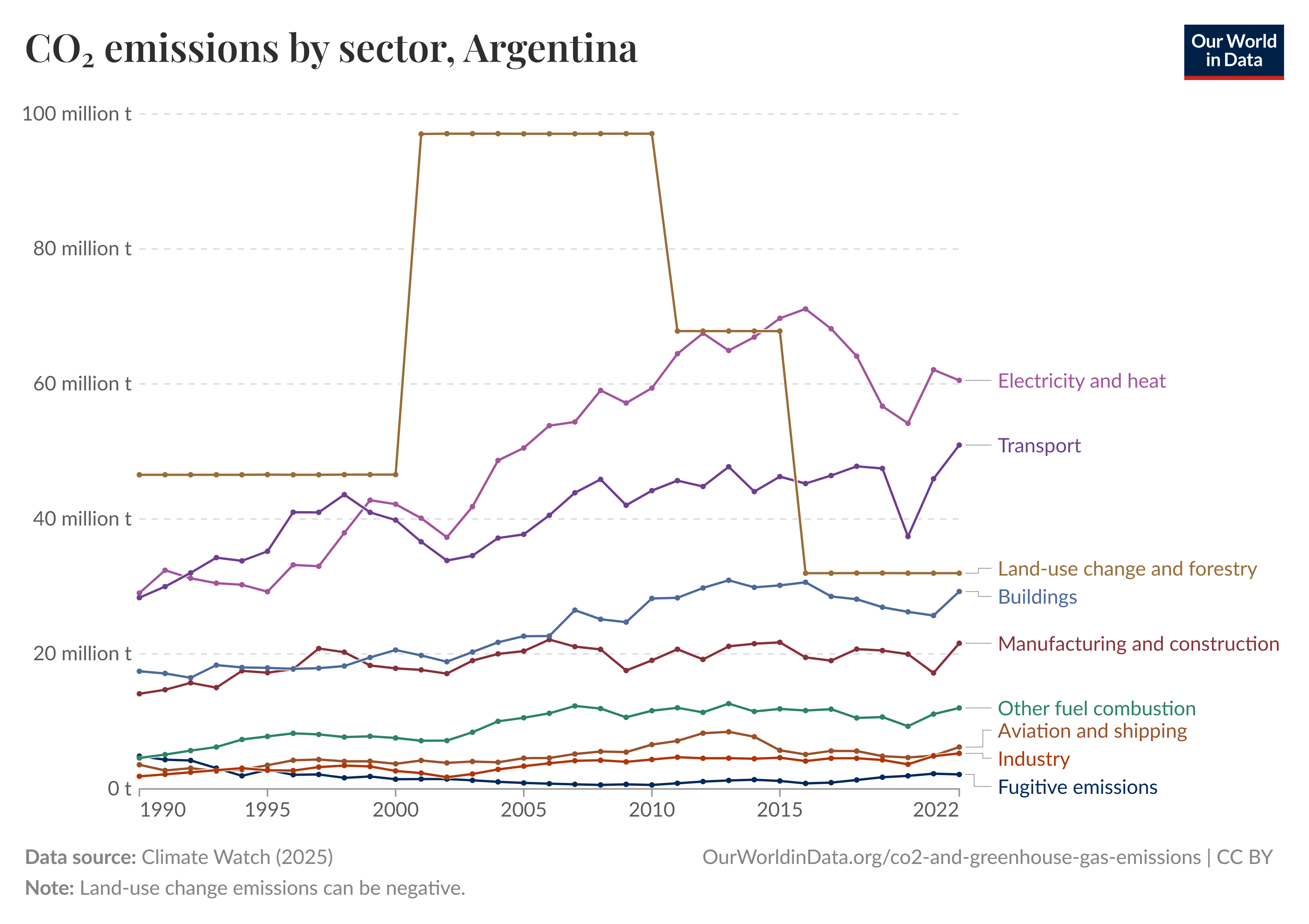
CO₂ emissions by sector in Argentina (2023). Source: Our World in Data, CC BY 4.0.

Electricity is the most emitting sector, driven by a high dependence on natural gas for generation. According to CAMMESA, natural gas has represented more than 55% of power generation in recent years. This dependence is reinforced by resource availability from the Vaca Muerta formation and long-standing government subsidies for gas consumption.

Another significant factor is transportation, where the country relies heavily on road-based freight. Following the privatization in Argentina and decline of the national railway system in the 1990s, more than 90% of long-distance cargo is transported by diesel trucks.

Major stationary emission hubs are concentrated in the Bahía Blanca petrochemical complex, the Rosario–San Lorenzo corridor along the Paraná River, the Campana–Zárate region, and Greater Buenos Aires. These areas host cement and steel production (including companies such as Loma Negra and Cementos Avellaneda), petrochemical clusters, and thermal power plants.

== Geological storage potential ==
Scientific assessments from CONICET and private sector initiatives, such as the AR-CO₂ Atlas developed by Y-TEC ("YPF Tecnología"), evaluate subsurface formations based on depth, permeability, reservoir volume, and sealing capacity. These studies indicate that several sedimentary basins in Argentina offer large-scale potential for geological CO₂ storage.

Potential sedimentary basins for CCS in Argentina
| Sedimentary basin | Assessment | Relevance |
|---|---|---|
| Neuquén Basin | Most suitable | Depleted hydrocarbon reservoirs; proximity to Neuquén industrial cluster and Vaca Muerta. |
| Golfo San Jorge Basin | High potential | Mature oil fields in Patagonia suitable for deep saline storage. |
| Magallanes Basin | Potential | Southern onshore and offshore structures. |
| Cuyo Basin | Under evaluation | Research on deep saline aquifers and unminable coal seams. |

== Transport and infrastructure ==
Argentina's extensive natural gas infrastructure provides a pipeline network connecting western production basins with industrial hubs and export centers in the central and eastern zones. While dedicated CO₂ pipelines would be required, existing infrastructure may facilitate development by streamlining land access and permitting, potentially linking emission hubs like Bahía Blanca to storage sites in the Neuquén Basin.

== Projects and pilot initiatives ==
The first public-private intent for a CCS project was initiated on 28 November 2023, when Wintershall Dea, YPF, and Dow Inc. signed a Memorandum of Understanding (MoU). The agreement launched a twelve-month study to evaluate the feasibility of CCS in the Bahía Blanca industrial port region.

== Policy and regulatory framework ==
As of 2025, Argentina lacks a specific legal framework governing permanent CO₂ storage. However, analysts suggest that regulations for subsurface injection related to Enhanced Oil Recovery (EOR), contained within the Hydrocarbons Law 17.319, could serve as a basis for future CCS regulation.

== Hydrogen development ==
Recent energy transition studies consider CO₂ capture as a potential enabler for blue hydrogen production. Analysts are evaluating pathways to integrate geological storage with natural gas and wind resources to produce low-carbon hydrogen, particularly in Patagonia and the Neuquén Province, where these resources are available.

== See also ==
- Carbon capture and storage
- Climate change in Argentina
- Electricity sector in Argentina
- Energy in Argentina
- Vaca Muerta
- Renewable energy in Argentina
