= Compañía Administradora del Mercado Mayorista Eléctrico Sociedad Anónima =

Argentinian electrical company

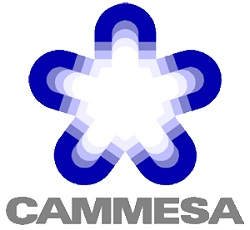
- Founded: July 1992
- Headquarters: Argentina

CAMMESA (Argentine Wholesale Electricity Market Clearing Company) (Spanish: Compañía Administradora del Mercado Eléctrico Mayorista S.A.) is an Argentinian company which operates the wholesale energy market of the country.

It was created by Executive Decree in 1992 to operate the Argentine Interconnection system, planning the power generation required and managing energy dispatch by generators, and for regulation of the spot and term wholesale electric energy markets.

Despite being a private enterprise, as the retail electricity sector in Argentina faces heavy state regulation including low tariffs, the company has been dependent on public subsidies for years. Energy generation costs are not fully passed through to final customers. The spread between the generation cost and the fixed tariffs is covered by CAMMESA, which then makes the company dependent on public subsidies to compensate the generation companies. Also, starting from 2013, all thermal power generation companies are required to buy any required fuel through CAMMESA. This restriction was only lifted for a short period between November 2018 and December 2019, when it was last put in place again.

== History ==
In 1992, Argentina became one of the first countries to implement a comprehensive reform of its electricity sector. In the midst of several public companies privatizations in Argentina, the Electric Energy Regime law (Law 24.065) was passed. Three public companies were split into 27 generation companies, 7 transmission companies and several distribution companies. In its 35th article, the Law mandates the creation of a National Cargoes Dispatch, to be created in the legal form of a sociedad anónima (a private enterprise). This was implemented with the 1192 decree, which created CAMMESA.

The law also created the Wholesale Energy Market of Argentina (Mercado Eléctrico Mayorista - MEM).

This reform was based in the privatizations made in the United Kingdom Energy Sector in the 1990s. It aimed for a greater transparency, bringing increased competition and investments.

Since the 2001-2000 crisis and devaluation of peso, the electricity sector in Argentina faces heavy price regulations which froze all inflation-indexation mechanisms. The wholesale electricity price is fixed since that year using the natural gas variable power production cost (regardless different power plants using different fuels). This put CAMMESA in a difficult spot, since it had to pay the electricity generator companies

Since 2013 the company has been centralizing all the fuel purchases for power generation, excepting a brief period between 2018 and 2019 when every power plant could, if they wanted, choose a different provider.

== Ownership ==
CAMMESA is a private company. It is owned in an 80% by the different companies comprising the Wholesale Energy Market of Argentina (power generation and transport companies, as well as the Association of Large Energy Users), and the remaining 20% of shares are in the hands of the Argentine government.

The board is composed by ten regular and ten alternate directors. Each shareholder (which are generation, transmission and distribution companies from the wholesale energy market, as well as large energy users) are entitled to appoint two regular and two alternate directors. The other directors are appointed by the government, one is the Secretary of Energy, and the last member is chosen with the assent of the private shareholders, but subject to the veto of the Secretary of Energy. In the event of a tie, these votes of the later two members are worth the double.

== Operation ==
The company performs several tasks in the Argentinian energy sector, among which are: The dispatch of energy into the Interconnection, planning energy capacity needs and optimizing energy use, monitoring the operation of the wholesale term market, the exchange of electric power with other countries, and purchasing and administrating fuels for the wholesale market thermal generators.

== RenovAr ==
In 2016, the 27.191 law created a stimulus programme for renewable energies. The act establishes a goals system for yearly renewable energies share in the Energy mix of Argentina to reach a 20% share in December 2025.

To follow on these goals, the RenovAr (renovate) programme was creating, granting tax benefits and financing stimulus. It is run by CAMMESA on behalf of the Secretary of Energy.

Several Rounds of public bids for renewable energy projects were held, in which companies present investment plans and the price of the energy output. The government establishes a maximum US$/MW/h price for each renewable technology, as well as output ranges desired.

=== Round 1 ===
The first round was held on 2016. 59 projects were approved, for over 2400 MW power.

=== Round 2 ===
The second round was held in August 2017, and approved 88 projects for 2042 MW power.

== See also ==
- Electricity sector in Argentina
- Argentine Interconnection System
