= Argentine Interconnection System =

Wide area electric power grid of Argentina

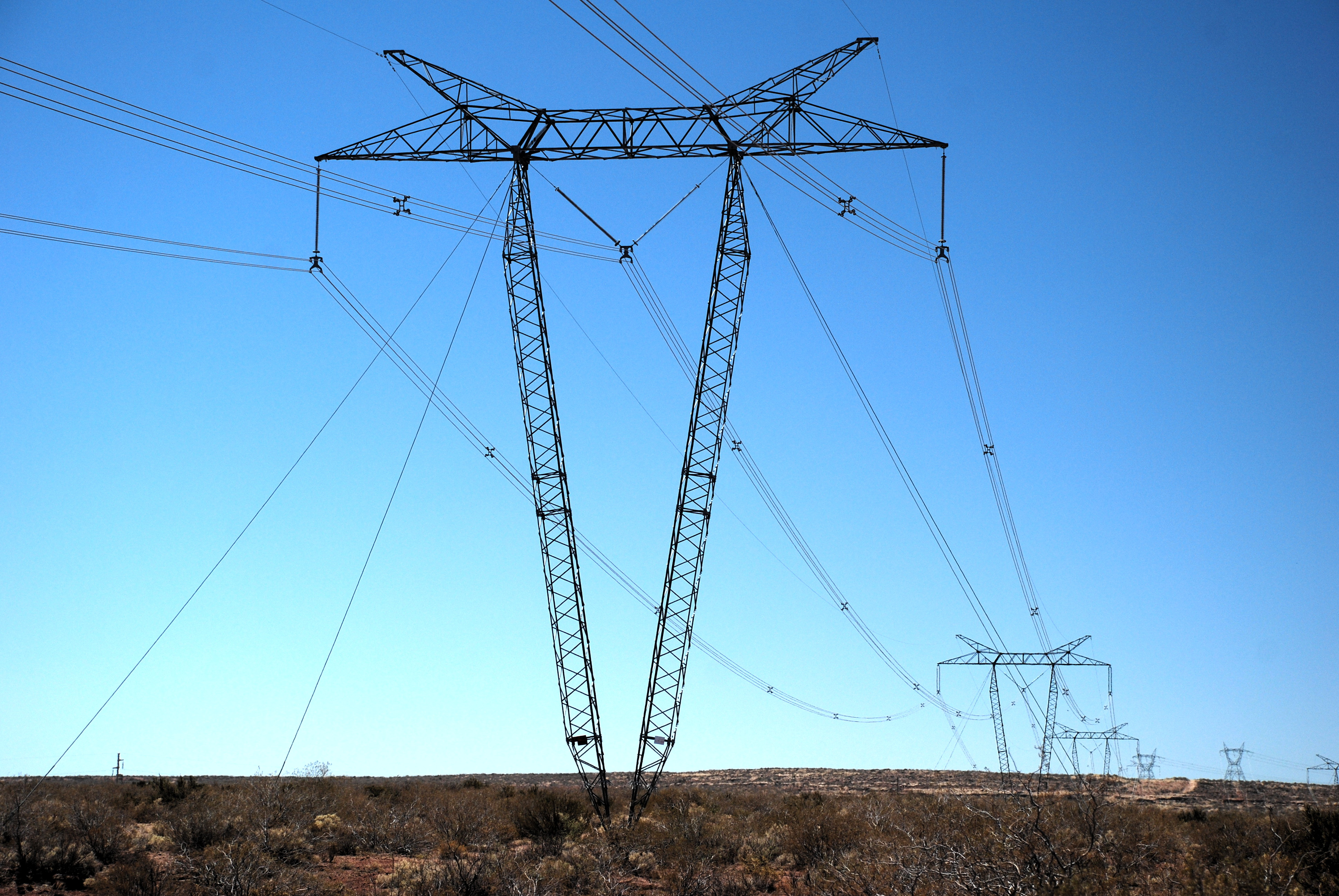
500 kV transmission line in Comahue.

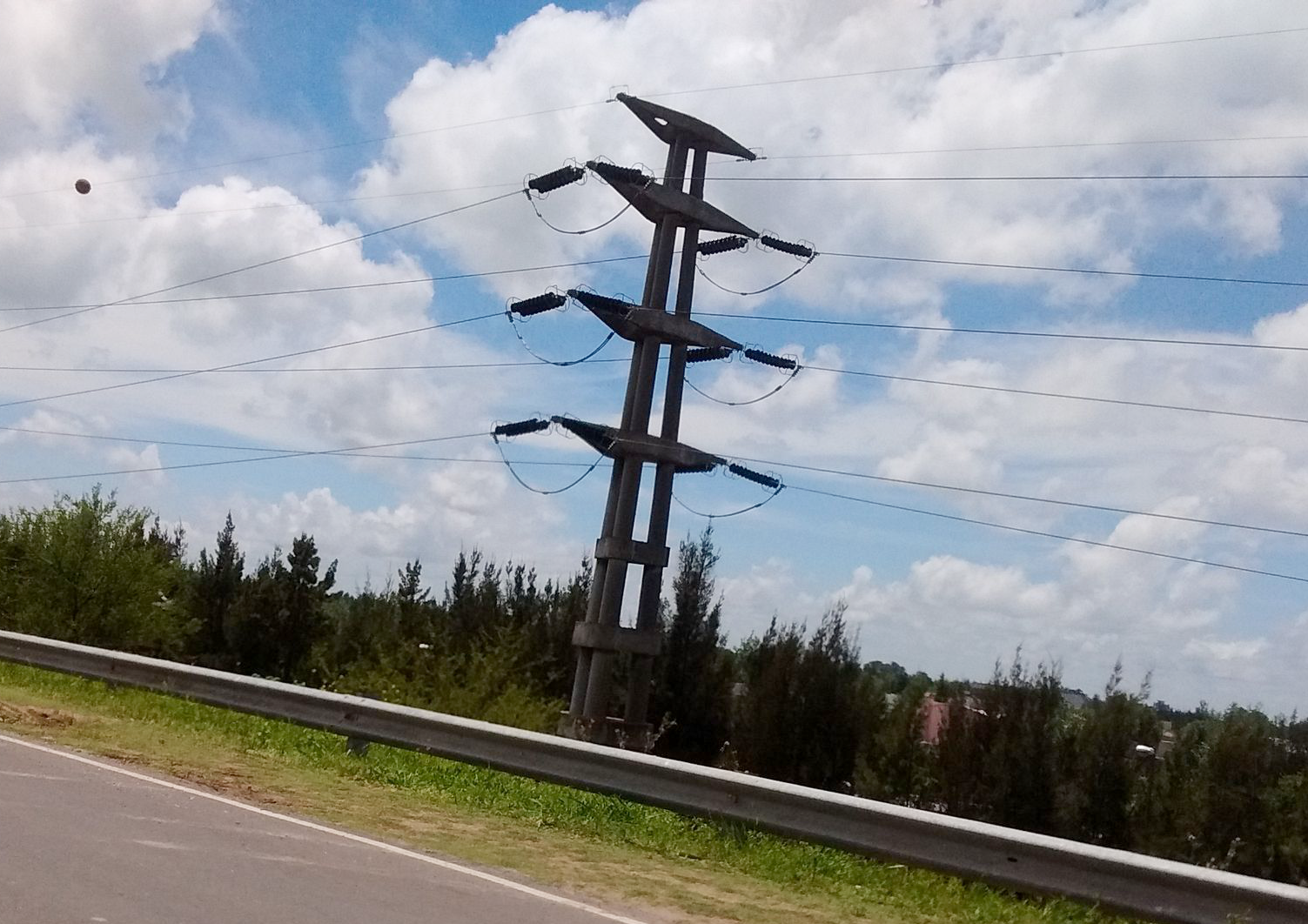
Unlike in other countries, many power lines with a voltage up to 220 kV are placed on concrete pylons.

The Argentine Interconnection System (Spanish: Sistema Argentino de Interconexión, SADI) is a wide area synchronous grid that links the regional networks of all Argentinian provinces, with the exception of Tierra del Fuego. It is also connected to the power grids of several neighboring countries.

The network is 20,296 kilometres (12,611 mi) long, of which 14,197 kilometres (8,822 mi) represent 500 kV power lines. These power lines are operated by Transener.

== History ==
The interconnection system began by including transmission lines and substations built by AyEE, HIDRONOR and others constructed by private initiative. Those lines primarily linked the generation centers distributed along the country with the major consumption center in the Greater Buenos Aires area.

In 1947, the General Direction of Water and Electric Power was created by presidential decree, with the task of planning, construction and operation of electrical power plants, transmission lines and substations.

In 1960, Act 15336 (Electric Energy Law) is approved, recognizing a "National Interconnection Network" that would integrate all the country's regional networks. This would change the jurisdiction of those networks from a provincial to a national control. This new national network would be controlled by a new organism to be created, the Federal Council of Electric Power, under the national Energy & Fuel Secretary structure.

This new organism would have representatives of the central government as well as the provinces and the City of Buenos Aires, intending to unify criteria and not only satisfy the interests of Buenos Aires.

In 1991, the State Reform law brought privatization for the energy companies, creating a new regulatory framework for the energy and utilities sector. This would be included in the 24065 Act, which created the Wholesale Energy Market and the National Electricity Regulatory Entity (ENRE). It also creates a new public entity to regulate the Interconnection, the National Cargoes Dispatch (DNDC), which would incorporate in 1002 in the form of a sociedad anónima (a private corporation) with the name Compañía Administradora del Mercado Mayorista Eléctrico Sociedad Anónima (CAMMESA).

== Main figures ==
According to the 2019 annual report by CAMMESA, that year the network showed the following figures:

Energy Demand by Region
Region	Annual Demand (in GWh)	Share %
Greater Buenos Aires	48,553	37.7%
Littoral	15,638	12.1%
Buenos Aires Province	14,903	11.6%
Center (Cordoba and San Luis Provinces)	11,240	8.7%
Northwest	10,206	7.9%
Northeast	9,294	7.2%
Cuyo	8,050	6.2%
Patagonia (excl. Río Negro and Neuquén)	6,078	4.7%
Comahue (La Pampa, Río Negro and Neuquén)	4,943	3.8%
Total	128,905	100%

Electrical generation by energy source
Heat Source	Plant Type	Annual Power (in MW)
Hydraulic	Hydropower	10,812
Fossil fuel	Combined cycle	11,245
Fossil fuel	Natural Gas Turbine	7,396
Fossil fuel	Steam Turbine	4,251
Fossil fuel	Diesel	1,653
Nuclear	Nuclear	1,755
Renewable Energy	Wind Power	1,609
Renewable Energy	Solar Energy	439
Renewable Energy	Renewable hidraulic	498
Renewable Energy	Biogas	44
Renewable Energy	Biomass	2

== International links ==
The system connects to several neighboring countries:

- Argentina–Chile
  - Interandes: TermoAndes – Chilgener (from 2001 on, AES TermoAndes)
- Paraguay–Argentina
  - Carlos Antonio López (Paraguay) – Eldorado (Argentina). 132 kV
  - Guarambaré (Paraguay) – Clorinda (Argentina). 220 kV
- Argentina–Uruguay
  - Salto Grande Dam (1.890 MW power station)
- Argentina–Brasil
  - Paso de los Libres – Uruguaiana (50 MW line)
  - Rincón – Garabi – Ita I
  - Rincón – Garabi – Ita II

== 2019 Blackout ==
On 16 June 2019, a large-scale power outage struck most of Argentina, all of Uruguay, and parts of Paraguay. It was caused by an operational misbehavior from Transener, a transmission lines operator in Argentina.

A short circuit which lowered demand, caused an excess of power generation in the grid, a lack of synchronization of power plants, loss of balance, and a low frequency in the network, triggering massive automatic disconnections from the grid. This caused a blackout that, in a matter of 30 seconds, came to affect 50 million users in the continent.
