= Ongamira =

Valley in Argentina

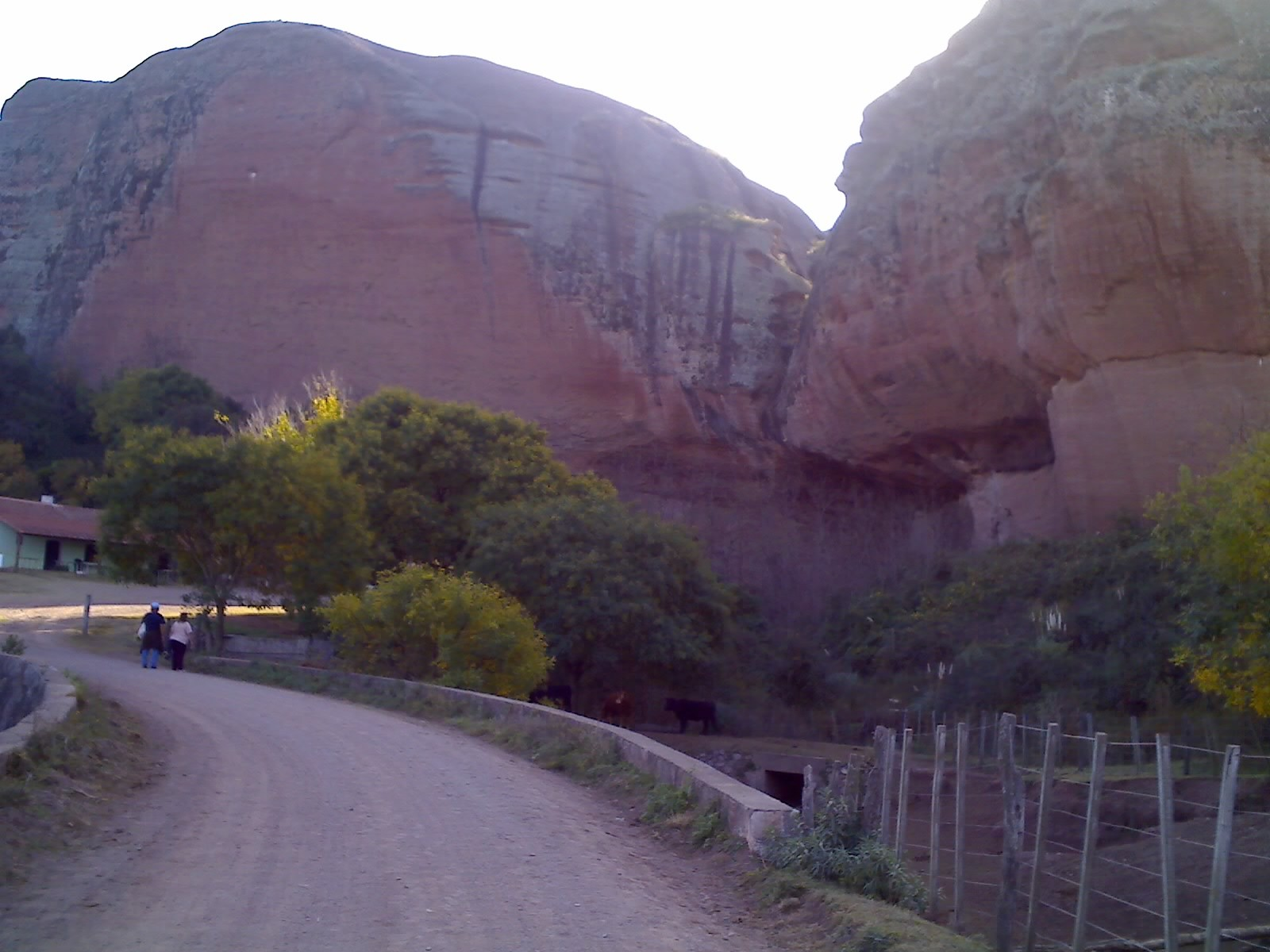
Rock formations of Ongamira.

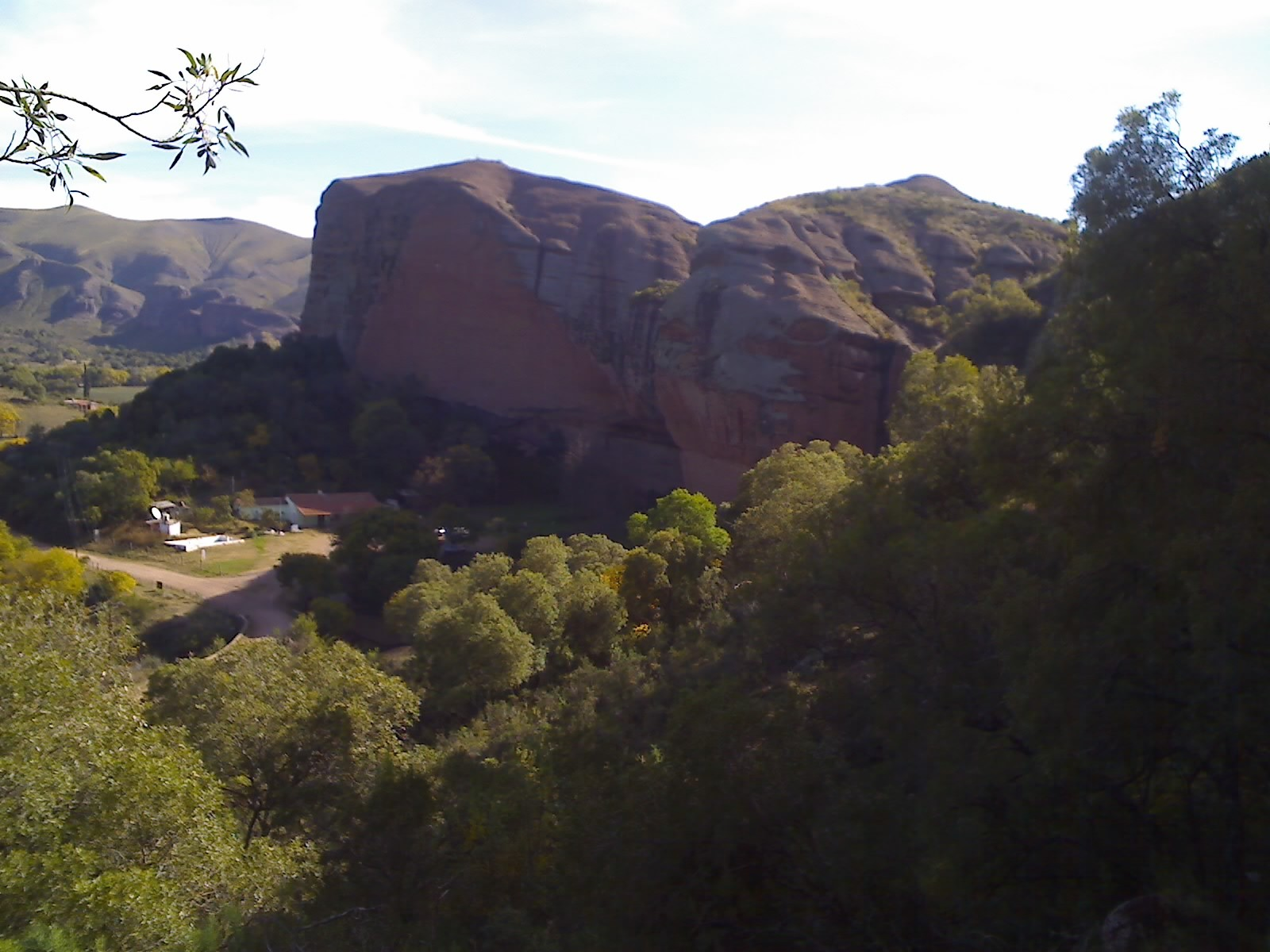
Ongamira's landscape

Ongamira is a valley located north of the Valle de Punilla and northwest of the city of Córdoba, Argentina. The name of this valley derives from the word "Unca-mira", where "Unca" refers to the name of a tribal chief, and "mira" refers to a place. Ongamira is known for its caves and grottoes, which are both naturally and archaeologically relevant.

== Geography ==
Having dense and rough vegetation, the valley of Ongamira is characterized by the existence of small and, often disguised, waterfalls, as well as by the presence of red hills that surround the valley.

== History ==
Córdoba's founder, Jerónimo Luis de Cabrera, granted the lands of Ongamira to Blas de Rosales, who was the first Spanish conquistador to reach the valley in 1573. After a year of bloody confrontations with the Comechingones, the region's indigenous peoples, the Spanish took control of the valley. Although colonial-era narratives have depicted that the conquest of the valley culminated in the mass suicide of the indigenous populations, recent archaeological research has shown that the alleged mass suicide is a myth since there is no evidence confirming such an event. During excavations, numerous human remains have been recovered, but these are typically associated with domestic contexts rather than cemeteries, as burials were often conducted in inhabited spaces. Radiocarbon dating indicated that the remains are more than 2,500 or 3,000 years old, which predates the period of Spanish-Indigenous contact.

As the archaeologist G. R. Cattaneo (2023) states:

This myth is part of a discourse that has a racist basis, which implies the thought that indigenous people became extinct, and that every last Comechingon died there (Ongamira), thus the land was empty and could be occupied and used.

In reality, indigenous communities such as the Comechingones, Sanavirones, and Ranqueles continue to inhabit Cordoba, together with more than 20 others, demonstrating that these communities neither disappeared nor committed mass suicide, but persisted in the territory.

== Archaeology ==
The valley is a significant site in regional archaeology and for certain epistemological discussions that occurred during the development of the discipline in Argentina in the mid-20th century. Its first systematic explorer was the engineer Aníbal Montes, who initiated his work in the area in the 1930s. Montes’ description of the place and first interpretations about the archaeological interest of the valley:

The western end of the valley is enclosed by a great bastion in the shape of a horseshoe, in which the internal side is a raised bank which forms a rockshelter or protrusion. Therefore, constituting the classic “shelter under rocks” of archaeologists, and as it could not be prevented, there lived the indigenous peoples in their period of hunter-gatherers, before they became farmers and stepped out to the plains to live in houses.

— Aníbal Montes, 1941

The most relevant formation for archaeological studies is the Deodoro Roca Rockshelter, where Montes defined the areas for excavation after discovering human remains.

In the following decades, in the 40s and 50s, the archaeologist Alberto Rex Gonzalez developed master chronological sequences and human settlement patterns based on his findings of excavations at key sites in the Central Hills of Argentina, among which the Deodoro Roca Rockshelter in Ongamira played an essential role in the Argentine archeology. The discoveries made in the mid-20th century were decisive for debates on the antiquity of human occupation in Córdoba and for establishing models of pre-Hispanic indigenous life.

Since 2010, new systematic excavations by the Proyecto Arqueológico Ongamira (Ongamira Archaeological Project) have been carried out in the Ongamira Valley, specifically in the Deodoro Roca Rockshelter, where more than 100 archaeological units have been identified. A new logical and vertical sequence of occupation has been revealed with these units, spanning from the earliest to the most recent periods. It has also provided an empirical basis for discussion on the chronology and the associations of material culture in the area.

=== Ongamira Archaeological Project ===
The Proyecto Arqueológico Ongamira has been running since 2010. It is directed by investigators from the Instituto de Antropología de Córdoba (IDACOR-CONICET). This multidisciplinary team includes archaeologists, geologists, chemists, paleontologists, physicists, biologists, and students, whose objective is to understand the relationship between past societies and the landscape. They also strive to preserve a heritage that is at risk of urban development projects and looting.

This project has allowed for the identification of more than 60 archaeological sites in the valley, with occupations spanning from 7,000 years to the Spanish-indigenous contact period. The current diggings reach depths of between 6 and 7 metres. And, given the delicate nature of archaeological work (which is done with trowels and brushes), it is expected that this work will continue for a couple of years without reaching levels lacking human presence.

Besides the research, the project carries out activities of scientific dissemination and community work with rural schools and locals, seeking to raise awareness about the importance of the archaeological and natural heritage of the valley.

=== Techniques and Archaeological Studies ===
In Ongamira, researchers employ a variety of modern scientific methodologies to gain further insight:

- Zooarchaeology: the analysis of animal bone remains to identify the species consumed by the people, to analyze their diet, and their role in the ecosystem. The species recorded included Guanacos, pampas deer, and rheas, which are now absent from the region due to environmental changes.
- Lithology and lithic taphonomy: the study of quartz artifacts, as they were the predominant raw material in the area. Fractures are analyzed to differentiate natural processes from human modifications.
- Actualistic studies: the experiments carried out to observe how factors such as the sun, rain, or trampling leave marks on bones and stones to compare them with archaeological findings.
- Geoarchaeology and micropaleontology: the analysis of sediments, microfossils, and stratigraphic samples, which enable the dating of levels using radiocarbon and luminescence techniques.
- Digital technologies: the use of photogrammetry, laser scanning, and three-dimensional measurements to digitally reconstruct the excavated sites and to accurately locate each object in its original context.

=== Ways of Life in the Valley ===
The groups that inhabited Ongamira were nomadic societies that resided in temporary camps. The hearths found show evidence of brief use; on occasions, they were lit and extinguished within minutes, suggesting short stays. The diet of the people included guanaco meat and other smaller animals, as well as fruits from the native forest, with trees such as carob, chañar, and mistol. No evidence of interpersonal violence was found, suggesting relatively peaceful lifestyles in small family groups.

Rockshelters and caves were the preferred places to live because of the protection they provided from the weather and their symbolic value. These places also have the ideal conditions for the preservation of archaeological remains, which explains the abundance of evidence in the area.

=== Preservation, Heritage and Community ===
The archeological project in Ongamira is not limited to archaeological diggings. Under Argentine legislation, the recovered materials must be safeguarded in a public repository of the Cordoba Cultural Agency, which belongs to the Provincial Heritage Department. They remain under guard while being studied for approximately two years. Then they are sent to local, provincial, or university museums. Many of these objects are digitized and stored in open repositories such as the Suquía repository, which allows public access to primary data and archaeological collections.

There are also temporary exhibitions, such as the Museo Viajero, promoting activities with local communities and rural schools. Tourism, one of the principal economic activities of the valley, focuses on these initiatives, reinforcing local identity and respect for ancient territories.

Nonetheless, Ongamira’s heritage faces constant threats: looting, road construction (such as the Punilla highway), and the lack of consideration by the state in infrastructure projects. These procedures not only destroy archeological sites but also disrupt the region’s historical memory.
