= Climate change in Argentina =

Emissions, impacts and responses of Argentina related to climate change

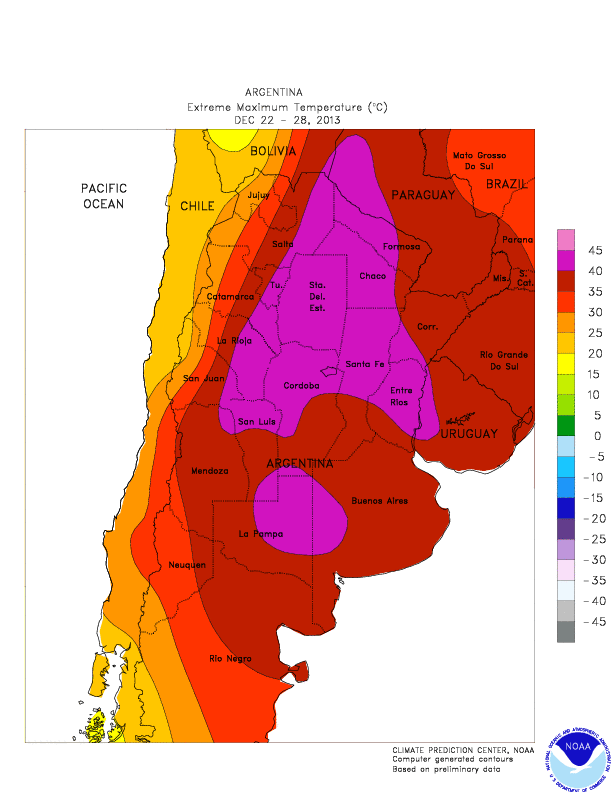
Absolute maximum temperatures recorded in Argentina during the December 2013 heat wave. This heat wave was the longest and the most intense in Argentina.

Climate change is predicted to have significant effects on the living conditions in Argentina. The climate of Argentina is changing with regards to precipitation patterns and temperatures. The highest increase in the precipitation (from the period 1960–2010) has occurred in the eastern parts of the country. The increase in precipitation has led to more variability in precipitation from year to year in the northern parts of the country, with a higher risk of prolonged droughts, limiting agriculture in these regions.

Though temperatures have increased at a slower rate than the global average, nonetheless, these impacts have occurred in many areas. Higher temperatures can reduce winter snowfall, causing river flow to decrease (less water available), which can reduce hydroelectric energy production. Again, losses of up to 40% had been observed. If these trends continue, it is predicted that climate change will exacerbate existing natural disasters such as increasing the intensity and frequency of floods or create new ones. By 2050, Argentina is predicted to see a 65% increase in drought frequency while heatwaves will last 6247% longer.

The country has received a very low rating from the Climate Change Performance Index, as of April 2025.

== Impacts on the environment ==
=== Greenhouse gas emissions ===
In 2023 Argentina emitted approximately 422 million tonnes of greenhouse gases, making it around the 22nd highest emitting country in the world. This is equivalent to around 9.3 tonnes emitted per person.

=== Temperature and weather changes ===
Köppen climate classification map for Argentina for 1980–2016

2071–2100 map under the most intense climate change scenario. Mid-range scenarios are currently considered more likely

Mean temperatures have increased by 0.5 °C (0.90 °F) from 1901–2012, which is slightly lower than the global average. Temperatures in the Andean part of Patagonia have increased by more than 1 °C (1.80 °F), which has caused the retreat of almost all of the glaciers. This affects water availability to arid areas of the country that depend on it.

Higher temperatures can reduce winter snowfall, causing river flow to decrease (less water available), which can reduce hydroelectric energy production; losses of up to 40% had been observed. Outside Patagonia, mean temperatures have increased at a smaller rate since the increase in minimum temperatures is counteracted by the decrease in maximum temperatures.

The increase in minimum temperatures in much of Argentina outside Patagonia is attributed to the increase in the concentration of greenhouse gases in the atmosphere. The decrease in maximum temperatures is a consequence of higher precipitation, which is associated with higher cloud coverage and evaporation, processes that tend to reduce maximum temperatures north of 40^{o}S. In Patagonia, the increase in mean temperatures is higher than the increase in minimum temperatures and is due to the change in atmospheric circulation, not just only the increase in greenhouse effect.

Ozone depletion has played a major role in changing the atmospheric circulation patterns. There has been a decrease in the days with frost, and increases in the number of hot nights throughout the country. Heat waves, which is defined as 3 consecutive days in which the temperature exceeds the 90th percentile with respect to the 1961–1990 period have become more common and intense between 1961–2010.

Within the next 2 or 3 decades (2016–2035), mean temperatures are predicted to increase by 0.5 to 1.0 °C (0.90 to 1.80 °F) under the two scenarios (RCP 4.5 and RCP 8.5) from the IPCC Fifth Assessment Report. Under the RCP 4.5 scenario, temperatures will increase by 1.0 °C (1.80 °F) throughout the country, though this increase will be more pronounced in the northwest where temperatures would increase by 2 to 2.5 °C (3.60 to 4.50 °F). In the more severe RCP 8.5 scenario, the projected increased in temperatures will be higher, reaching 3.5 °C (6.30 °F) in the northwest. In both scenarios, the projected warming will be more pronounced during the summer months. The predicted trend for precipitation is not as clear as the one for temperature. In the northern and central regions, precipitation is predicted to increase while in much of central–western Argentina and Patagonia, precipitation is predicted to decrease. Because Argentina is potentially vulnerable to climate change, such projected changes based on the models could enhance current or create new problems associated with climate change on Argentina.

The following images show the projected changes in the types of climate according to the Köppen climate classification.

==== Precipitation and extreme weather events ====
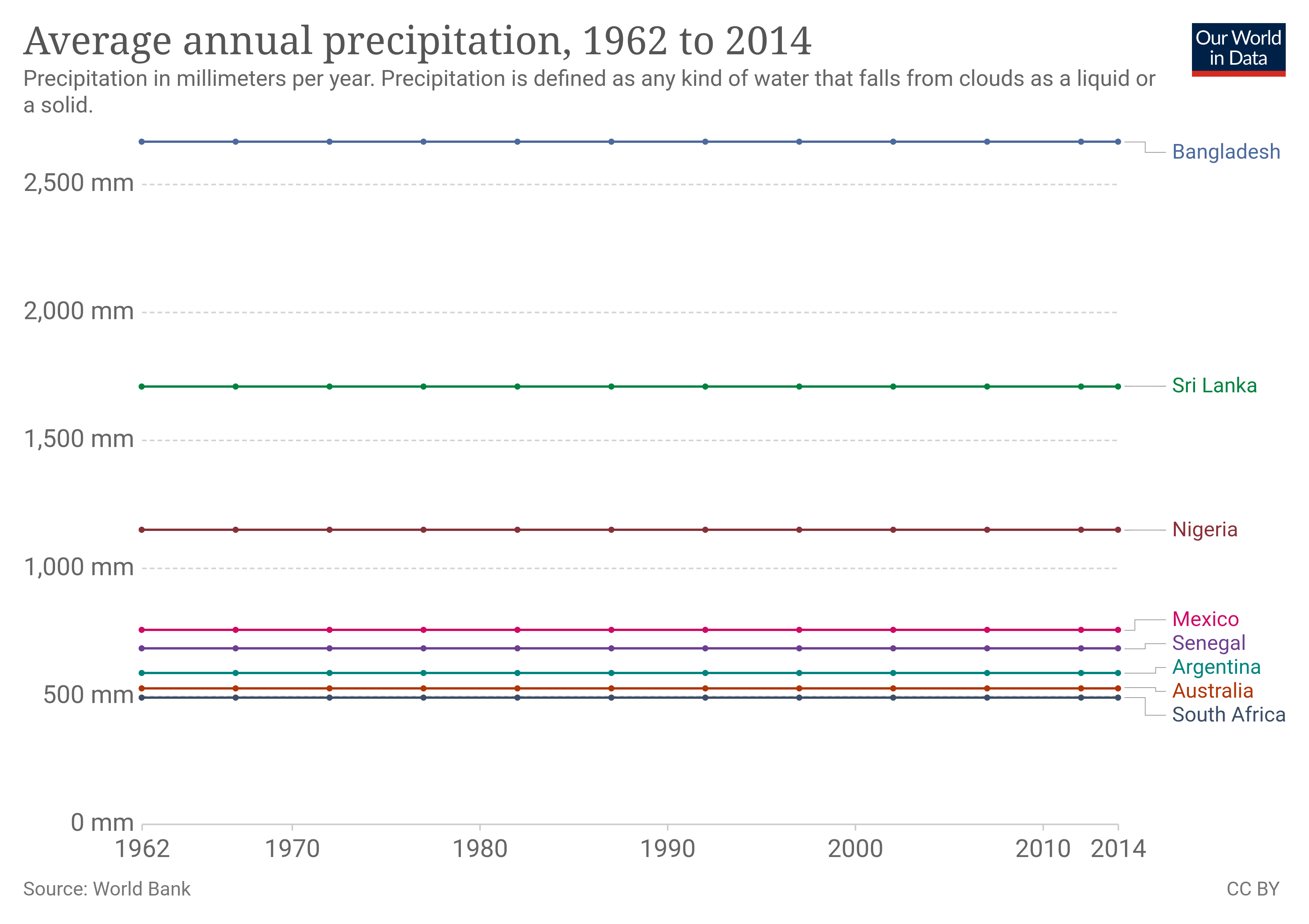
Average precipitation per year in some country

There has been an increase in annual precipitation in almost all of Argentina, particularly in the northeast and central parts of the country. Since 1970, precipitation has increased by 10% in the northeast while in parts of La Pampa Province and western parts of Buenos Aires province, it has increased by 40%. The highest increases in the precipitation (from the period 1960–2010) have occurred in the eastern parts of the country. In contrast, the Andean part of Patagonia along with the Cuyo region has seen a decrease in precipitation, leading to a reduction in river flow in the last 100 years. Some parts of Patagonia in the Andes have seen a 30%–50% reduction in precipitation since the middle of the 20th century.

In March 2025, catastrophic flooding in Bahia Blanca, Argentina, killed 16 people and was linked to climate change. Scientists from the World Weather Attribution found that extreme heat and humidity, exacerbated by climate change, contributed to the heavy rains. Prior to the floods, temperatures in central Argentina exceeded 40 °C, and a humid heatwave combined with moisture from the Amazon, resulting in 300 mm of rain in just six hours. These conditions, which would have been nearly impossible without climate change, made the floods unprecedented. While extreme heat events remain rare, occurring every 50 to 100 years, climate change is making them more frequent. Rapid urbanization in Bahia Blanca, coupled with insufficient infrastructure, worsened the impact.

=== Sea level rise ===
In much of the coastal regions of Argentina, it will not suffer permanent flooding and loss of land associated with sea level rise since much of the coastal regions are high cliffs. Nonetheless, potential agricultural land could be lost if sea levels rise by 1 m (3.3 ft). Sea level rise will impact the country through an increase in the frequency of storm surges in coastal areas, including Buenos Aires and a study has suggested that Buenos Aires could be impacted significantly by sea level rise.

== Impacts on people ==
=== Economic impacts ===
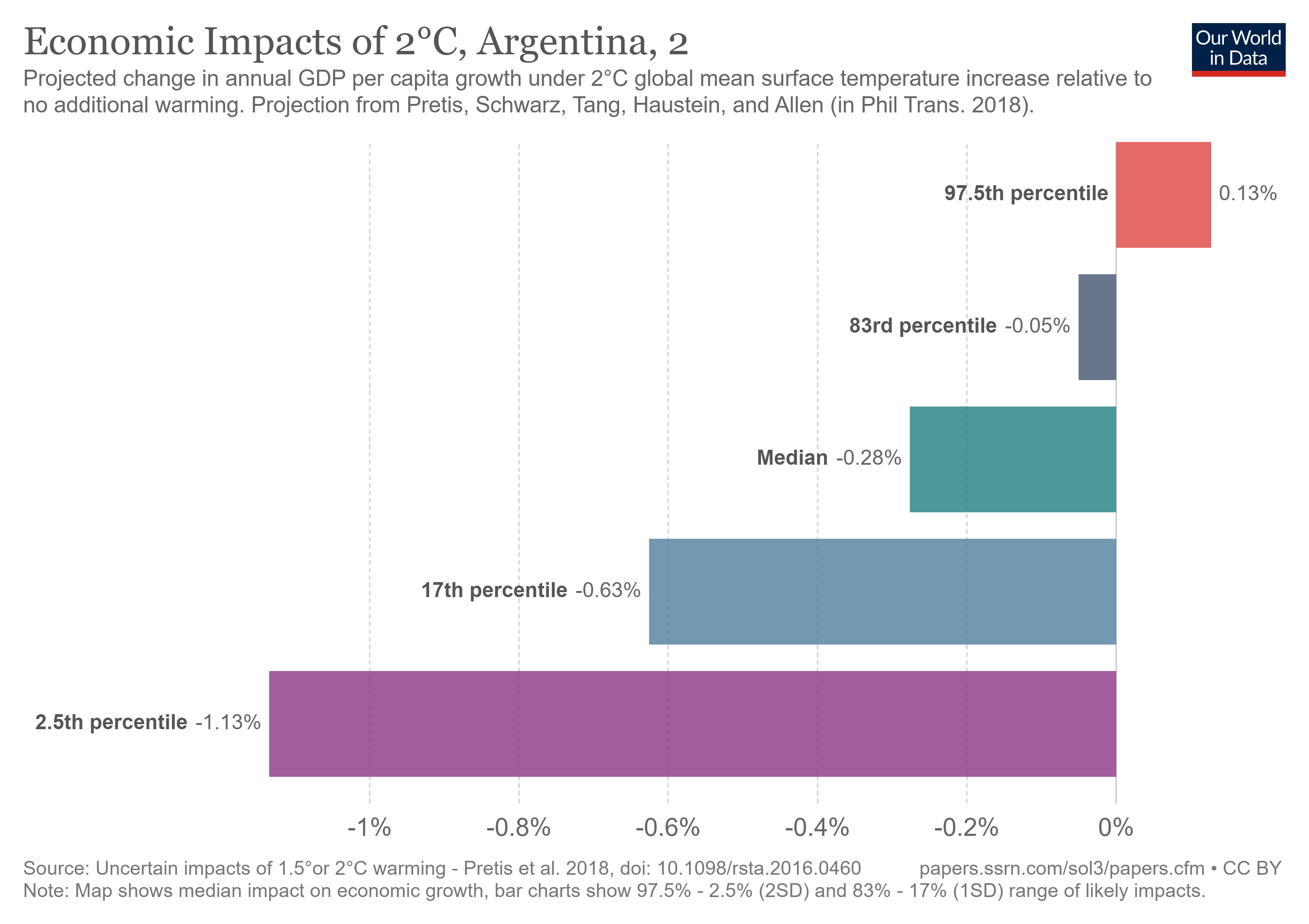
Economic impacts of 2°C in Argentina

==== Agriculture ====
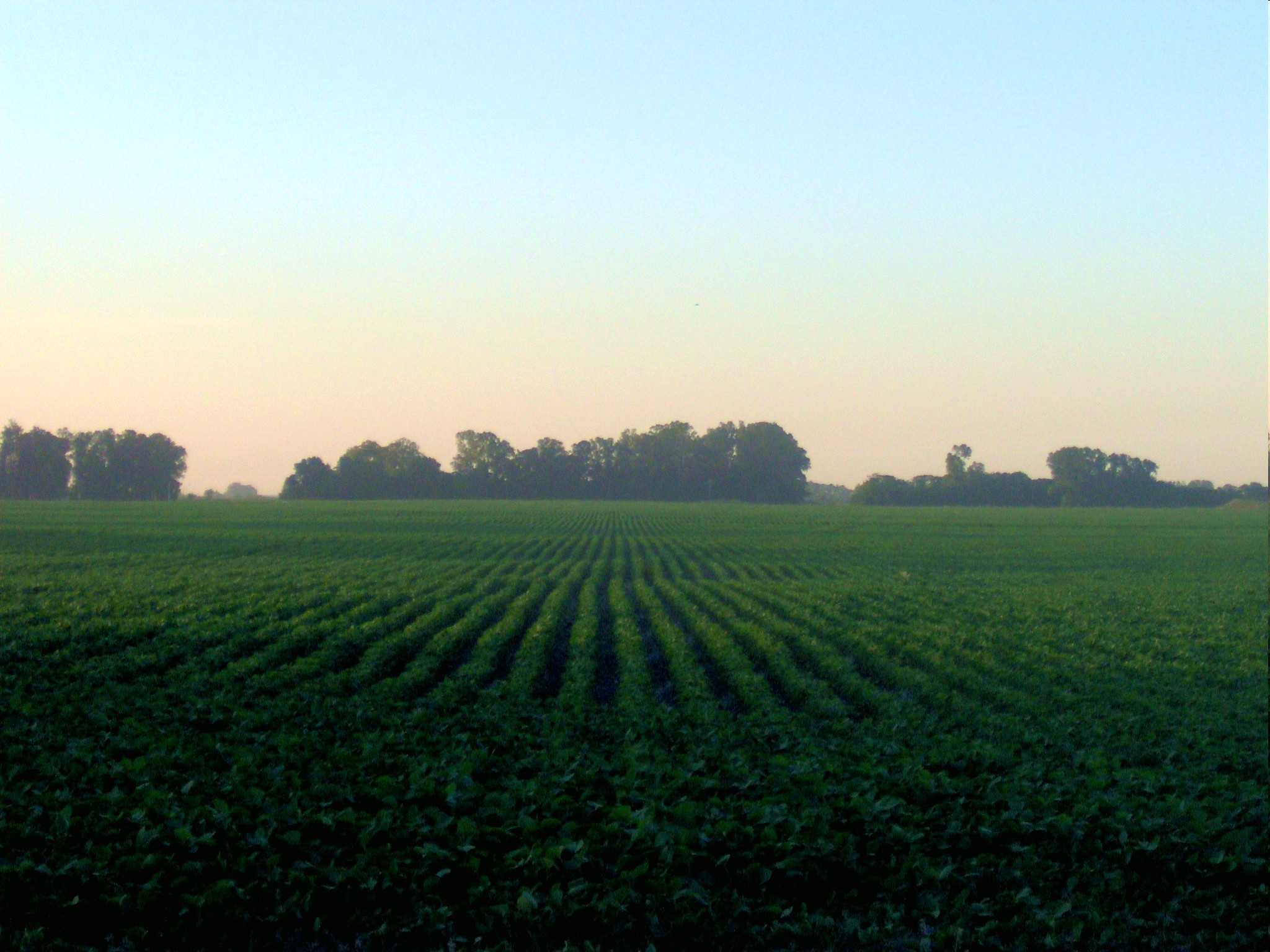
Soybean field in the Province of Buenos Aires, Argentina

Agriculture will be affected by climate change. The decrease in precipitation that has been observed in the Andes will be predicted to continue to decrease, affecting hydroelectric energy even more. Glaciers are predicted to continue to recede and melt or in some areas, disappear. It is predicted that the Cuyo region could face a potential water crisis due to an increase in water demand owing to a reduction in river streamflows and higher evapotranspiration from a combination of lower precipitation and higher temperatures. Higher temperatures will cause the snow cover to melt earlier in the year, causing a rise in river flow in the spring months and a drop in summer, which is when water demand is the highest for agriculture. The higher water demand would lead to higher groundwater use for irrigation which drives up the costs for irrigation, cause the deterioration in the water quality, and lead to the eventual depletion of aquifers. In northern Patagonia, a similar situation is projected in which negative impacts can occur in the future for fruit and vegetable growing owing to a reduction in available water. It is predicted that between 2020–2040, the river flow in the Colorado River and the Chubut river would decrease by 20% due to more irrigation.

In the last half of the 20th century, the lack of snow at the highest peaks in the Cuyo region has impacted agriculture and viticulture production due to less water available in the rivers (a reduction in 50% of river flow).

Numerous studies have indicated that the productivity of wheat, soybean and maize will not change that much by the middle of the 21st century. This is because while crop production may increase in the southern and western parts of the Pampas, it will decrease in the northern parts. In the north and central parts of the country, the higher temperatures projected for this region leads to higher evaporation. Combined with little precipitation change for this region, it is probable that it would become more arid, leading to desertification. In areas that normally have a dry winter, a higher evaporation would intensify droughts which would disfavor agriculture.

Since the middle of the 20th century, the 600 mm (24 in) isohyet in the south and the 800 mm (31 in) isohyet in the north, which approximately form the boundaries in which agricultural production is possible had moved more than 100 km (62 mi) to the west, expanding possible agricultural production to these areas.

Although an increase in precipitation will expand agricultural production to the west in areas that were previously too dry and will benefit hydroelectric energy owing to the increase in river flow, there will be an increase the frequency of extreme precipitation events such as flooding, hail and strong winds, which can destroy these agricultural fields. These trends were observed with an increase in the river–stream flows in most of the country excluding rivers originating from the Andes, and increase in extreme precipitation events that led to considerable socioeconomic losses. These extreme precipitation events such as flooding, and hail have occurred more frequently in the east, leading to the destruction of agricultural land in these areas. The increase in precipitation has led to more variability in precipitation from year to year in the northern parts of the country, with a higher risk of prolonged droughts, disfavoring agriculture in these regions.

=== Health impacts ===
Climate change could extend the habitats of vectors carrying tropical diseases such as malaria, Chagas disease, and dengue, as they spread southwards.

=== Impacts on housing ===
Higher temperatures can negatively affect urban areas by affecting the provision of services such as water and energy by increasing the demand for these services. Heat waves, such as the one in 2013–2014 during the summer could become more frequent and intense. These heat waves can impact agricultural production while in urban areas, it places more demand on energy needs. Intense precipitation events could become more common, leading to negative consequences.

Argentina, with much of its population living in urban areas is vulnerable to intense precipitation events since many cities are located near a body of water (rivers, lakes and oceans), which increases the likelihood of suffering from these intense precipitation events such as flooding.

== Mitigation and adaptation ==
In Argentina's Nationally Determined Contribution it has committed to capping net greenhouse gas emissions across its economy to 349 million tonnes by 2030. Argentina has also committed to net zero and carbon neutrality by 2050.

Carbon capture and storage in Argentina (CCS) has been identified in several scientific and policy assessments as a potential mitigation pathway in Argentina, particularly for reducing emissions from hard-to-abate industrial sectors and natural-gas-fired power generation. Although the country does not yet operate commercial-scale CCS facilities, research highlights significant geological storage potential in major sedimentary basins such as the Neuquén Basin, Golfo San Jorge Basin, and Austral–Magallanes Basin. National planning documents, including Argentina’s 2022 National Adaptation and Mitigation Plan, reference CCS and hydrogen technologies as possible long-term decarbonization tools.

== See also ==
- Climate of Argentina
- 2022 Southern Cone heat wave
