= Electricity sector in Argentina =

Electricity sector of Argentina
Data
- Electricity coverage (2016): 100% (total); (LAC total average in 2016: 98.2%)
- Installed capacity (2020): 41,951 MW
- Share of fossil energy: 60.5%
- Share of renewable energy: 33%
- GHG emissions from electricity generation (2011): 67.32 Mt CO_{2}
- Average electricity use (2014): 3,050 kWh per capita
- Distribution losses (2014): 3.3%; (LAC average in 2005: 13.6%)

Consumption by sector (% of total)
- Residential: 41%
- Industrial: 45%
- Commercial and public sector: 13%

Tariffs and financing
- Average residential tariff (US$/kW·h, 2004): 0.0380; (LAC average in 2005: 0.115)
- Average industrial tariff (US$/kW·h, 2006): 0.0386 (LAC average in 2005: 0.107)

Services
- Sector unbundling: Yes
- Share of private sector in generation: 75%
- Share of private sector in transmission: 0%
- Share of private sector in distribution: 75%
- Competitive supply to large users: Yes
- Competitive supply to residential users: No

Institutions
- No. of service providers: Dominating 3 distributors: Edenor; Edesur; Edelap
- Responsibility for transmission: Transener
- Responsibility for regulation: National agency (ENRE) and provincial agencies
- Responsibility for policy-setting: Energy Secretariat
- Responsibility for the environment: Secretariat of Environment and Sustainable Development
- Electricity sector law: Yes (1991)
- Renewable energy law: Yes (1998, modified in 2007)
- CDM transactions related to the electricity sector: 3 registered CDM projects; 673,650 t CO_{2}e annual emissions reductions

The electricity sector in Argentina constitutes the third largest power market in Latin America, after Brazil and Mexico. As of the end of 2025, Argentina had 44.2 GW of installed generation capacity, comprising approximately 57% thermal power, 22% hydropower, 17% renewable energy and 4% nuclear power. Thermal generation also remained the largest source of electricity supply, accounting for about 53% of generation in 2025.

Faced with rising electricity demand (over 6% annually) and declining reserve margins, the government of Argentina is in the process of commissioning large projects, both in the generation and transmission sectors. To keep up with rising demand, it is estimated that about 1,000 MW of new generation capacity are needed each year. An important number of these projects are being financed by the government through trust funds, while independent private initiative is still limited as it has not fully recovered yet from the effects of the 2002 Argentine economic crisis.

The electricity sector was unbundled in generation, transmission and distribution by the reforms carried out in the early 1990s. Generation occurs in a competitive and mostly liberalized market in which 75% of the generation capacity is owned by private utilities. In contrast, the transmission and distribution sectors are highly regulated and much less competitive than generation.

== Electricity supply and demand ==
=== Generation ===
Thermal plants fueled by natural gas (CCGT) are the leading source of electricity generation in Argentina. In 2025, Argentina generated 142.3 TWh of electricity. Fossil fuels accounted for 53% of generation, followed by hydropower at 21%, renewables at 19%, and nuclear power at 8%. Installed generation capacity reached 44.2 GW by the end of the year. However, this scenario of gas dominance is likely to undergo changes due to gas exhaustion derived from the existing "bottlenecks" in exploration and production (E+P) and pipeline capacity. Gas output dropped for the first time in 2005 (-1.4%) and gas reserves dropped to ten years of consumption by the end of 2004 (down from an average of 30 years in the 1980s). Today, gas reserves are 43% lower than in 2000. This situation is further aggravated by the uncertainty surrounding the gas deals with Bolivia and the plans to build new regional pipeline connections. Total generation in 2005 was 96.65 TW·h. In 2015, the Atucha II Nuclear Power Plant reached 100% power, increasing the percentage of nuclear power in Argentina from 7% to 10%.

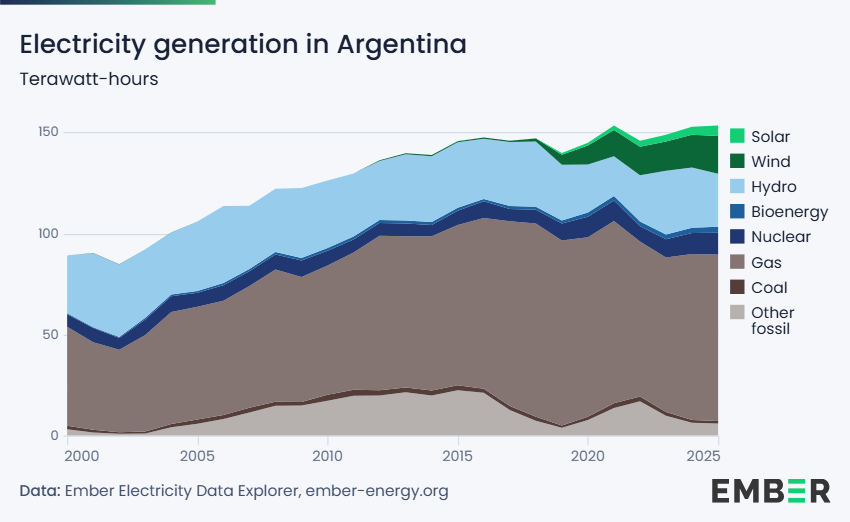
Electricity generation in Argentina in terawatt-hours

The generators are divided into eight regions: Cuyo (CUY), Comahue (COM), Northwest (NOA), Center (CEN), Buenos Aires/Gran Buenos Aires (GBA-BAS), Littoral (LIT), Northeast (NEA) and Patagonia (PAT).

Installed capacity in the wholesale market as of December 2020:

Technology		Installed capacity (MW)	%
Thermal	Combined Cycle	13,120	31.3
Thermal	Gas Turbine	6,298	15.0
Thermal	Steam Turbine	4,254	10.1
Thermal	Diesel engine	1,693	4.0
Thermal	Total Thermal	25,365	60.5
Pumped Storage		974	2.3
Nuclear		1,755	4.2
Renewable	Hydropower	10,370	24.5
Renewable	Onshore wind	2,623	6.3
Renewable	Solar photovoltaic	759	1.8
Renewable	Landfill gas	21.9	0.1
Renewable	Biogases from anaerobic fermentation	28.5	0.1
Renewable	Total Renewable	13,802.4	33.0
Total		41,951	100

The above table does not consider off-grid installed capacity nor distributed generation (small biogas/biomass facilities, rooftop solar panels, etc.)

While CAMESSA categorises hydropower larger than 50MW as non-renewable, the renewable classification of large hydropower is in line with international standards and how other countries classify their hydropower as renewable energy. Pumped storage is considered as non-renewable due to its consumption of electricity from the grid.

=== Imports and exports ===
In 2005, Argentina imported 6.38 TW·h of electricity while it exported 3.49 TW·h. Net energy imports thus were about 3% of consumption.

Argentina also imports electricity from Paraguay, produced by the jointly built Yaciretá Dam. On 18 September 2006 Paraguay agreed to settling its part of the overall debt of $11,000,000,000 owed to Argentina for the construction of Yaciretá by paying in electricity, at the rate of 8,000 GWh per year for 40 years.

=== Demand ===
Electricity demand in Argentina has steadily grown since 1991, with just a temporary decline caused by the economic crisis of 2001-2002 that has been followed by a quick recovery (6%-8% annual increase) in the last five years, partially due to economic recovery. In 2005, the country consumed 94.3 TW·h of electricity, which corresponds to 2,368 kWh per capita. Residential consumption accounted for 29% of the total, while industrial, and commercial and public represented 43% and 26% respectively.

=== Demand and supply projections ===
Argentina currently faces a tight supply/demand scenario as reserve margins have declined from above 30% in 2001 to less than 10%. This fact, together with the deterioration in distribution companies services (i.e. cables, transformers, etc.), has the potential to endanger supply. To sustain a 6-8% annual increase in demand, it is estimated that the system should incorporate about 1,000 MW of generation capacity each year. In 2016, to meet the increasing domestic electricity demand, Argentina imported 9.5 BkWh through electrical transmission interconnections with Brazil, Chile, Paraguay, and Uruguay.

== Transmission and distribution ==
In Argentina, there are two main wide area synchronous grids systems, SADI (Sistema Argentino de Interconexión, Argentine Interconnected System) in the North and center-South of the country, and SIP (Sistema de Interconexión Patagónico, Patagonian Interconnected System) in the South. Both systems are integrated since March 2006. The electricity market in the SADI area is managed by the MEM (Mercado Eléctrico Mayorista).

== Access to electricity ==
Total electricity coverage in Argentina was close to 100% of the population in 2016. However, access to electricity is more deficient in certain rural areas. The Renewable Energy in the Rural Market Project (PERMER) in 2012 was one of several programs being implemented to enlarge electricity coverage in rural areas. (See World Bank projects below).

== Service quality ==
=== Interruption frequency and duration ===
Interruption frequency and duration are considerably below the averages for the LAC region. In 2002 and 2019, the average number of interruptions per subscriber was 5.15, while duration of interruptions per subscriber was around 5 hours. The weighted averages for LAC were 13 interruptions and 14 hours respectively.

=== Distribution and transmission losses ===
Distribution losses in 2005 were 13.6%, down from 17% a decade before. In 2014, losses were about 3.3%.

== Responsibilities in the Electricity Sector ==
=== Policy and regulation ===
The Energy Secretariat (SENER) is responsible for policy setting, while the National Electricity Regulator (ENRE) is the independent entity within the Energy Secretariat responsible for applying the regulatory framework established by Law 26,046 of 1991. ENRE is in charge of regulation and overall supervision of the sector under federal control. Provincial regulators regulate the rest of the utilities. ENRE and the provincial regulators set tariffs and supervise compliance of regulated transmission and distribution entities with safety, quality, technical and environmental standards. CAMMESA (Compañía Administradora del Mercado Mayorista Eléctrico) is the administrator of the wholesale electricity market. Its main functions include the operation and dispatch of generation and price calculation in the spot market, the real-time operation of the electricity system and the administration of the commercial transactions in the electricity market.

The Electric Power Federal Council (CFEE), created in 1960, plays a very important role in the sector as well. It is the administrator of funds that specifically target electricity operations (i.e. National Fund for Electric Power, see Recent developments below) and is also an adviser to the National and the Provincial Governments in issues relating to the power industry, public and private energy services, priorities in the execution of new projects and studies, concessions and authorizations, and electricity tariffs and prices. It is also an adviser for legislative modifications in the power industry.

The Argentine power sector is one of the most competitive and deregulated in South America. However, the fact that the Energy Secretariat has veto power over CAMMESA has the potential to alter the functioning of the competitive market. The functions of generation, transmission, and distribution are open to the private sector, but there are restrictions on cross-ownership between these three functions. Argentine law guarantees access to the grid in order to create a competitive environment and to allow generators to serve customers anywhere in the country.

As lower hydropower increased power price in 2026, government subsidies increased to half the residential rate.

=== Generation ===
Private and state-owned companies carry out generation in a competitive, mostly liberalized electricity market, with 75% of total installed capacity in private hands. The share in public hands corresponds to nuclear generation and to the two bi-national hydropower plants: Yacyretá (Argentina-Paraguay) and Salto Grande (Argentina-Uruguay). The generation sector is highly fragmented with more than ten large companies, all of them providing less than 15% of the system's total capacity. Power generators sell their electricity in the wholesale market operated by the CAMMESA.

=== Transmission and distribution ===
The transmission and distribution sectors are highly regulated and less competitive than generation. In transmission, the Compañía Nacional de Transporte Energético en Alta Tension (Transener) operates the national electricity transmission grid under a long-term agreement with the Argentine government. In the distribution sector, three private companies, Edenor (Empresa Distribuidora y Comercializadora Norte), Edesur (Electricidad Distribuidora Sur) and Edelap (Empresa de Electricidad de la Plata), dominate a market with 75% control by private firms.

Other important distribution companies at the provincial level are:

- Public provincial: EPEC (Empresa Provincial de Energía de Córdoba), EPESFI (Empresa Provincial de Energía de Santa Fé)
- Private provincial: ESJ ( Energía San Juan), EDET (Empresa de Distribución Eléctrica de Tucumán): EDEN (Empresa Distribuidora de Energía Norte), EDEA (Empresa Distribuidora de Energía Atlántica), EDES (Empresa Distribuidora de Energía Sur)

== Renewable energy resources ==
Argentina renewable electricity production by year

The National Promotion Direction (DNPROM) within the Energy Secretariat (SENER) is responsible for the design of programs and actions conducive to the development of renewable energies (through the Renewable Energy Coordination) and energy efficiency (through the Energy Efficiency Coordination) initiatives. Complementarily, the Secretariat for the Environment and Natural Resources (SEMARNAT) is responsible for environmental policy and the preservation of renewable and non-renewable resources.

The most important legal instruments for the promotion of renewable energy are Law 25,019 from 1998 and Law 26,190 from 2007. The 1998 law, known as the "National Wind and Solar Energy Rules", declared wind and solar generation of national interest and introduced a mechanism that established an additional payment per generated kWh which, in 1998, meant a 40% premium over market price. It also granted certain tax exemptions for a period of 15 years from the law's promulgation. The 2007 Law complemented the previous one, declaring of national interest the generation of electricity from any renewable source intended to deliver a public service. This law also set an 8% target for renewable energy consumption in the period of 10 years and mandated the creation of a trust fund whose resources will be allocated to pay a premium for electricity produced from renewable sources.

=== Hydropower ===
At the end of 2021 Argentina was the 21st country in the world in terms of installed hydroelectric power (11.3 GW).

Hydropower capacity 2014-2023 (MW)
2014	2015	2016	2017	2018	2019	2020	2021	2022	2023
11,112	11,114	11,176	11,249	11,294	11,316	11,350	11,351	11,364	11,364

Argentina's hydroelectric potential is being exploited only partially. While the identified potential is 170,000 GW·h/year, in 2006 hydroelectric production amounted just to 42,360 GW·h. There are also untapped mini-hydropower resources, whose potential is estimated at 1.81% of overall electricity production (in contrast with its current 0.88%).

(For a comprehensive list of plants see Hydroelectric power stations in Argentina.)

=== Wind ===
At the end of 2021 Argentina was the 26th country in the world in terms of installed wind energy (3.2 GW).

As of 2020 Argentina had an installed wind energy capacity of 1.6 GW, with 931 MW installed in 2019 alone. Electricity production from onshore wind power in Argentina has increased from 1.41 TWh in 2018 to 9.42 TWh in 2020.

The technical potential for offshore wind in Argentina has been estimated to amount to 2.5 TW, but no offshore turbines have been built so far.

Wind energy capacity 2014-2023 (MW)
2014	2015	2016	2017	2018	2019	2020	2021	2022	2023
188	188	188	228	751	1,609	2,624	3,292	3,310	3,706

The Argentine Patagonia region has a very large wind potential. The Chubut Wind Power Regional Center (CREE) estimated the theoretical potential for the region at 500 GW of electricity generation. However, this large potential is still largely unexploited. One of the reasons for this underdevelopment is that existing tariffs and incentives do not make wind power development attractive enough yet. However, the main deterrent to wind power development in the region has been the lack of transmission lines that connect the Patagonia region with the National Interconnected System. The completion of the Choele-Choel-Puerto Madryn high voltage line, the first section of Línea Patagónica under the framework of the Plan Federal de Transporte de Energía Eléctrica, eliminated this bottleneck in March 2006.

Nevertheless, wind power has increased significantly in Argentina during the last decade. Total operating wind power capacity in 2005 was 26.6 MW, shared by 13 plants. This is still only about 0.05% of the theoretical potential of wind energy in Argentina. In 2007, the distribution of number plants and total capacity was:

- Buenos Aires Province: 6 plants, 6,100 kW
- Chubut Province: 4 plants, 17,460 kW
- Santa Cruz Province: 1 plant, 2,400 kW
- La Pampa Province: 1 plant, 1,800 kW
- Neuquen Province: 1 plant, 400 kW

Of the 13 plants, only three have been commissioned after the year 2000, with the remaining 10 built during the 1990s.

(See Wind power regime map for Argentina).

=== Solar ===
At the end of 2021 Argentina was the 43rd country in the world in terms of installed solar energy (1.0 GW).

Solar energy capacity 2014-2023 (MW)
2014	2015	2016	2017	2018	2019	2020	2021	2022	2023
16	16	16	16	198	447	769	1,080	1,116	1,408

Solar power is only present in remote areas. Just 81 MW·h were generated in 2005, less than 0.1% of total electricity production. In 2012 the first of four 5 MW stages of Cañada Honda was completed, as part of a plan to install 117 MW of renewable energy.

== History of the electricity sector ==
=== The reforms of 1991/92 ===
Prior to 1991, the electricity sector in Argentina was vertically integrated. The sector experienced a serious crisis in the summers of 1988/1989, primarily due to the lack of maintenance of the country's thermal power plants (50% were unavailable). Shortly after the crisis, the government of Carlos Menem introduced a new legal framework for the electricity sector through Law 24,065, which included the following elements: vertical and horizontal unbundling of generation, transmission and distribution; opening up of all segments to the private sector; and separation of the regulatory function from policy setting. As a result of the new law, there was substantial private investment which, together with the public power plants that started production in the 1990s, transformed a situation of power shortage and low quality into one of abundance and reliability at lower prices.

ENRE (Electricity National Regulatory Entity) was created in 1992. The Wholesale Electricity Market (MEM), which covers up to 93% of total demand corresponding to the Argentine Interconnected System (SADI), was also created in 1992. The remaining 7% share of the demand corresponds to Patagonia, which had its own interconnected market, the Patagonian Wholesale Electricity Market MEMSP), now interconnected with the MEM. CAMMESA (Wholesale Electricity Market Administration Company) was also created that year and assigned the responsibilities of coordinating dispatch operations, setting wholesale prices and administrating economic transactions performed through the Argentine Interconnected System.

The reforms implemented in the 1990s led to high investment, which allowed for a 75% increase in generation capacity, resulting in the decrease of prices in the wholesale market from US$40/MW·h in 1992 to US$23/MW·h in 2001. However, the reforms failed to deliver the necessary increase in transmission capacity. Only one relevant project, the addition of the 1,300 km high voltage line between Comahue and Buenos Aires, was built in the 1990s. Distribution networks were also renovated and expanded, which resulted in efficiency and quality improvements.

=== Tariff freeze ===
As a response to the 2001 economic crisis, electricity tariffs were converted to the Argentine peso and frozen in January 2002 through the Public Emergency and Exchange Regime Law. Together with high inflation (see Economy of Argentina) and the devaluation of the peso, many companies in the sector had to deal with high levels of debt in foreign currency under a scenario in which their revenues remained stable while their costs increased. This situation has led to severe underinvestment and unavailability to keep up with an increasing demand, factors that contributed to the 2003-2004 energy crisis. Since 2003, the government has been in the process of introducing modifications that allow for tariff increases. Industrial and commercial consumers' tariffs have already been raised (near 100% in nominal terms and 50% in real terms), but residential tariffs still remain the same.

=== Creation of Enarsa ===
In 2004, President Néstor Kirchner created Energía Argentina Sociedad Anónima (Enarsa), a company managed by the national state of Argentina for the exploitation and commercialization of petroleum and natural gas, but also the generation, transmission and trade of electricity. Through the creation of Enarsa, the state will regain a relevant place in the energy market that was largely privatized during the 1990s.

=== Energy Plus and Gas Plus programs ===
In September 2006, SENER launched the Energy Plus (Energía Plus) program with the objective of increasing generation capacity and meeting the rising demand for electricity. The program applies for consumption levels above those for 2005. CAMMESA requires all large users (above 300 kW) to contract the difference between their current demand and their demand in the year 2005 in the Energy Plus market. In this new de-regulated market, only energy produced from new generation plants will be traded. The aim of the program is twofold. In one hand, it seeks to guarantee supply to residential consumers, public entities, and small and medium enterprises. On the other hand, it aims at encouraging self-generation by the industrial sector and electricity cogeneration.

In March 2008, the government approved Resolution 24/2008, which created a new natural gas market called "Gas Plus" to encourage private investment in natural gas exploration and production. The Gas Plus regime applies to new discoveries and to "tight gas" fields. The price of the new gas, whose commercialization will be restricted to the domestic market, will not be subject to the conditions established in the "Agreement with Natural Gas Producers 2007-2011" but will be based on costs and a reasonable profit. Experts believe that, if the Gas Plus regime is successful, it could stimulate new investments in electricity generation plants under the Energy Plus regime as it could ensure fuel supply to the new plants.

=== The National Program for the Rational and Efficient Use of Energy (PRONUREE) ===
In December 2007, the government launched the National Program for the Rational and Efficient Use of Energy (PRONUREE, Decree 140/2007). This decree declared the rational and efficient use of energy to be in the national interest and is also part of the energy sector strategy to counter supply/demand imbalance. The PRONUREE, under the responsibility of the Secretariat of Energy, aims to be a vehicle for improving energy efficiency in the energy-consuming sectors and acknowledges that energy efficiency needs to be promoted with a long-term commitment and vision. It also acknowledges the connection between energy efficiency and sustainable development, including the reduction of greenhouse gas emissions. The program also recognizes the need for individual behavioral changes to be promoted with an educational strategy, with the public sector setting the example by assuming a leadership role in the implementation of energy conservation measures in its facilities.

The PRONUREE includes short- and long-term measures aimed at improving the energy efficiency in the industrial, commercial, transport, residential and service sectors and public buildings. It also supports educational programs on energy efficiency, enhanced regulations to expand cogeneration activities; labeling of equipment and appliances that use energy; improvements to the energy efficiency regulations; and broader utilization of the Clean Development Mechanism (CDM) to support the development of energy efficiency projects. The objective of the program is to reduce electricity consumption by 6%.

One of the first activities defined under PRONUREE is the national program to phase out incandescent bulbs by 2011 in Argentina. The program, financed by the government, aims to replace incandescent bulbs with energy efficient compact fluorescent lamps (CFLs) in all households connected to the electricity grid and selected public buildings. The program, which has initially undergone a pilot phase and expects to replace 5 million incandescent lamps in the next six months, foresees the distribution of 25 million lamps overall. Staff from the distribution companies will visit each household to replace the incandescent lamps and to inform residential users on the advantages of replacing the bulbs and of the efficient use of energy in general.

=== Recent tariff increases, 2008 ===
In Argentina, retail tariffs for the distribution utilities in the Metropolitan Area of Buenos Aires and La Plata city (i.e. Edenor, Edesur and Edelap) are regulated by the national regulatory agency (ENRE) while provincial utilities are regulated by local regulators. While the utilities under ENRE's jurisdiction had not been allowed to raise residential tariffs since they were frozen in 2002 as a result of the Emergency and Exchange Regime Law, some provincial regulators had recently approved additional charges to residential tariffs. In particular, the Public Service Regulatory Agency in the Province of Córdoba (ERSeP) agreed in February 2008 to a 17.4% additional charge to residential customers. Likewise, Santa Fé approved increases between 10% and 20%; Mendoza between 0 and 5% below 300 kWh and between 10% and 27% above 300 kWh; Jujuy between 22% and 29% and Tucumán between 10% and 24%. Other provinces (i.e. San Juan, Chaco, Formosa, Corrientes, La Pampa, Neuqen, Río Negro and Entre Ríos) are expected to raise tariffs in the near future.

Recently, in August 2008, after a 7-year tariff freeze, residential electricity tariffs in the Buenos Aires metropolitan area (served by the Edenor, Edesur and Edelap utilities) have been increased by 10-30% for households that consume more than 650 kWh every two months. For consumption between 651 kWh and 800 kWh, the increase will be 10%; on the other end, for users over 1,201 kWh, the increase amounts to 30%. The increase impacts around 24% of all Edenor, Edesur and Edelap customers (1,600,000 households). For commercial and industrial users the increase will be 10%.

At the end of August 2008, ENRE also approved increases in transmission tariffs in the 17%-47% range. The increase granted by ENRE was below the increase determined by the Energy Secretariat for some transmission companies (e.g. Transener, Transba, Distrocuyo and Transnoa. Some of them (i.e. Transener, Transba), will most likely challenge ENRE's decision. An overall tariff revision is still pending and has been put off until February 2009.

== Tariffs, cost recovery and subsidies ==
=== Tariffs ===
Electricity tariffs in Argentina are well below the LAC average. In 2004, the average residential tariff was US$0.0380 per kWh, very similar to the average industrial tariff, which was US$0.0386 per kWh in 2003. Weighted averages for LAC were US$0.115 per kWh for residential consumers and US$0.107 per kWh for industrial customers. (See History of the electricity sector for more information on the evolution of tariffs).

=== Subsidies ===
See Fund for the Electric Development of the Interior (FEDEI) below.

== Investment and financing ==
In 1991, the Government of Argentina created the National Fund for Electric Power (FNEE, Fondo Nacional de la Energía Eléctrica), to be funded by a share of the petrol tax and a surcharge on sales from the wholesale market. This Fund, which is administered by CFEE (Electric Power Federal Council), provides funding to the following other funds at the shares indicated:

- 47.4%: Subsidiary Fund for Regional Tariff Compensation to Final Users (FCT), for homogenization of tariffs across the country (this created a de facto subsidy for those consumers in the areas with higher electricity costs)
- 31.6%: Fund for the Electric Development of the Interior (FEDEI), for generation, transmission and rural and urban distribution works. Most funds have been directed to rural electrification
- 19.75%: Fiduciary Fund for Federal Electricity Transmission(FFTEF) (created in 2000), for co-financing or projects in electricity transmission.
- 1.26%: Wind Energy Fund (created in 2002), for the development of wind energy,

In addition, CAMMESA, the administrator of the wholesale electricity market, had projected that by 2007 the country's energy demand would require an additional capacity of 1,600 MW. Faced with the need for specific investments but also with a lack of private investment, the Energy Secretariat (SENER) enacted Resolutions 712 and 826 in 2004, which created FONINVEMEM, the Fund for the Investment Needed to Increase the Supply of Electricity in the Wholesale Market. The Fund, which sought to encourage participation from creditors of the wholesale market, invited those creditors, mainly generation companies, to participate with their credit in the creation of the Fund itself.

=== Ongoing projects ===
There are several projects that are part of the government's response to the predicted electricity shortages. If all those plans are completed as expected, the capacity requirements for the next few years will be met.

==== Thermal power ====
Two new CCGT plants, the José de San Martín Thermoelectric and Manuel Belgrano Thermoelectric, of 830 MW each, are under construction and expected to start full operations at the beginning of 2009. Endesa, Total S.A., AES Corporation, Petrobras, EDF and Duke Energy are the main shareholders in the plants. Both plants, which have been financed through the FONINVEMEM (total investment amounts up to US$1,097 million), are expected to start full operations at the beginning of 2009.

In addition, the Planning Ministry announced in July 2007 the commissioning of five new thermal plants with a total capacity of 1.6 GW and an overall investment of US$3,250 million. These dual-generation turbine (gas or fuel oil) plants, which are expected to start operations in 2008, will be located in Ensenada (540 MW), Necochea (270 MW), Campana (540 MW), Santa Fe (125 MW) and Córdoba (125 MW). Finally, Enarsa has recently launched bidding for eleven small and transportable generation units (15-30 MW each) and for other three larger generation units (50-100 MW) to be installed on barges. These new units, whose base price is still unknown, will add between 400 and 500 MW of new generation capacity.

==== Nuclear power ====
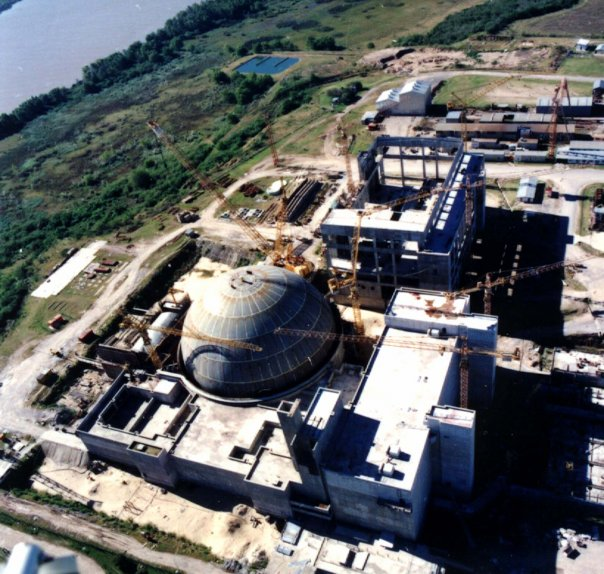
Atucha II Nuclear Power Plant under construction

In 2006, the Argentine government launched a plan to boost nuclear energy. The Atucha II nuclear power plant, whose construction started in 1981, was to be completed and to add 750 MW of generation capacity by 2010. The plant started producing power in June 2014. In addition, the Embalse nuclear power plant, with 648 MW of generation capacity, was to be refurbished to extend its operational life beyond 2011.

Nuclear energy consumption 2011-2021 (Exajoules)
2011	2012	2013	2014	2015	2016	2017	2018	2019	2020	2021
0.06	0.06	0.06	0.05	0.07	0.08	0.06	0.06	0.08	0.10	0.10

==== Hydropower ====
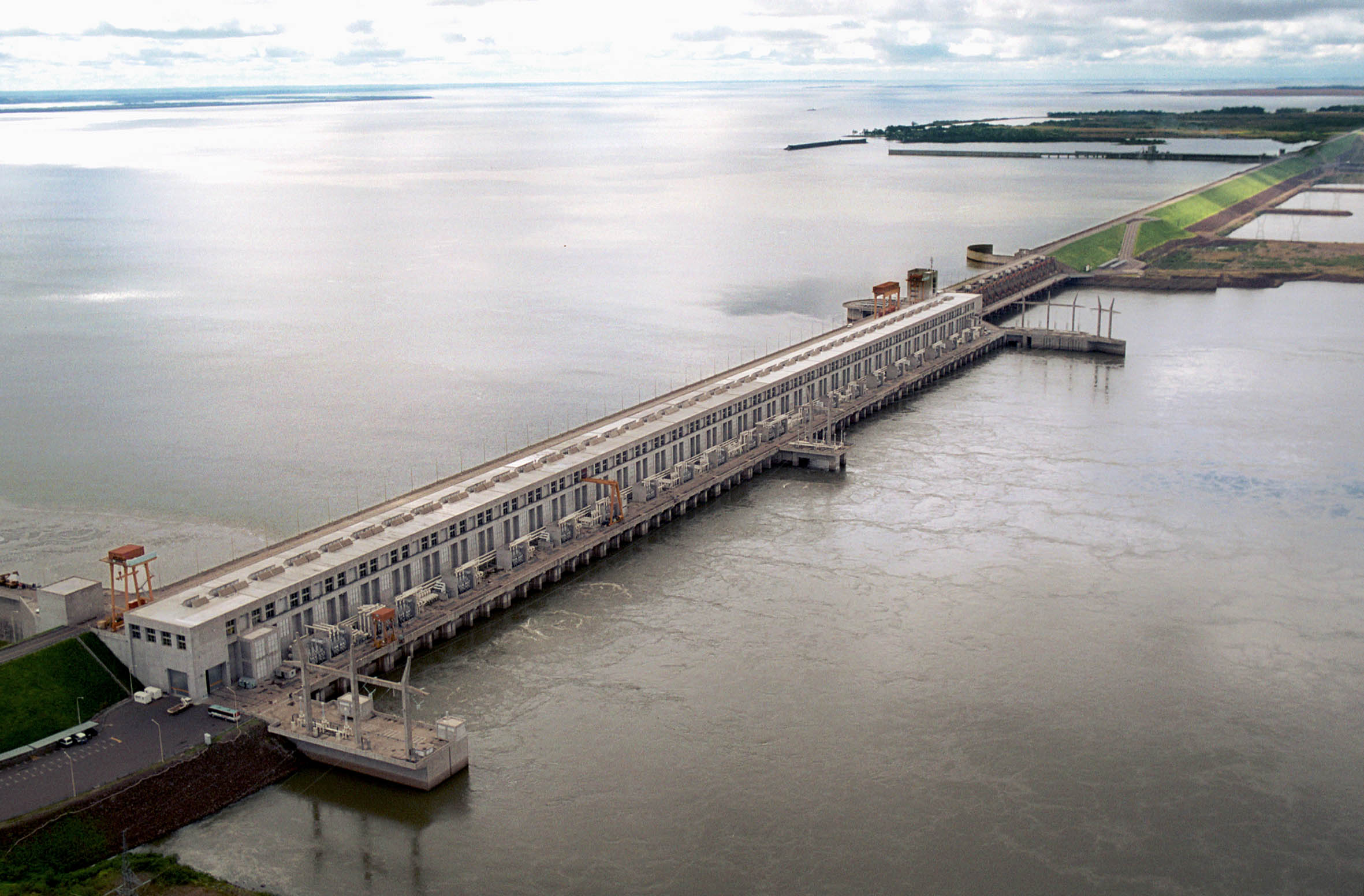
The Yacyretá dam. It is planned to increase its height to increase the electricity generation capacity in Argentina and Paraguay.

On the hydropower side, the Yacyretá dam's reservoir was elevated by 7 m to the height of 83 m as contemplated in its original design, which increased its capacity from 1,700 to 3,100 MW. This will lead to a 60% increase in its electricity output (from 11,450 GW·h to 18,500 GW·h). The reservoir rise was complete in February 2011 despite a serious controversy regarding the resettlement of people. Additionally, in 2006, bidding for the expansion of Yacyretá with the construction of a new 3-turbine plant in the Añá Cuá arm of the Paraná River was announced by the Government. This expansion, to be finalized in 2010, would add 300 MW of new generation capacity.

==== Transmission ====
In regard to transmission, the Federal Plan for Transport of Electric Energy at 500 kV is under implementation under the umbrella of the FFTEF (Fondo Fiduciario para el Transporte Eléctrico Federal). The main lines of the plan (Línea Patagónica, Línea Minera, Yacyretá, Puerto Madryn – Pico Truncado, NEA-NOA, Comahue – Cuyo, Pico Truncado – Río Turbio – Río Gallegos) are already built or currently under construction. The lines built between 2007 and 2009 will add 4,813 new kilometers of high voltage transmission capacity.

In addition, the Federal Plan for Transport of Electric Energy II, defined in 2003 and updated in 2006, has the objective of addressing the constraints faced by the regional transmission networks in the period up to 2010. This complementary plan has prioritized the necessary works according to their ability to address short-term demand issues. 109 of the 240 works identified in 2003 were considered of high priority and have already been completed or are under execution. Initially, investment for high priority works was estimated at US$376 million, while estimated investment for the rest of the works totaled US$882.2 million. However, this budget is under revision due to the increasing costs of materials such as steel and aluminum and of labor.

== Summary of private participation in the electricity sector ==
Prior to 1991, the electricity sector in Argentina was vertically integrated. The new legal framework for the electricity sector included: vertical and horizontal unbundling of generation, transmission and distribution; opening up of all segments to the private sector; and separation of the regulatory function from policy setting.

Currently, private and state-owned companies carry out generation in a completive, mostly liberalized electricity market, with 75% of total installed capacity in private hands. The publicly owned share corresponds to nuclear generation and to the two bi-national hydropower plants: Yacyretá (Argentina-Paraguay) and Salto Grande (Argentina-Uruguay). On the other hand, the transmission and distribution sectors are highly regulated and less competitive than generation. In transmission, the Compañía Nacional de Transporte Energético en Alta Tension (Transener) operates the national electricity transmission grid, while in the distribution sector, three private companies, Edenor (Empresa Distribuidora y Comercializadora Norte), Edesur (Electricidad Distribuidora Sur) and Edelap (Empresa de Electricidad de la Plata), dominate a market with 75% control by private firms.

Activity	Private participation (%)
Generation	75% of installed capacity
Transmission	100%
Distribution	75% of clients

== Electricity and the Environment ==
=== Responsibility for the environment ===
The Secretariat of Environment and Sustainable Development holds responsibility for the environment in Argentina.

=== Greenhouse gas emissions ===
OLADE (Organización Latinoamericana de Energía) estimated that CO_{2} emissions from electricity production in 2003 were 20.5 million tons of CO_{2}, which represents 17% of total emissions for the energy sector. In 2011, according to the International Energy Agency, the actual CO_{2} emissions from electricity generation were 67.32 million metric tons, a share of 36.7% of the countries' total CO_{2} emissions from fuel combustion.

There aren't any commercial-scale facility of Carbon Capture and Storage in Argentina (CCS), but several scientific assessments and government planning documents have identified significant geological potential for CO₂ storage and future deployment in major sedimentary basins such as the Neuquén Basin, Golfo San Jorge Basin, Austral–Magallanes Basin and Cuyo Basin. Research also explores integration of CCS with industrial emitters and natural-gas-fired power generation as a mitigation pathway.

=== CDM projects in electricity ===
As of August 2007, there are only three energy-related registered CDM projects in Argentina, with expected total emissions reductions of 673,650 tons of CO_{2}e per year. Of the three projects, only one is large-scale: the 10.56 MW in the Patagonia region. Production of electricity from biomass waste in the Aceitera General Deheza and methane recovery and electricity generation from the Norte III-B landfill are the two small-scale existing projects.

== External assistance ==
=== World Bank ===
The only active energy project financed by the World Bank in Argentina is the Renewable Energy in the Rural Market Project (PERMER). This project has the objective of guaranteeing access to electricity to 1.8 million people (314,000 households) and to 6,000 public services (schools, hospitals, etc.) located far from electricity distribution centers. Electrification of this dispersed market will be mostly carried out through the installation of solar photovoltaic systems, but also through other technologies such as micro-hydraulic turbines, wind and, eventually, diesel generators. The project, which started in 1999 and is expected to end in December 2008, has received a US$10 million grant from GEF and a US$30 million loan from the World Bank. The Argentine Energy Secretariat has recently presented an Energy Efficiency project to the GEF. The objective of the project is to improve energy use, reducing its costs to consumers and contributing to the sustainability of the energy sector in the long term. A reduction in greenhouse gas emissions is also sought.

=== Inter-American Development Bank ===
In November 2006, the Inter-American Development Bank approved a $580 million loan for the construction of a new 760-mile transmission line in northern Argentina that will connect separate grids in the northeastern and northwestern parts of the country, the Norte Grande Electricity Transmission Program.

=== Andean Development Corporation (CAF) ===
In 2006, Argentina received financing from CAF (Andean Development Corporation) for two electricity projects: the Electricity Interconection Comahue-Cuyo (US$200 million) and the Electricity Interconnection Rincón Santa María-Rodríguez (US$300 million), two of the high voltage transmission lines included in the Federal Transportation Plan. In the same year, Argentina also borrowed US$210 million from CAF for a program that aims at repairing the country's hydroelectric infrastructure.

In June 2007, CAF approved a US$45 million loan to the Buenos Aires province for partial financing of the electricity transport capacity in the North of the province.

== Sources ==
- Cámara Argentina de la Construcción, 2006. La construcción como herramienta del crecimiento continuado. Sector eléctrico. Evaluación de las inversiones necesarias para el sector eléctrico nacional en el mediano plazo. Consultor: Dr. Ing. Alberto del Rosso.
- Coordinación de Energías Renovables, 2006.Potencial de los aprovechamientos energéticos en la República Argentina
- Oxford Analytica, 2006. Argentina: Energy issues threaten sustained growth
- Secretaria de Energía, 2006. Informe del Sector Eléctrico 2005.
- Secretaría de Energía, 2007. Balance Energético Nacional. Avance 2006

== See also ==
- Argentina
- Argentine economic crisis (1999-2002)
- Argentine energy crisis (2004)
- Water supply and sanitation in Argentina
- National Atomic Energy Commission
- Renewable energy by country
- 2019 Argentina and Uruguay blackout
