= Italian Argentines =

Argentine citizens of Italian descent

Italo-argentini (Italian) Italoargentinos (Spanish)
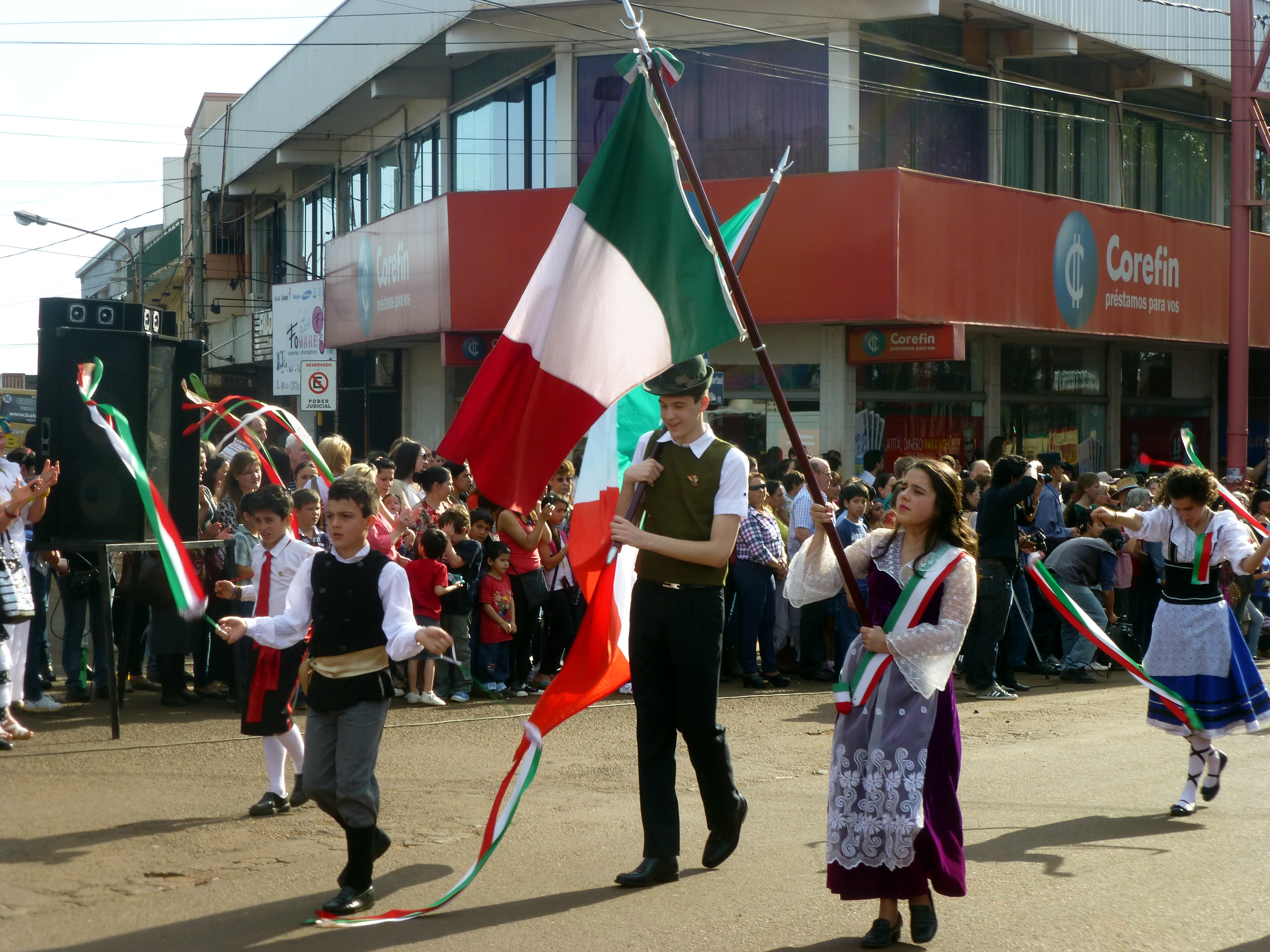
- Italian Argentines during the opening parade of the XXXIV Immigrant's Festival in Oberá, Misiones

Total population
- 84,437 (by birth, 2023) + 25,000,000–30,000,000 (by ancestry); 62.5% of Argentina's population

Regions with significant populations
- Throughout Argentina (Plurality in the Pampas)

Languages
- Argentine Spanish, Rioplatense Spanish, Italian, Piedmontese, Venetian, Neapolitan, Sicilian, Arbërisht and other languages of Italy• Cocoliche pidgin (also Lunfardo slang).

Religion
- Christianity: Catholic Church (Latin Church) (with a small minority of Eastern Catholics of the Byzantine Rite)

Related ethnic groups
- Italians, Italian Americans, Italian Bolivians, Italian Brazilians, Italian Canadians, Italian Chileans, Italian Colombians, Italian Costa Ricans, Italian Cubans, Italian Dominicans, Italian Ecuadorians, Italian Guatemalans, Italian Haitians, Italian Hondurans, Italian Mexicans, Italian Panamanians, Italian Paraguayans, Italian Peruvians, Italian Puerto Ricans, Italian Salvadorans, Italian Uruguayans, Italian Venezuelans

Italian Argentines (Italian: italo-argentini; Spanish: italoargentinos, or tanos in Rioplatense Spanish) are Argentine-born citizens who are fully or partially of Italian descent, whose ancestors were Italians who emigrated to Argentina during the Italian diaspora, or Italian-born people in Argentina.

Between the 1850s and the 1950s, 3.5 million Italians immigrated to Argentina. In 2015, it was estimated that at least 25–30 million Argentines (62.5% of the country's population) have some degree of Italian ancestry. Argentina has the second-largest community of Italians outside of Italy, after Brazil. Contingents of Italian immigrants arrived in Argentina from all regions of Italy, but mainly from Southern Italy in the 20th century.

The Italian community in Argentina, along with Spanish immigrants, became a major part of modern Argentine society. Argentine culture has significant connections to Italian culture in terms of language, customs, and traditions. Argentina is also a strongly Italophilic country as cuisine, fashion and lifestyle has been sharply influenced by Italian immigration. Italian foods such as panettone (pan dulce), pasta, fainá, olive oil, pizza, vermouth and fernet have become part of the Argentine cuisine, and Italian immigrants were one of the influences in the development of the Argentine wine industry.

== History ==
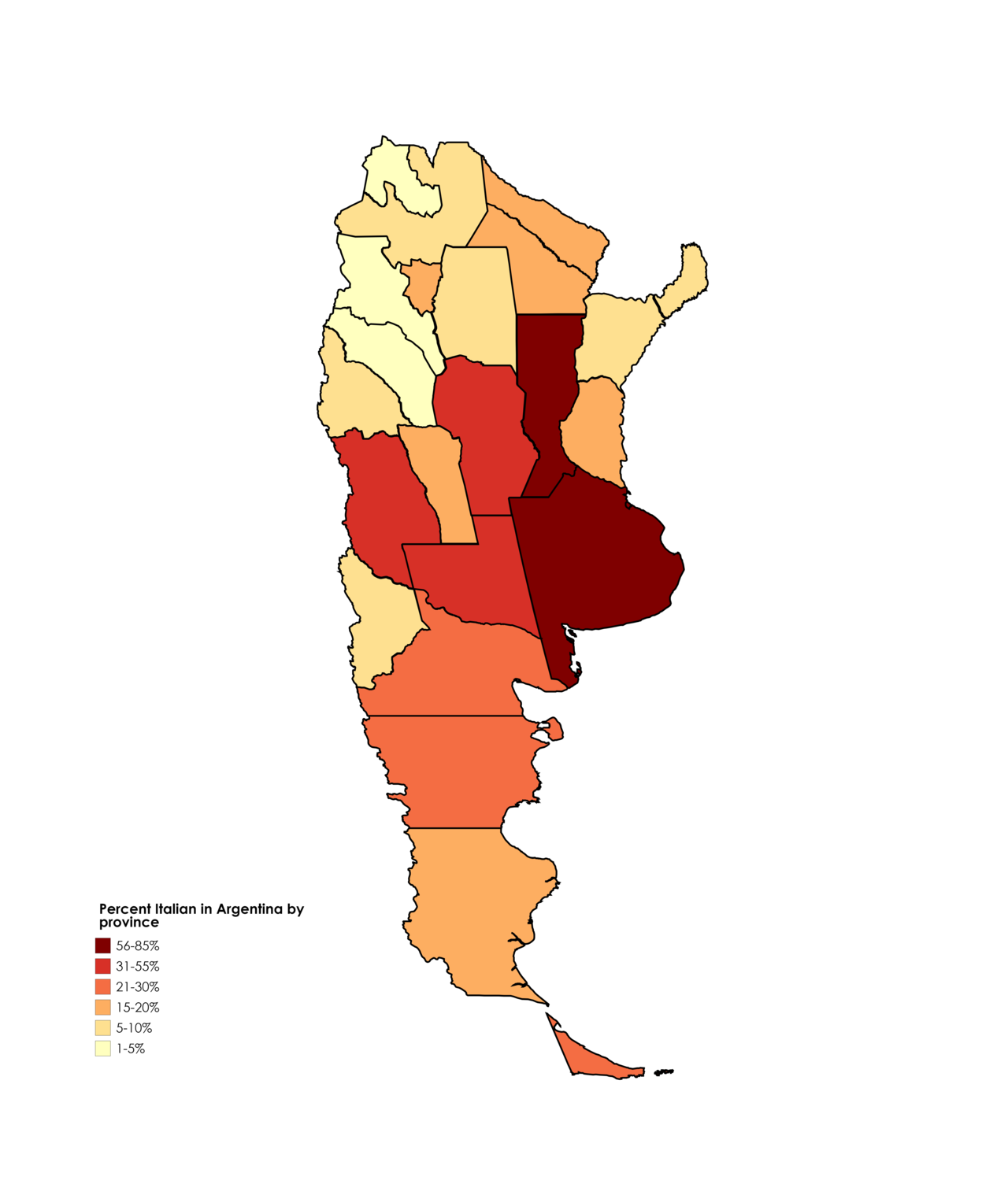
Percent of Italian Argentines in each Argentine Region in 2022

During the Spanish conquest of what would be present-day Argentine territory, an Italian Leonardo Gribeo, from the region of Sardinia, accompanied Pedro de Mendoza to the place where Buenos Aires would be founded. From Cagliari to Spain, to Río de la Plata, then to Buenos Aires, he brought an image of Saint Mary of Good Air, to which the "miracle" of having reached a good place was attributed, giving the founded city its name in Spanish: Buenos Aires (lit. "good airs").

The presence of Italians in the Río de la Plata Basin predates the birth of Argentina. Small groups of Italians began to emigrate to the present-day Argentine territory already in the second half of the 17th century.

There were already Italians in Buenos Aires during the May Revolution, which started the Argentine War of Independence. In particular, Manuel Belgrano, Manuel Alberti and Juan José Castelli, all three of Italian descent, were part of the May Revolution and the Primera Junta. The Italian community had already grown to such an extent that in 1836 the Kingdom of Piedmont-Sardinia sent an ambassador, Baron Picolet d'Hermilion.

However, the stream of Italian immigration to Argentina became a mass phenomenon only from 1880 to 1920, during the Great European immigration wave to Argentina. Over that time period, about two million Italians settled in Argentina, with one million coming from 1900 to 1914. A small number of Italo-Albanians also emigrated to Argentina from Southern Italy. The various waves of Italian immigration influenced the social position of Italians in Argentina. In 1913, the Italian consul in Rosario, Adolfo Rossi, journeyed through the provinces of Santa Fe, Corrientes, and the Chaco. His report painted the image that the first Italian settlers and their sons "were in a paradise, the renters of land in a purgatory, and the lot of the newest immigrants, struggling against debt and privation, was an inferno."

In 1887, Italians accounted for 60.4% of all immigration to Argentina, then there was a decrease as the percentage of Spanish immigration increased. The effect of Italian immigration to Argentina was important for the constitution of Argentine society. In Argentina there are influences of Italian culture that are still evident in modern times. Outside of Italy, Argentina is the country with the highest percentage of Italians, and the one with the greatest examples of Italian culture.

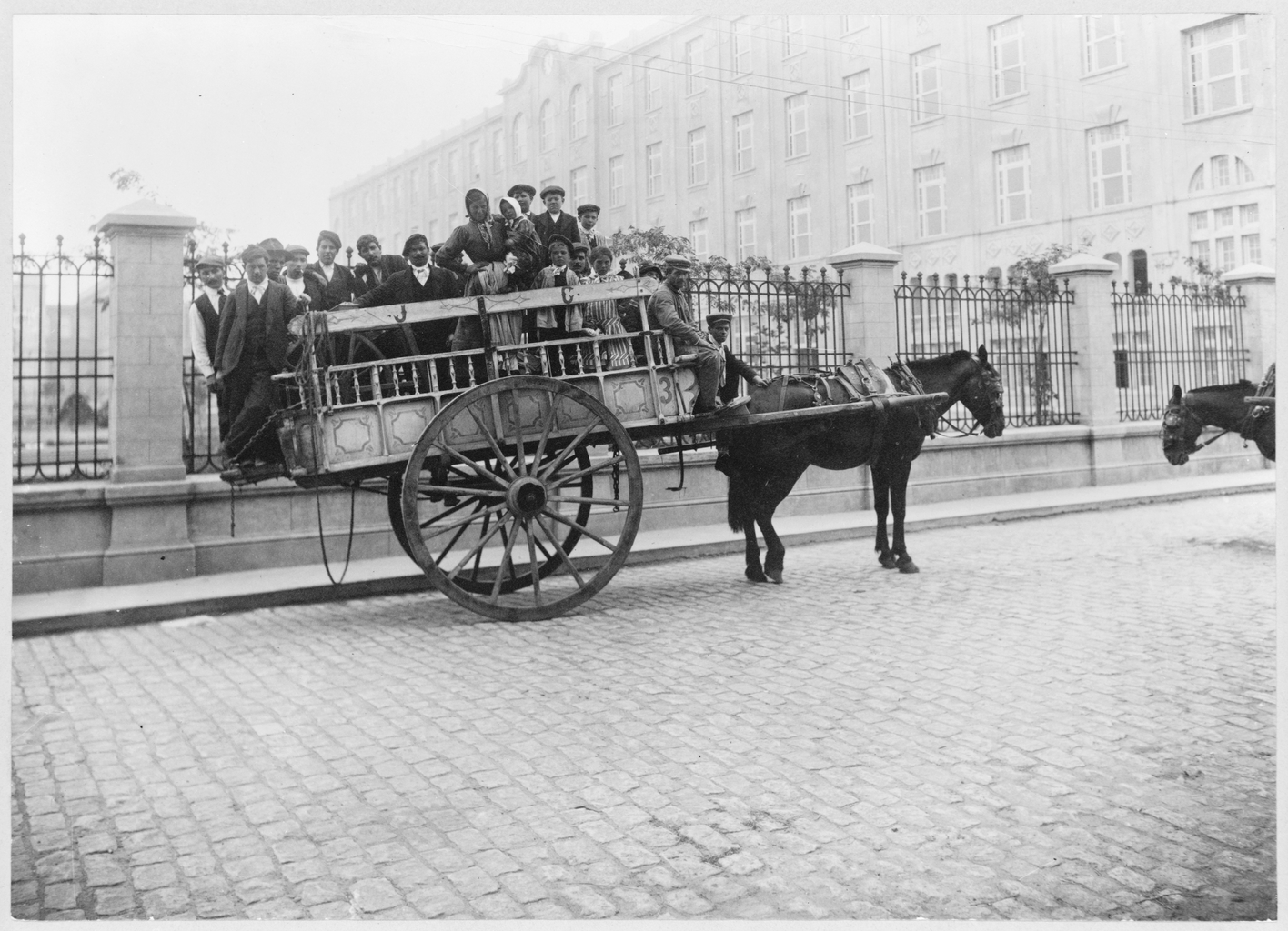
Italian immigrants aboard a cart at the Hotel de Inmigrantes in Buenos Aires

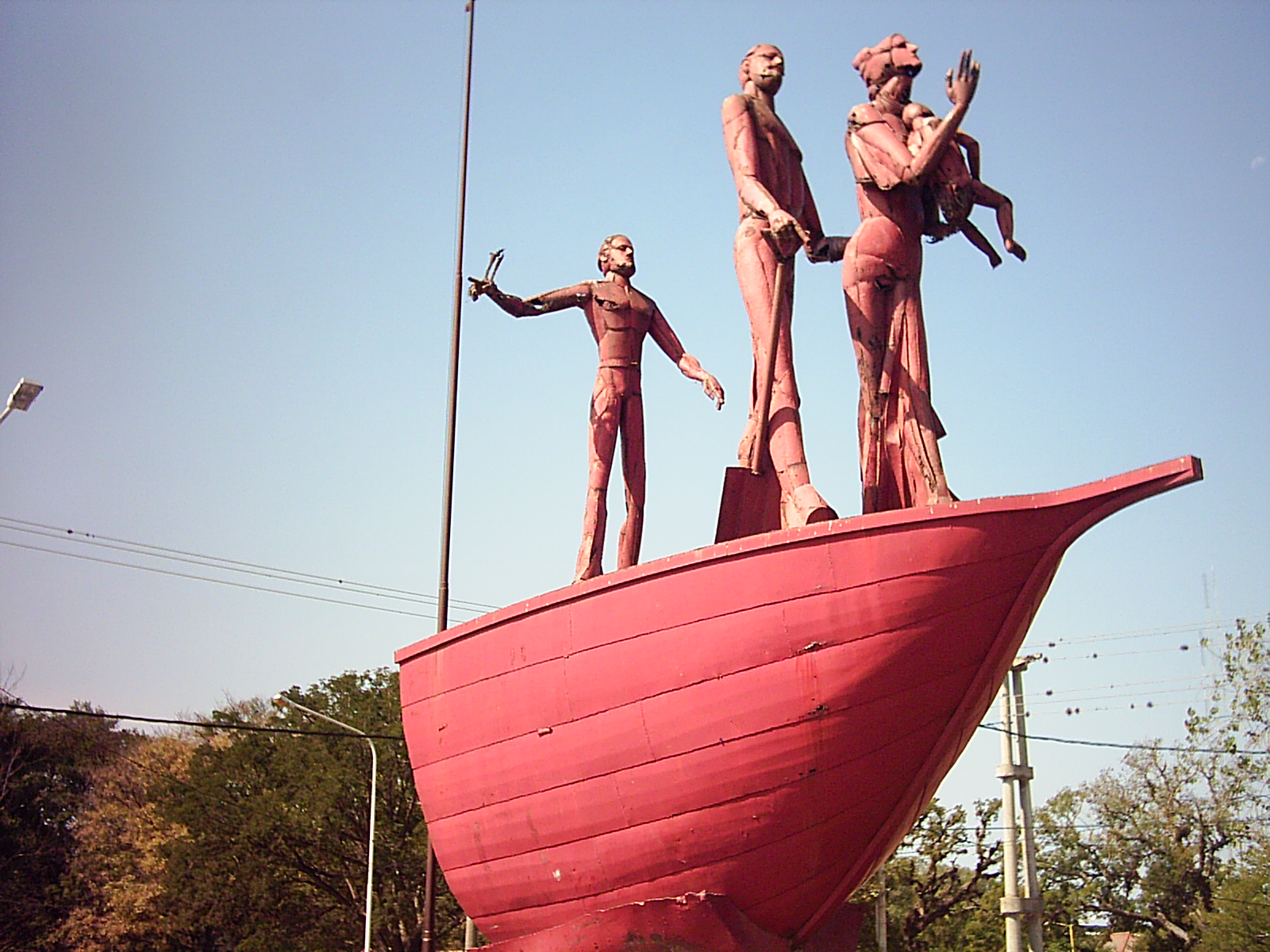
A sculpture symbolizing first Italian immigrants' arrival to Resistencia, Chaco

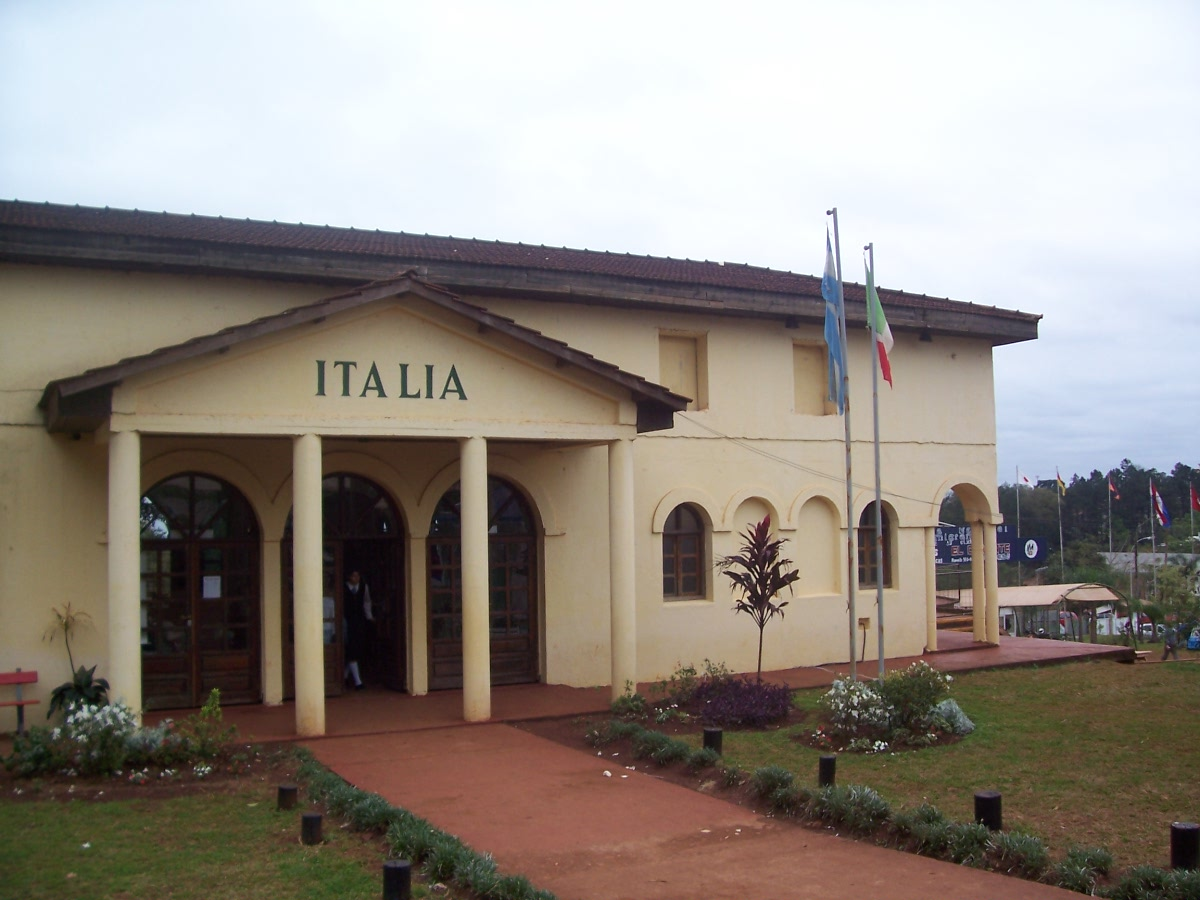
House of the Italian Argentines of Oberá, Misiones

In 1914, Buenos Aires alone had more than 300,000 Italian-born inhabitants, representing 25% of the total population. The Italian immigrants were primarily male, aged between 14 and 50 and more than 50% literate; in terms of occupations, 78.7% in the active population were agricultural workers or unskilled laborers, 10.7% artisans, and only 3.7% worked in commerce or as professionals.

The outbreak of World War I and the rise of fascism in Italy caused a rapid fall in immigration to Argentina, with a slight revival in 1923 to 1927 but eventually stopped during the Great Depression and World War II.

After the end of the war, from 1946 to 1957, another massive wave of Italians moved to Argentina, this time numbering about 380,000. A small number of Istrian Italians and Dalmatian Italians emigrated to Argentina during the Istrian-Dalmatian exodus, leaving their homelands, which were lost to Italy and annexed to Yugoslavia after the Treaty of Peace with Italy, 1947.

In the late 1960s, the Italian economy experienced a period of growth and recovery, removing one of the primary incentives for emigration. As of 2016, 527,570 Italian citizens still lived in Argentina.

In 2024, it was estimated that at least 30 million Argentines (62.5% of the country's population) have some degree of Italian ancestry. Argentina has the second-largest community of Italians outside of Italy, after Brazil. Jorge Luis Borges stated that "the Argentine is an Italian who speaks Spanish", while the Spanish philosopher Julián Marías stated that Argentina could be "the only Italian-Spanish republic on the planet". The Italian economist Marcello De Cecco said: "Italians, as we know, are a people of emigrants. For many centuries they have spread to the four corners of the world. However, they constitute the majority of the population in only two countries: Italy and Argentina."

There are second and third generation Italian Argentines who hold dual citizenship, recognized by both countries. This is because Argentina uses the jus soli principle, which grants nationality to those born in the country, while Italy uses the jus sanguinis principle, which grants citizenship to the children of Italians.

Italians abroad have elected deputies and senators in the Italian Parliament since 2006, when, after a constitutional reform, 12 seats in Chamber of Deputies and six seats in the Senate were assigned to the Italian diaspora. Argentina belongs to the constituency of South America, which corresponds to three deputies and two senators.

== Reasons for Italian immigration to Argentina ==
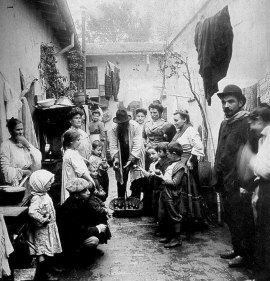
Italian immigrants in a conventillo in Buenos Aires

Between the end of the 19th and the beginning of the 20th century, emigration from Italy was largely due to conditions of widespread poverty, high demographic pressure and heavy taxation, while Argentina was a country with a strong need for immigrants. The welcoming commitment, enshrined in the constitution of 1853, found its reasons in a de facto underpopulated country. The Argentine population, a country whose land area is nine times larger than that of Italy, was only 1.1 million in 1850, and was eager to populate the large regions conquered in the recent War of the Triple Alliance and with the so-called Conquest of the Desert (Patagonia).

Furthermore, a law passed by the Argentine government in 1876 offered the possibility of free land assignments or those payable in installments at very low prices, while in 1882 the government decided to grant 25 hectares of land free of charge to all families. In particular, article 25 of the current Argentine constitution states that:

The federal government will encourage European immigration; will not be able to restrict, limit or impose any tax on the entry into Argentine territory of foreigners whose purpose is to cultivate the land, improve industries, introduce and teach the sciences and the arts

— Article 25 of the Argentine constitution

== Characteristics of Italian immigration to Argentina ==
=== Overview ===
Percentage of Italian-born immigrants in the 1914 Argentine census by provinces and territories

Italian immigrants to Argentina, 1861–1920 (by decade)
Period	Total	Italian	Proportion
1861–1870	159,570	113,554	71%
1871–1880	260,885	152,061	58%
1881–1890	841,122	493,885	59%
1891–1900	648,326	425,693	57%
1901–1910	1,764,103	796,190	45%
1911–1920	1,204,919	347,388	29%
1861–1920	3,798,925	2,270,525	59%

Italian citizens residing in Argentina
Census	Population of foreigners	Population of Italian citizens	% of Italians compared to foreigners	% of Italians compared to the total population
1869	210,330	71,403	33.8	4.9
1895	1,006,838	492,636	48.9	12.5
1914	2,391,171	942,209	39.4	11.9
1947	2,435,927	786,207	32.3	4.9
1960	2,604,447	878,298	33.7	4.4
1970	2,210,400	637,050	29.8	2.7

=== Areas of origin ===
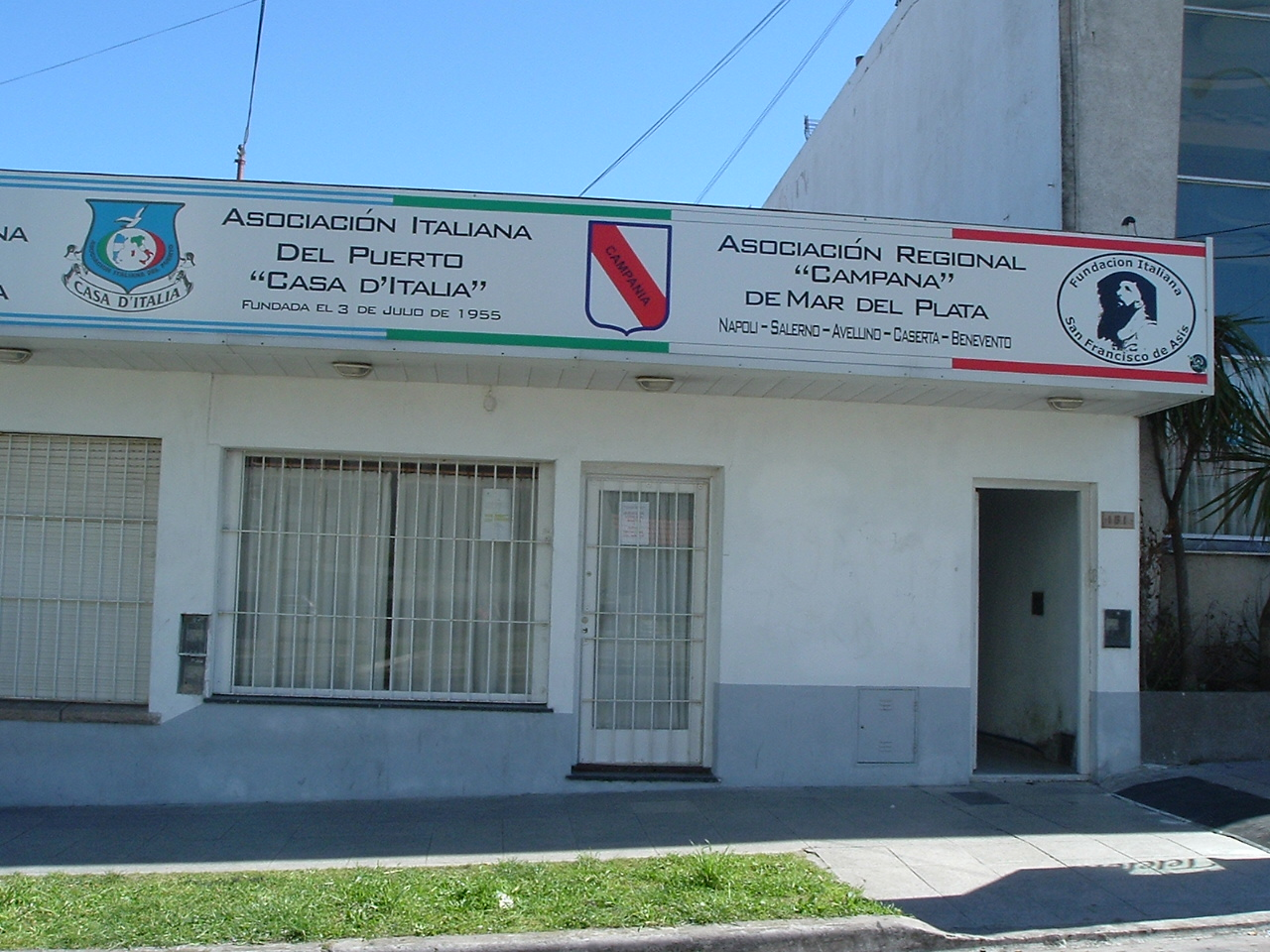
Italian association of Italian-Argentines originally from the Campania region in Mar del Plata

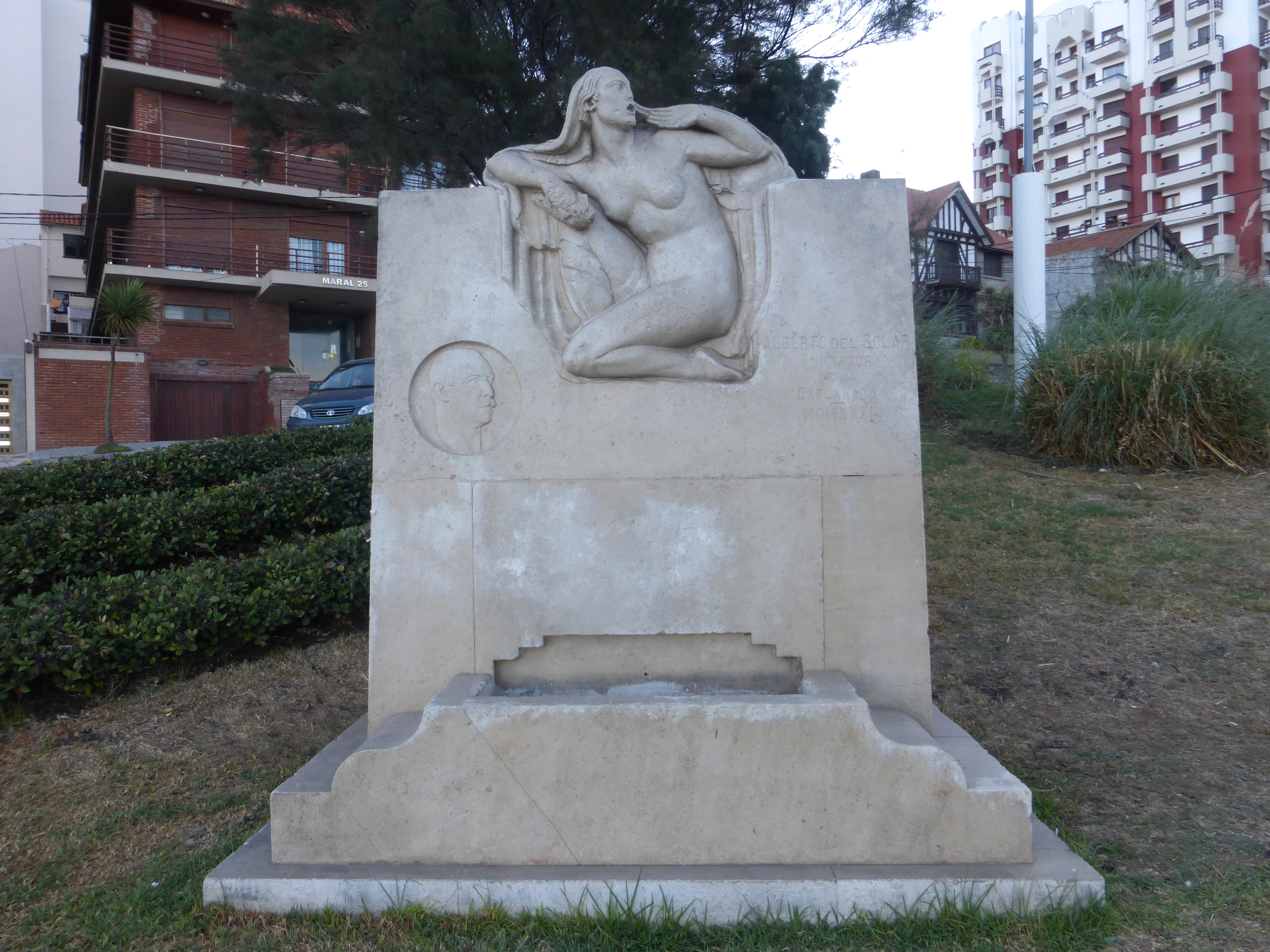
Allegory of the Italian Argentines of Molise region origin in Mar del Plata

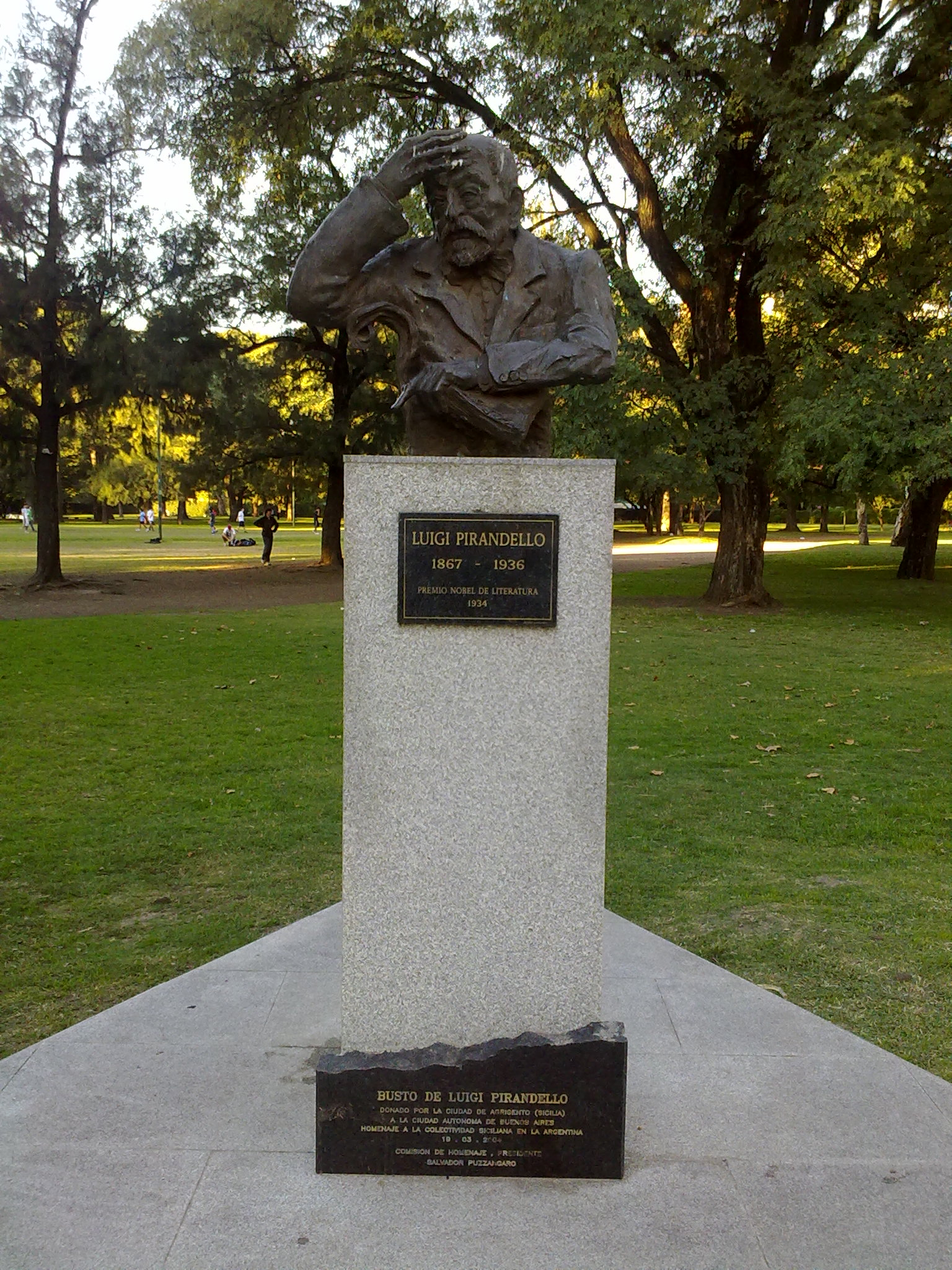
Monument to Luigi Pirandello, a gift of the Italian city of Agrigento (Sicily) to the Argentine city of Buenos Aires and tribute to the Sicilian community in Argentina

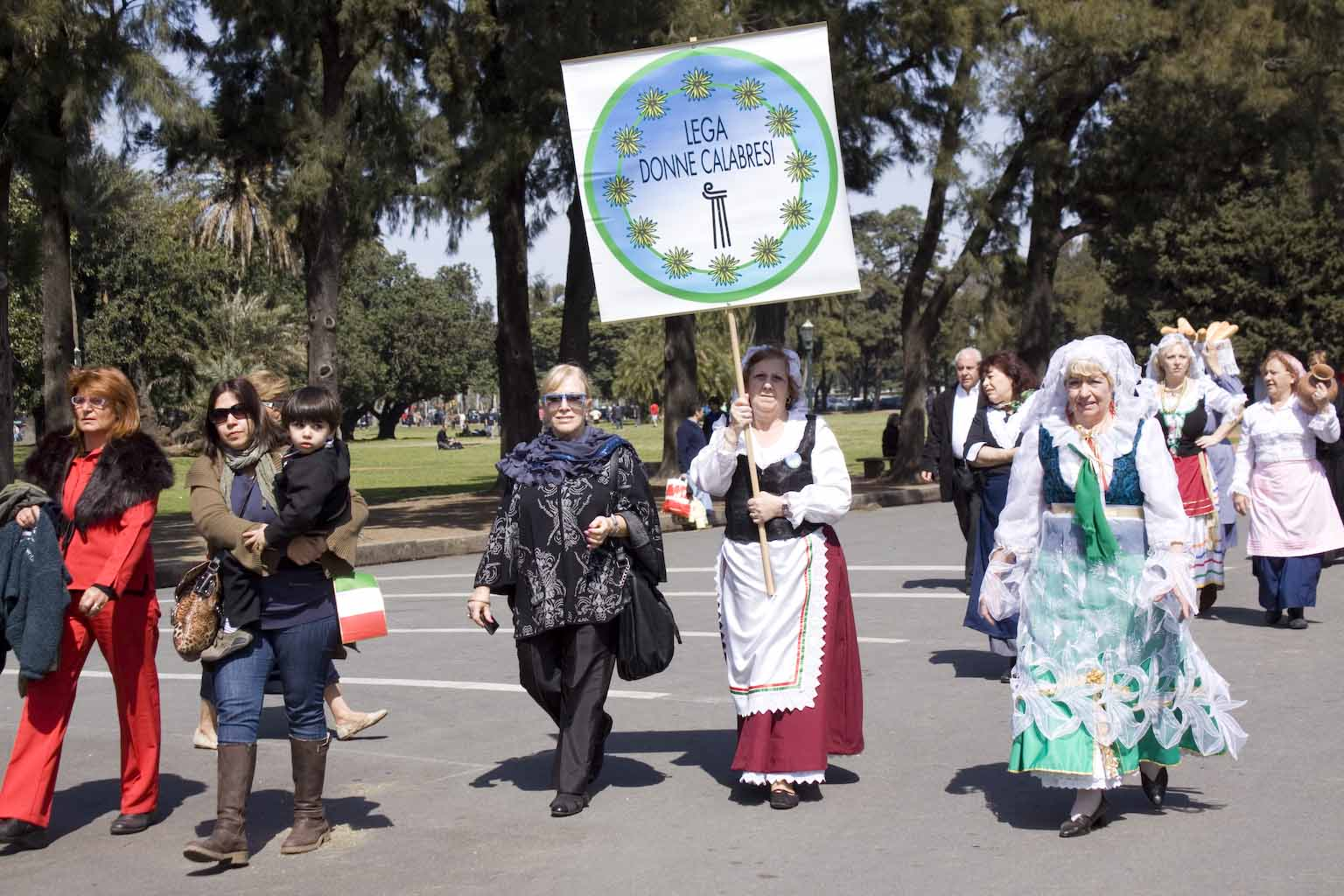
Women of the Calabrian community of Buenos Aires

Italian immigrants arrived in Argentina from all regions of Italy, mainly from Northern Italy in the 19th century, and mostly from Southern Italy in the 20th century. Most of the Italians who initially moved to Argentina were farmers from the north, originating from regions such as Piedmont, Liguria, Veneto, Friuli-Venezia Giulia and Lombardy. Due to the nascent industrialization of Northern Italy in the 20th century, immigration patterns shifted to rural Southern Italy, especially Campania, Calabria and Sicily. Immigrants from northern Italy settled mainly in rural areas, while those from the south preferred large cities.

Of the 2,386,181 Italians who arrived in Argentina between 1876 and 1930, 47% (1,116,369) came from Southern Italy, 41% (988,235) from Northern Italy and 12% from Central Italy (281,577). The Italian regions from which most of the immigrants came were Piedmont (in the north) and Calabria (in the south). Calabrian immigrants have always arrived in large numbers and their migration has not changed much over time. Immigrants from Sicily began to arrive in large numbers from 1895 to the early 1900s, and by 1914, one in six immigrants were Sicilian.

In the 1950s, more than 65% of Italian immigrants came from the south, with 30% from Calabria, 15% from Campania and 12% from Sicily. Of the remaining 35%, 21% came from central-southern regions, in particular Abruzzo and Molise (in this case 14%), while 13% came from the north, mainly from Veneto and Friuli-Venezia Giulia.

Of the immigrants who arrived between 1876 and 1915, 16.9% were from Piedmont, 13.2% from Calabria, 11.1% from Sicily, 10.4% from Lombardy, 8.2% from Marche, 7.5% from Campania, 7.2% from Veneto and 3.2% from Abruzzo and Molise, which then constituted a single region. Tuscany, Umbria, Lazio and Emilia-Romagna, in central Italy, were the regions that contributed the least to immigration to Argentina.

In Argentine slang, tano (from Napulitano, "Neapolitan") is still used for all people of Italian descent although it originally meant inhabitants of the former independent state the Kingdom of Naples. The assumption that emigration from cities was negligible has an important exception. Naples went from being the capital of its own kingdom in 1860 to being just another large city in Italy. The loss of bureaucratic jobs and the subsequently declining financial situation led to high unemployment. This caused a massive departure from Naples and southern Italy to Argentina.

According to a 1990 study, the high proportion of returnees can show a positive or negative correlation between regions of origin and of destination. Southern Italians indicate a more permanent settlement. Argentine society's Italian component is the result of Southern rather than Northern influences.

Italian immigrants arriving in Argentina and regional distribution
Period	Northwest Italy	Northeastern and central Italy	Southern and insular Italy	Total
1880–1884	59.8%	16.8%	23.4%	106,953
1885–1889	45.3%	24.4%	30.3%	259,858
1890–1894	44.2%	20.7%	35.1%	151,249
1895–1899	32.3%	23.1%	44.6%	211,878
1900–1904	29.2%	19.6%	51.2%	232,746
1905–1909	26.9%	20.1%	53.0%	437,526
1910–1914	27.4%	18.2%	54.4%	355,913
1915–1919	32.3%	23.1%	44.6%	26,880
1920–1924	19.7%	27.4%	52.9%	306,928
1925–1929	14.4%	33.1%	52.5%	235,065

=== Religion ===
Italian Argentines are predominantly Catholics of the Latin Church. A group of Italian-Albanians, belonging to the Italo-Albanian Catholic Church and worshipping according to the Byzantine Rite, are present in Luis Guillón, in the Esteban Echeverría Partido in the Buenos Aires Province.

=== Settlement areas ===
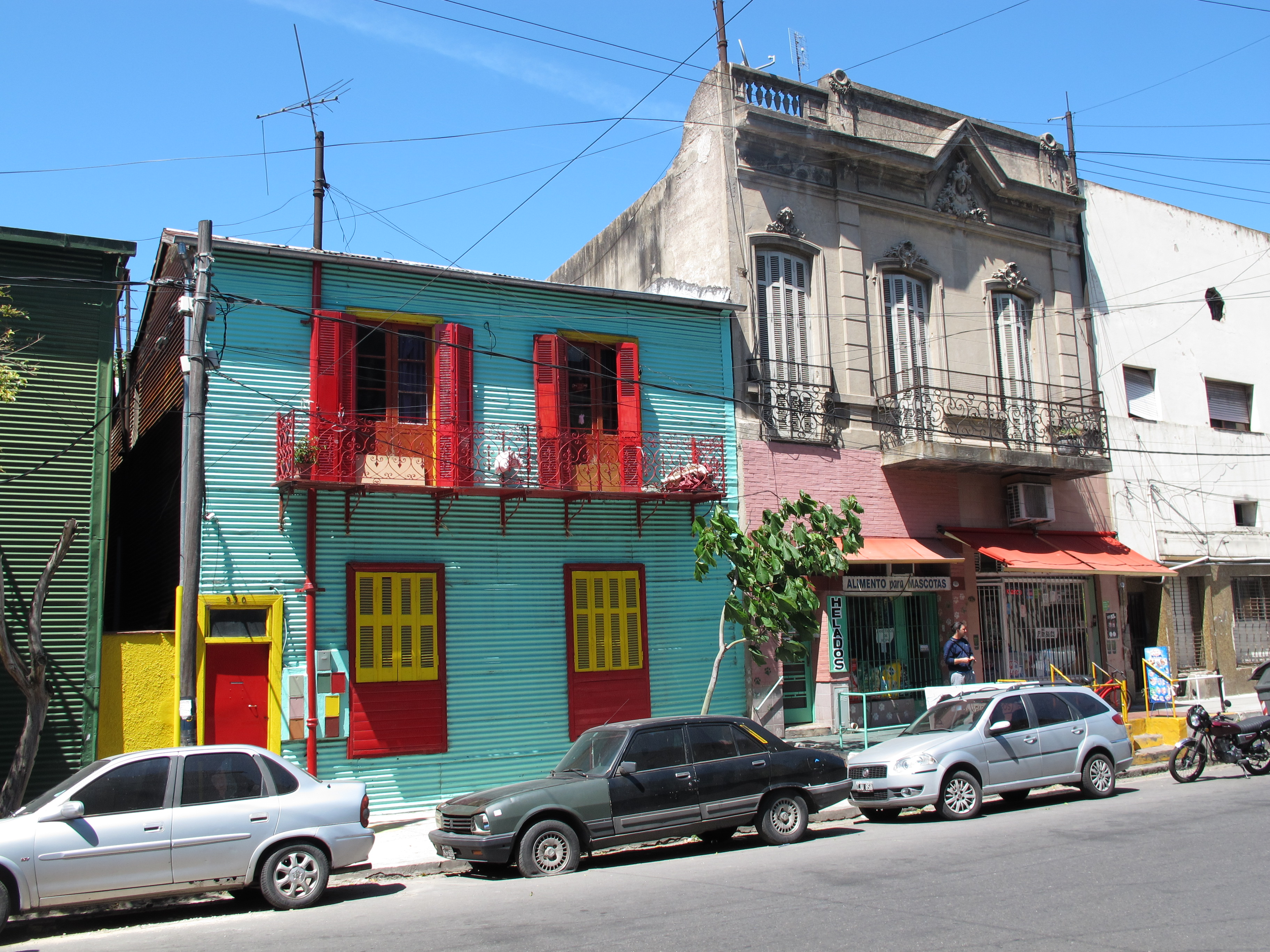
Buenos Aires district of La Boca, settlement of the Genoese

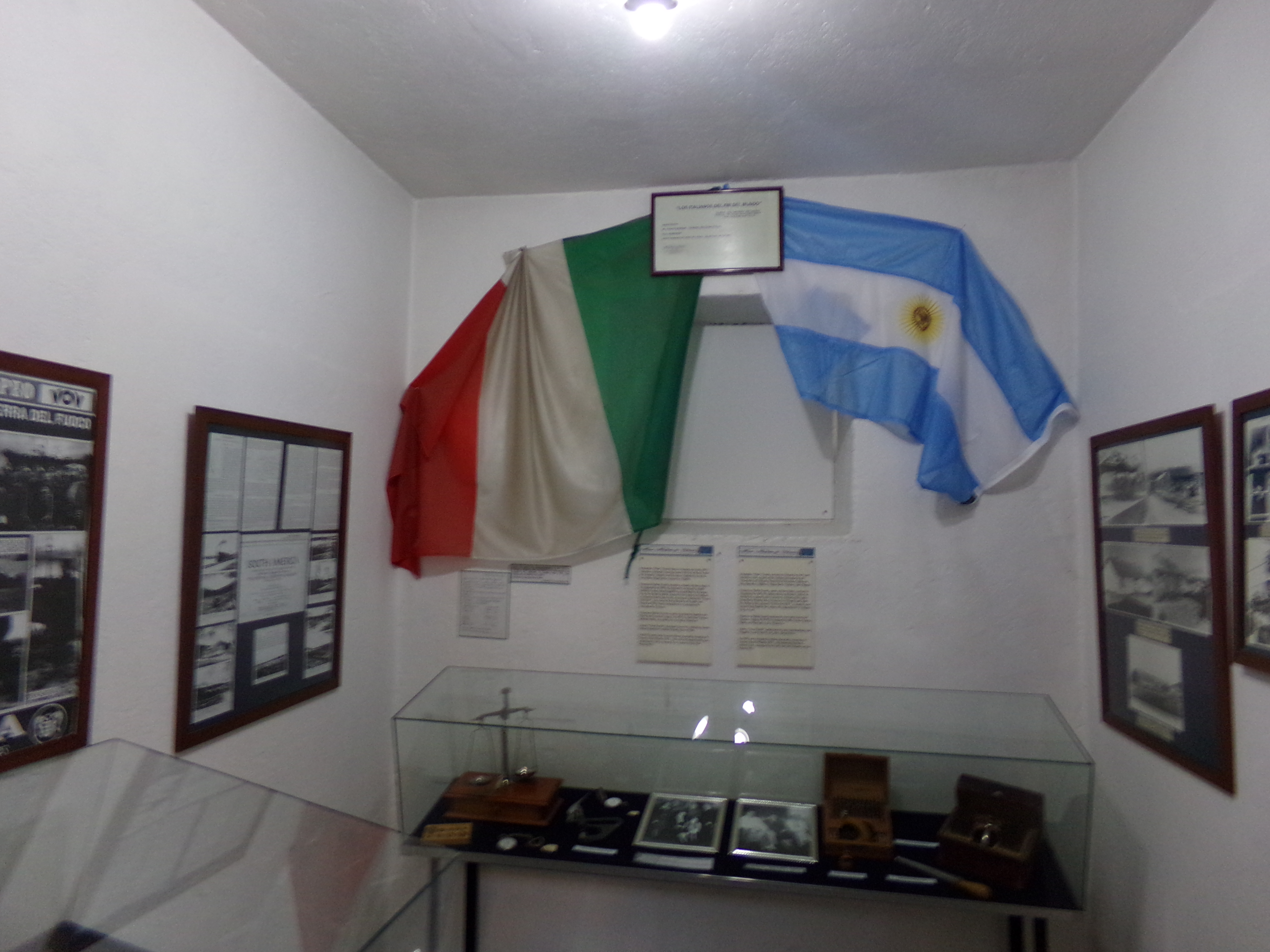
Space dedicated to the Italian Argentines of Tierra del Fuego in the Maritime Museum of Ushuaia

Most of the Italian immigrant community settled in the Buenos Aires Province, especially in the city of Buenos Aires, as well as in the provinces of Santa Fe, Entre Ríos, Córdoba, La Pampa, Tucumán, Santiago del Estero and Corrientes.

For example, in Rosario, Santa Fe, the descendants of Italians are almost 65% of the total of the city. Italian immigration to Argentina was markedly urban, with the exception of the province of Santa Fe, where agricultural colonies predominated.

In 1895, 181,361 of the 663,864 inhabitants of the city of Buenos Aires were Italians. The main settlement was the La Boca district of Buenos Aires, where Italians represented 80% of the merchants and 70% of the employees. At the same time there were 13 Italian-language newspapers.

In 1914, Buenos Aires had more than 300,000 inhabitants born in Italy, which represented 25% of the total population of the capital and 60% of the Italian immigration in all of Argentina. There, the Italian community was integrated into Buenos Aires society through institutions, schools, churches, newspapers and political groups.

In La Plata at the end of the 19th century there were almost 4,600 Italian emigrants in a city of just 10,000 inhabitants. Immigrants from northern Italy settled in highly populated regions of the country such as the provinces of Santa Fe, Córdoba and Mendoza, where they found better job opportunities.

The capital of Chaco Province, Resistencia, was the destination of many Italians after 1878. Patagonia was a minor destination. However, the city of Ushuaia, capital of the Tierra del Fuego Province, received a substantial influx of Italians between 1948 and 1949.

=== Subsidized immigration ===
Subsidized immigration has never been relevant, although agricultural colonies have been established in central and northeastern Argentina. The first was in the Corrientes Province in 1853, establishing the way for companies to advance the travel expenses of immigrants and the expenses necessary to start the business in the allotted lots. According to the 1895 census, out of a total of 407,503 subsistence peasants, more than a quarter were of foreign nationality, and of these 62,975 were Italians, of which the largest community was from Calabria.

=== Italian-born in Argentina in 2010 ===
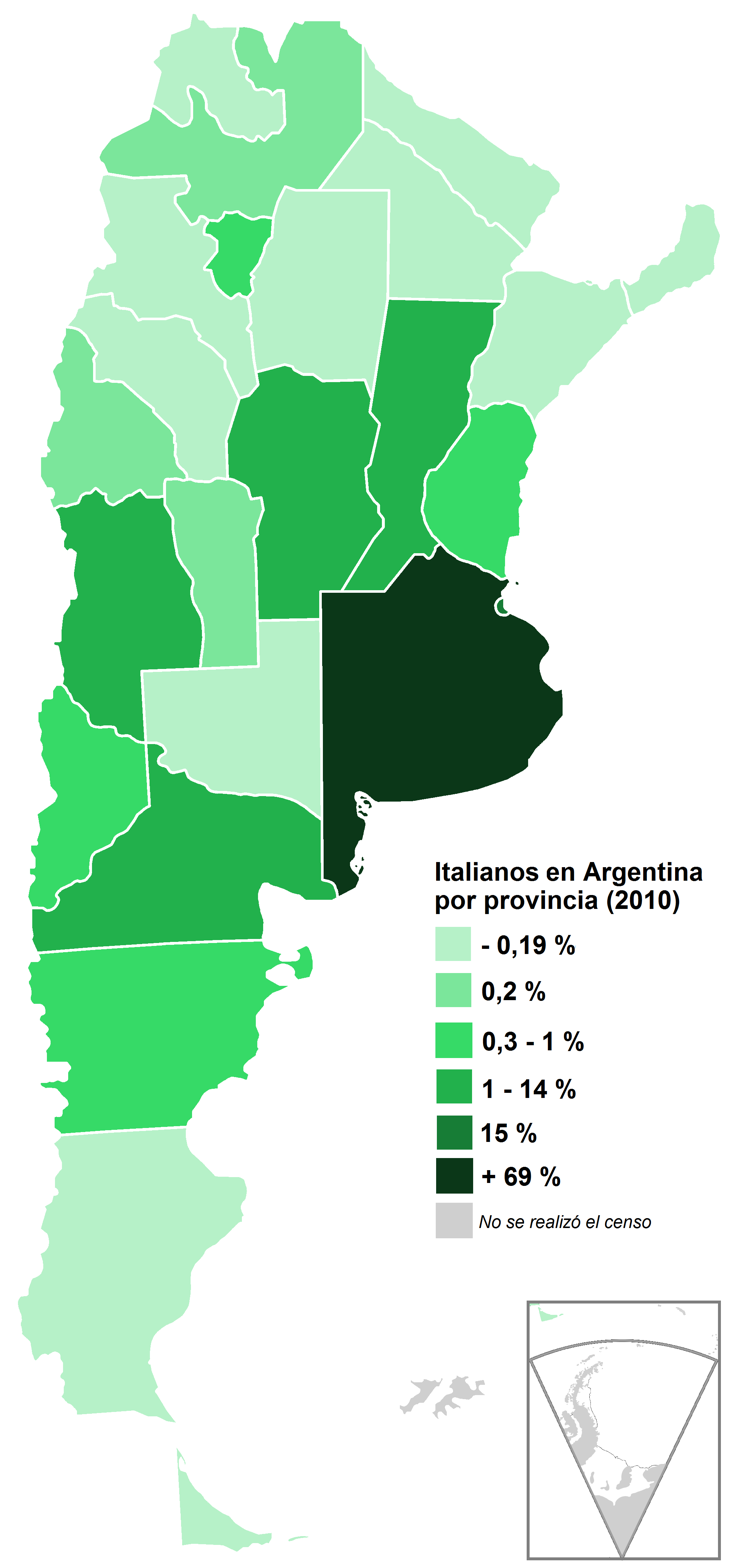
Percentage of Italian-born in Argentina by province according to the 2010 census

The 2010 Argentine census recorded 147,499 people born in Italy. According to the 2010 Argentine census, out of a total of 147,499 people born in Italy, 65,021 were men and 82,478 were women. Out of the total number of men, 966 were between 0 and 14 years old, 20,226 between 15 and 64 years old and 43,829 were over 65 years old. Of the total number of women, 1,011 were between 0 and 14 years of age, 21,597 between 15 and 64 years of age and 59,870 were over 65 years of age. The following table shows the distribution in the 23 provinces and in the Autonomous City of Buenos Aires:

Rank	Province	Born in Italy	%
1	Buenos Aires Province	102,037	69.17%
2	Buenos Aires (CABA)	22,168	15.00%
3	Santa Fe	7,875	5.34%
4	Córdoba	4,894	3.31%
5	Mendoza	3,786	2.50%
6	Río Negro (Argentina)	1,573	1.07%
7	Chubut	601	0.40%
8	Neuquén	546	0.37%
9	Entre Ríos	507	0.34%
10	Tucumán	504	0.34%
11	Salta	424	0.29%
12	San Juan	419	0.28%
13	San Luis	375	0.25%
14	Santa Cruz	223	0.15%
15	Misiones	219	0.15%
16	Corrientes	208	0.14%
17	Santiago del Estero	199	0.13%
18	Chaco	191	0.13%
19	La Pampa	180	0.12%
20	Jujuy	145	0.10%
21	Tierra del Fuego	136	0.09%
22	Catamarca	109	0.07%
	La Rioja (Argentina)	109	0.07%
24	Formosa	71	0.05%
Total	Argentina	147,499	100%

== Discrimination ==
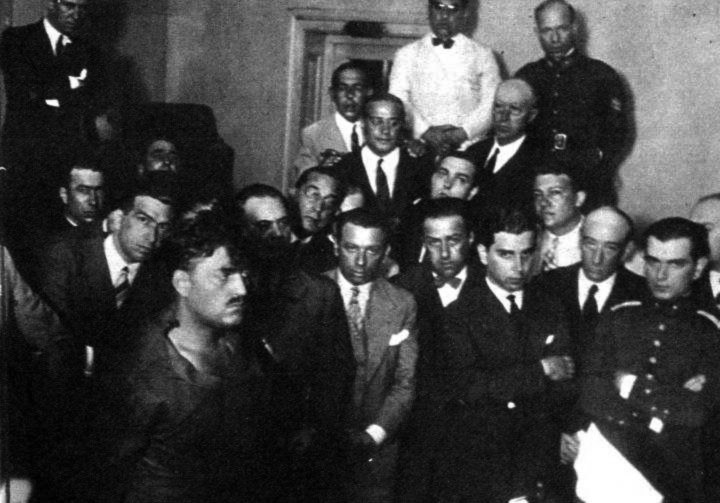
Severino Di Giovanni (on the left) in court

Compared to the experience of Italians in other parts of the world, such as in the United States, Italian Argentines did not suffer from anti-Catholic or racist sentiments. Catholic societies in Argentina welcomed new settlers of the same faith, who could help shape the country.

Despite this, there were extreme cases in which Italian Argentines suffered xenophobia, such as during the Yellow Fever epidemic of 1871, which was blamed on the Italian immigrants and their poor living conditions and in the 1931 trial against anarchist Severino Di Giovanni. Di Giovanni's trial aroused some anti-Italian sentiments, motivated above all by the fear of attacks on the Argentine state by Italian anarchists. Between the end of the 19th century and the beginning of the 20th century, the bourgeoisie of Spanish origin initially looked at the large number of Italians with an evil eye, fearing for the social ascent of the following generations, thus asking for the intervention of Argentine national culture. The main concern was aimed at anarchists and socialists, for whom repressive laws were passed in 1902 and 1910.

== Culture ==
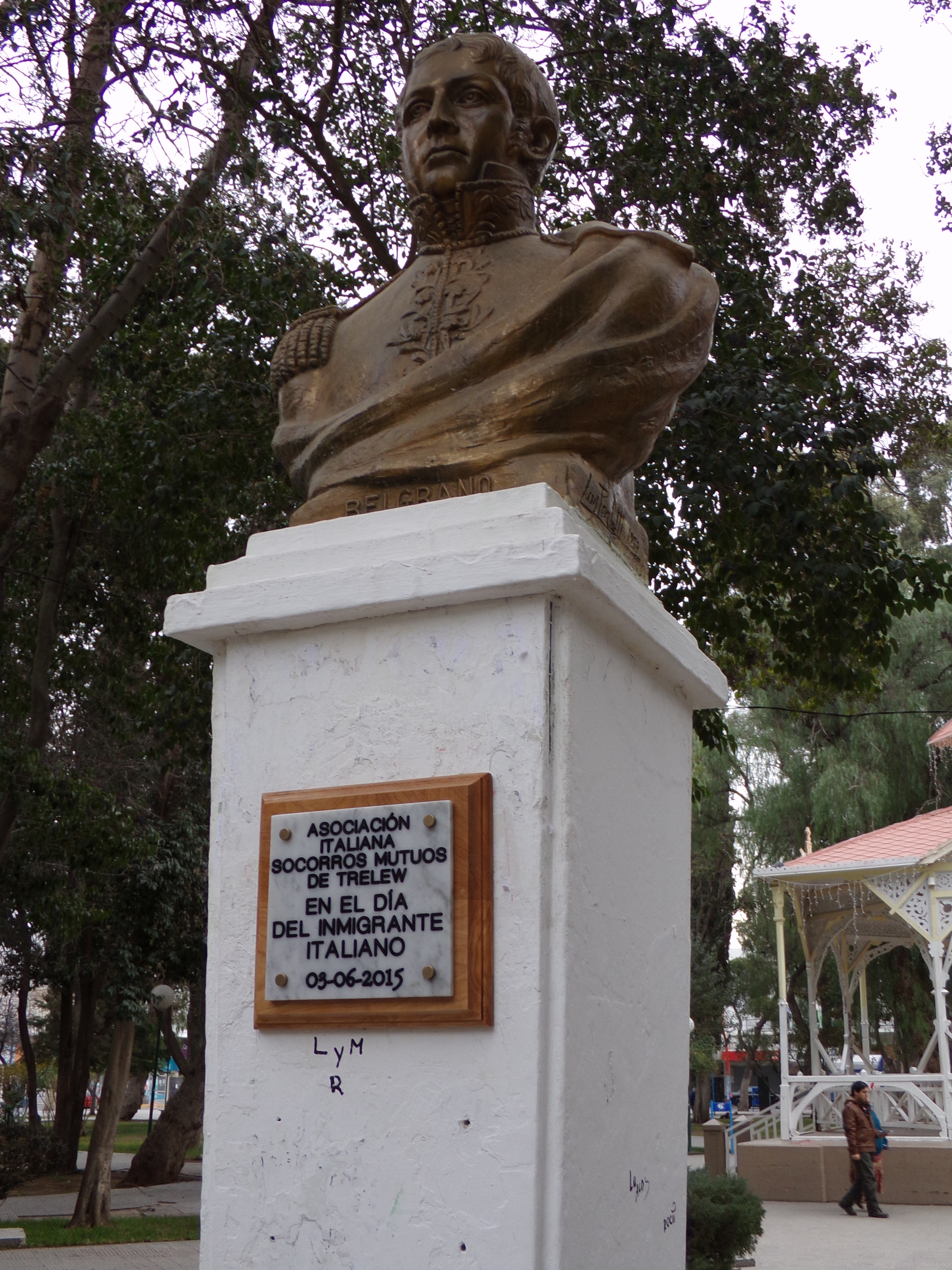
Monument to Manuel Belgrano in Trelew, Chubut Province, with a plaque commemorating the "Italian Immigrant Day". Manuel Belgrano was the politician and military leader who created the Flag of Argentina. His father was Italian.

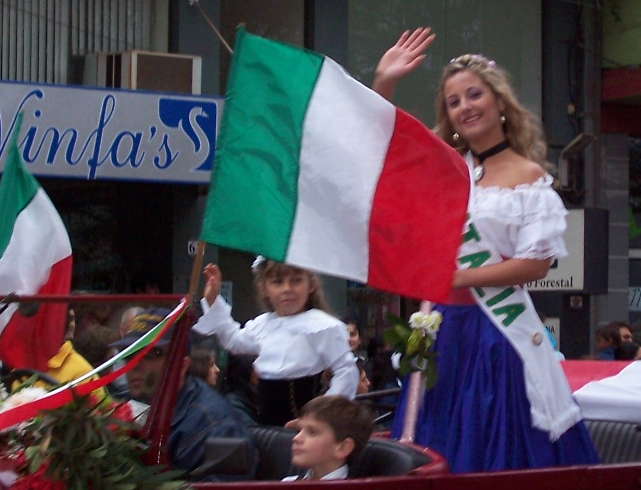
Italian festival in Oberá

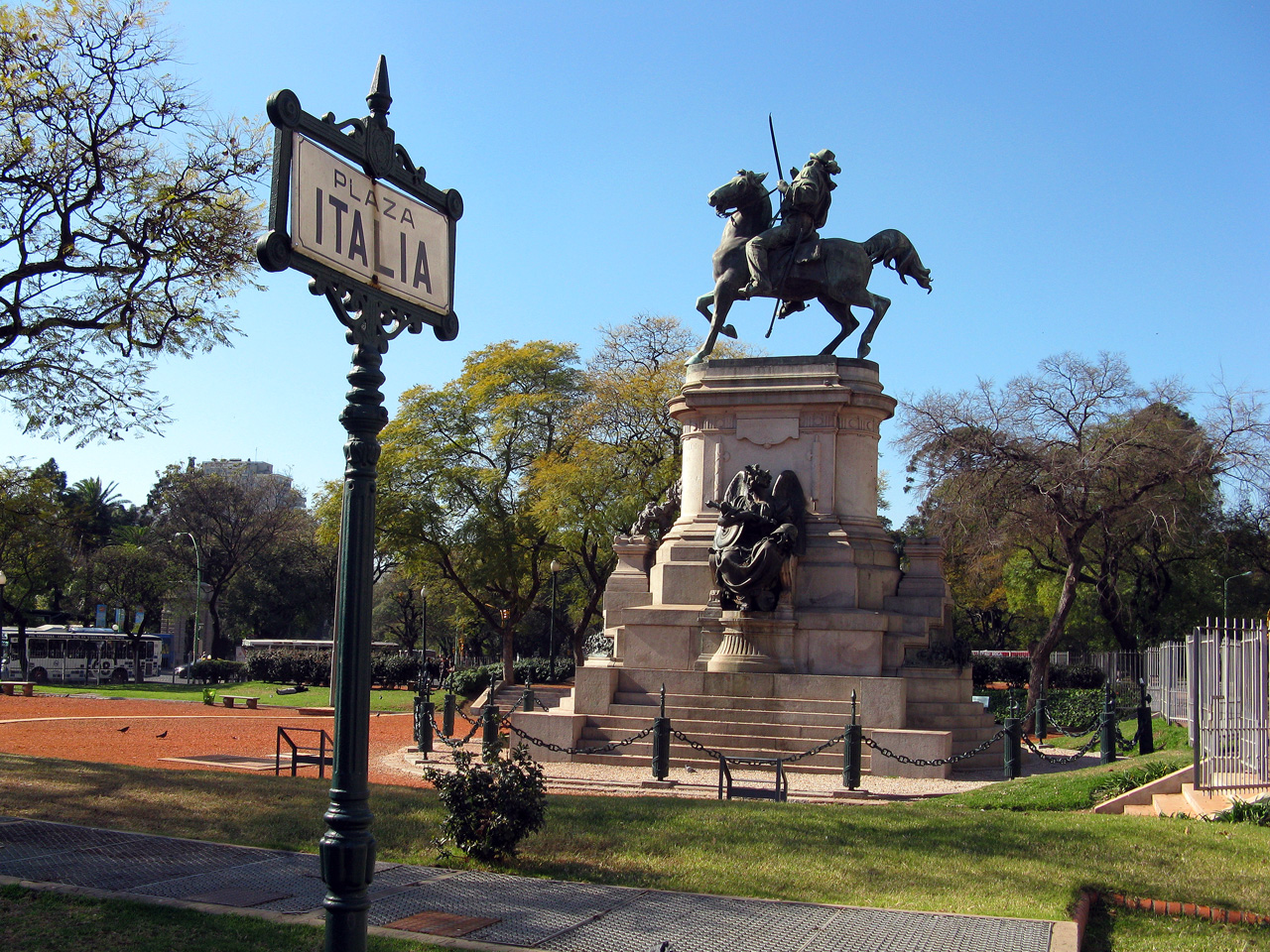
Monument to Giuseppe Garibaldi, located on Plaza Italia, a landmark in the Palermo neighbourhood of Buenos Aires

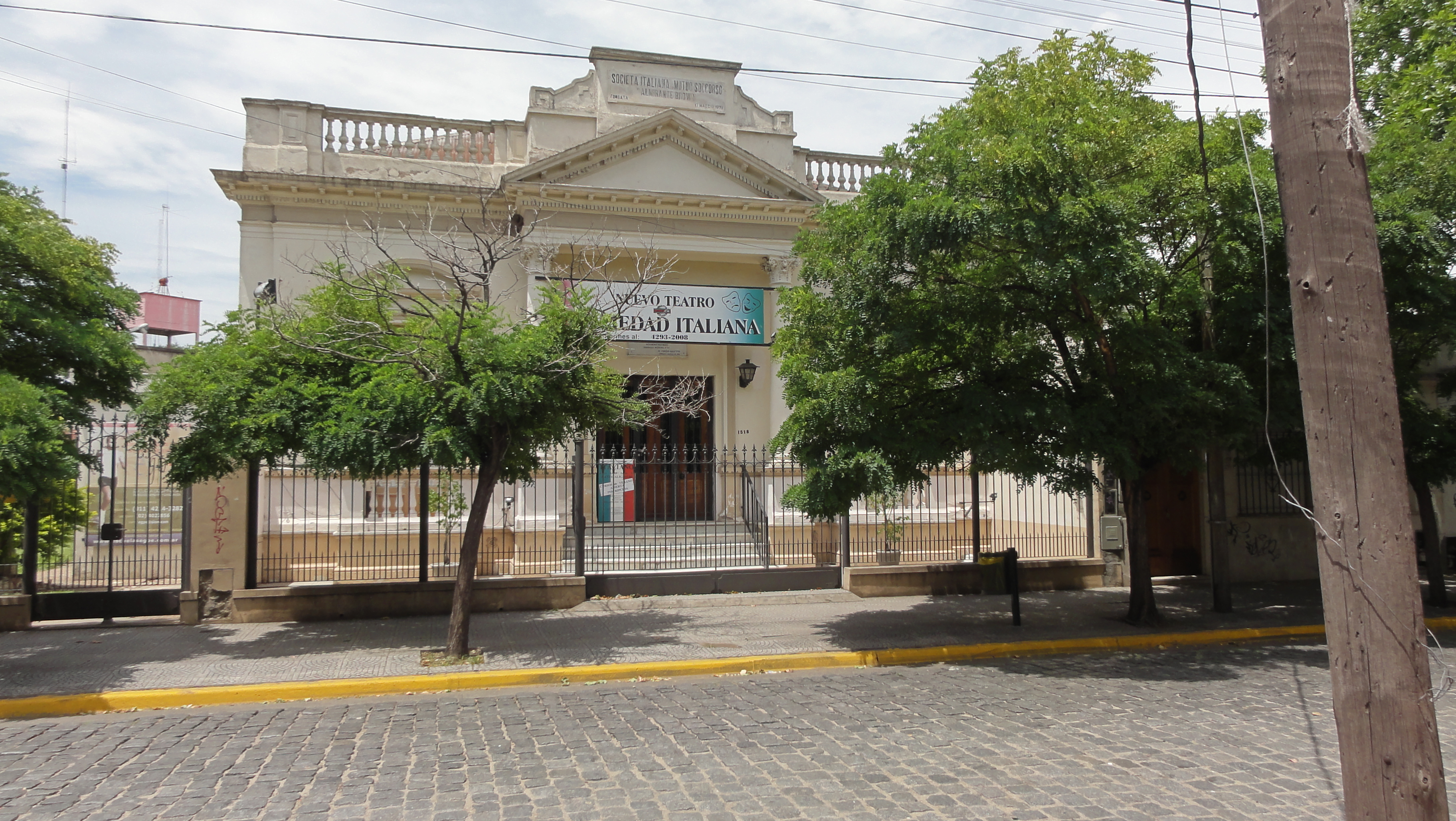
Italian Society in Adrogué

Argentine culture, in its Italian component, is the result of influences from southern Italy rather than from the north. According to the anthropologist Stefania Pedrini of the University of Rome La Sapienza, this cultural influence is due to the fact that "at the end of the 19th century Argentina was a new nation, which did not have a defined identity, and in which the grandeur European immigration has influenced the construction of a national being, through a policy of very strong cultural syncretism." At the same time there are Italian traditions still maintained in Argentina but forgotten or little remembered in Italy. Many of these Italians who brought their culture came from the lower middle classes.

=== Language ===
According to Ethnologue, Argentina has more than 1,500,000 Italian speakers, making it the third most spoken language in the nation (after Spanish and English). In spite of the large Italian immigration, the Italian language never truly took hold in Argentina, partly because at the time of mass immigration, almost all Italians spoke their native regional languages rather than what is now standard Italian, precluding the expansion of the use of Italian as a primary language in Argentina. The similarity between Spanish and many of those languages also enabled the immigrants to acquire communicative competence in Spanish with relative ease, and thus to assimilate linguistically without much difficulty.

By 1840, Italian-language newspapers were already published in Buenos Aires, increasing in 1900. The main one was La Patria degli Italiani ("The homeland of the Italians"), which in turn was the third most important in Argentina, with a circulation of 14,000 copies. On 22 February 1917, the government of Hipólito Yrigoyen, with Decree n. 6925, made the teaching of the Italian language compulsory in the 4th and 5th grades of secondary school in national schools.

Italian immigration from the second half of the 19th century to the beginning of the 20th century made a lasting and significant impact on the intonation of Argentina's vernacular Spanish. Preliminary research has shown that Rioplatense Spanish, particularly the speech of the city of Buenos Aires, has intonation patterns that resemble those of Italian dialects (especially the ones whose substratum is the Neapolitan language) and differ markedly from the patterns of other forms of Spanish. That correlates well with immigration patterns in Argentina, particularly Buenos Aires, which had huge numbers of Italian settlers since the 19th century. According to a study conducted by the National Scientific and Technical Research Council of Argentina, and published in Bilingualism: Language and Cognition (ISSN 1366–7289), the researchers note that this is a relatively recent phenomenon, starting in the early 20th century with the main wave of Southern Italian immigration. Until then, the porteño accent was more similar to that of Spain, particularly Andalusia.

Lunfardo is a slang born and developed in the city of Buenos Aires and its suburbs, which has spread to other nearby cities such as Rosario (in the Santa Fe Province) and Montevideo, Uruguay. The word comes from Lombard, a language spoken mainly in Lombardy (a region located in northern Italy). The sounds of the lunfardo feeds mainly from the languages of Italy, especially the northern ones, because in Buenos Aires the Italian colony is very extensive and has left onomasiology and terminology a vast lexical heritage. Additionally, lunfardo has taken its own words, expressions, or ways of speaking (borrowings) from various languages such as French, Portuguese, English; other words arrived from the pampa by means of the gauchos; and a few came from Argentina's native population. Lunfardo words are inserted in the normal flow of Rioplatense Spanish sentences. Thus, a Spanish-speaking Mexican reading tango lyrics needs only the translation of a discrete set of words, not a grammar guide. Most tango lyrics use lunfardo sparsely, but some songs (such as El Ciruja, or most lyrics by Celedonio Flores) employ lunfardo heavily. Here are some examples:

- Birra – Beer (cfr. Italian, Neapolitan birra – beer)
- Buonyorno – Good morning (cfr. Italian buongiorno – good morning)
- Chapar – To kiss / to grab (cfr. Piedmontese ciapé, Venetian ciapar – to grab)
- Fiaca – laziness (cfr. Italian fiacco, Piedmontese fiach – exhausted)
- Laburar – To work (cfr. Italian lavorare, Venetian laorar – to work)
- Manyar – To know / to eat (cfr. Italian mangiare, Sicilian manciari – to eat)
- Mina – Female (cfr. Italian femmina ("female"), Sicilian fimmina ("woman"))
- Mufa – Unlucky person (cfr. Italian muffa, Piedmontese mofa – mold)
- Parlar – To speak (cfr. Italian parlare, Neapolitan parlà – to speak)
- Pibe – Boy (cfr. old Italian pivo – boy, apprentice)

Between about 1880 and 1900, Argentina received a large number of peasants from the South of Italy, who arrived with little or no schooling in Spanish. As the immigrants strove to communicate with the local criollos, they produced a variable mixture of Spanish with Italian languages and dialects, specially Neapolitan. The pidgin language was given the derogatory name cocoliche by the locals. Since the children of the immigrants grew up speaking Spanish at school, work, and military service, Cocoliche remained confined mostly to the first generation immigrants and slowly fell out of use. The pidgin has been depicted humorously in literary works and in the Argentine sainete theater, such as by Dario Vittori.

=== Cuisine ===
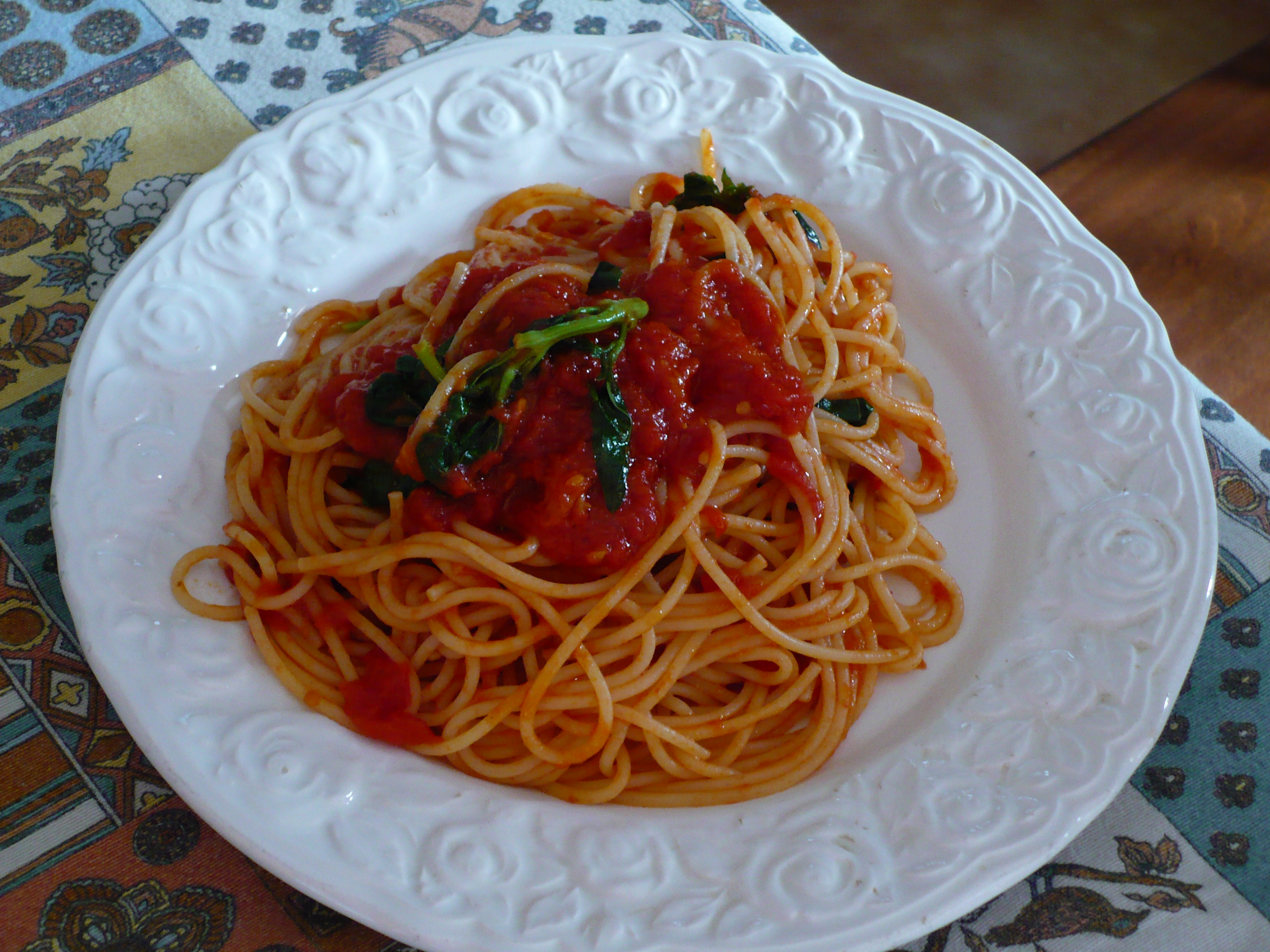
Pasta is a feature of the Argentine cuisine

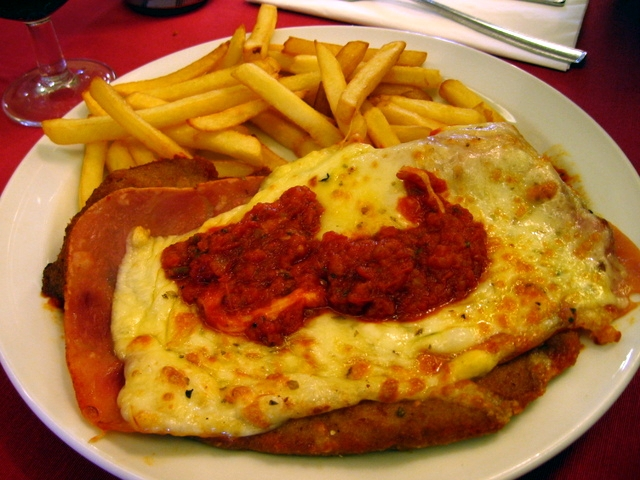
"Milanesa a la napolitana" with French fries

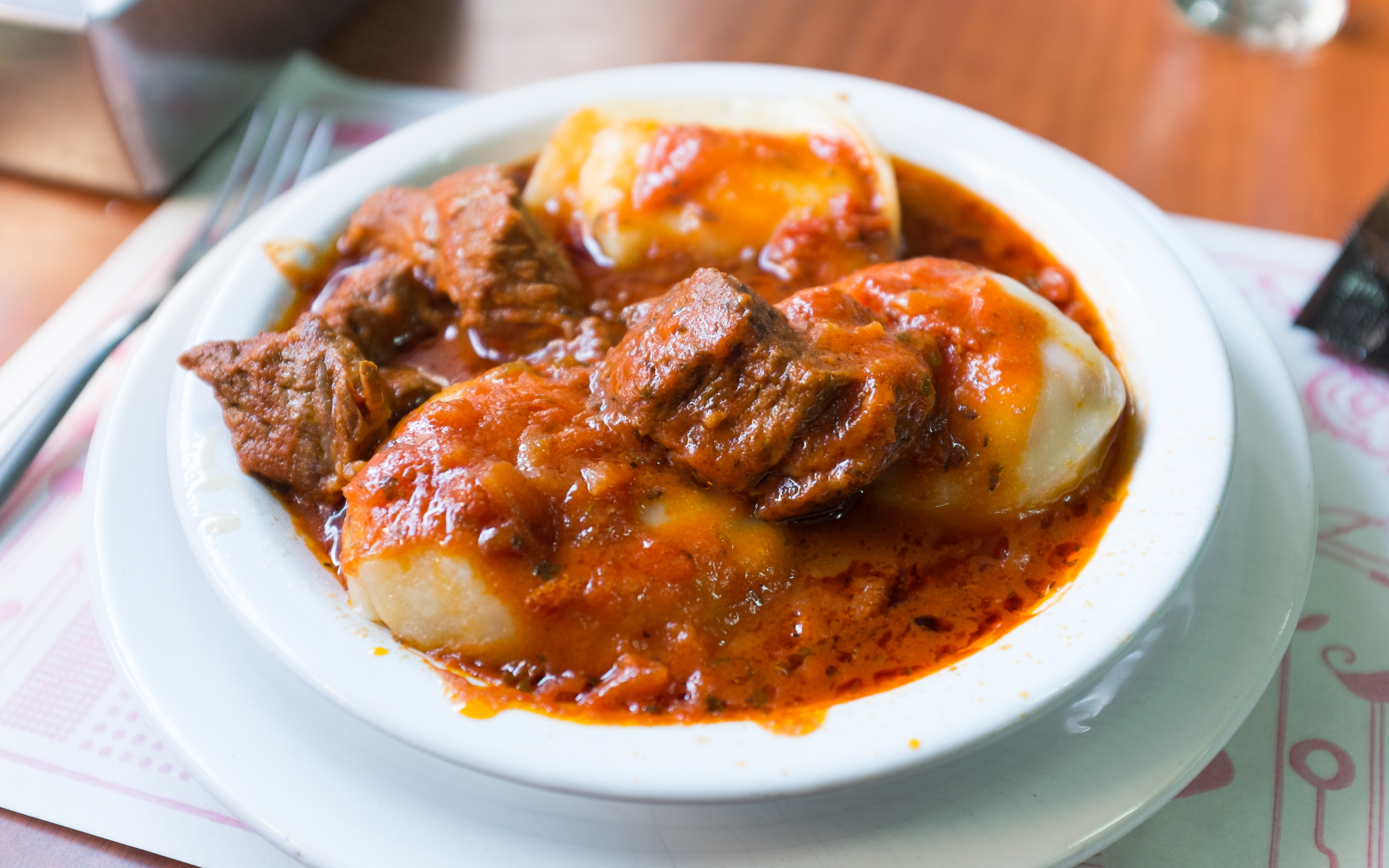
Argentine "Sorrentinos"

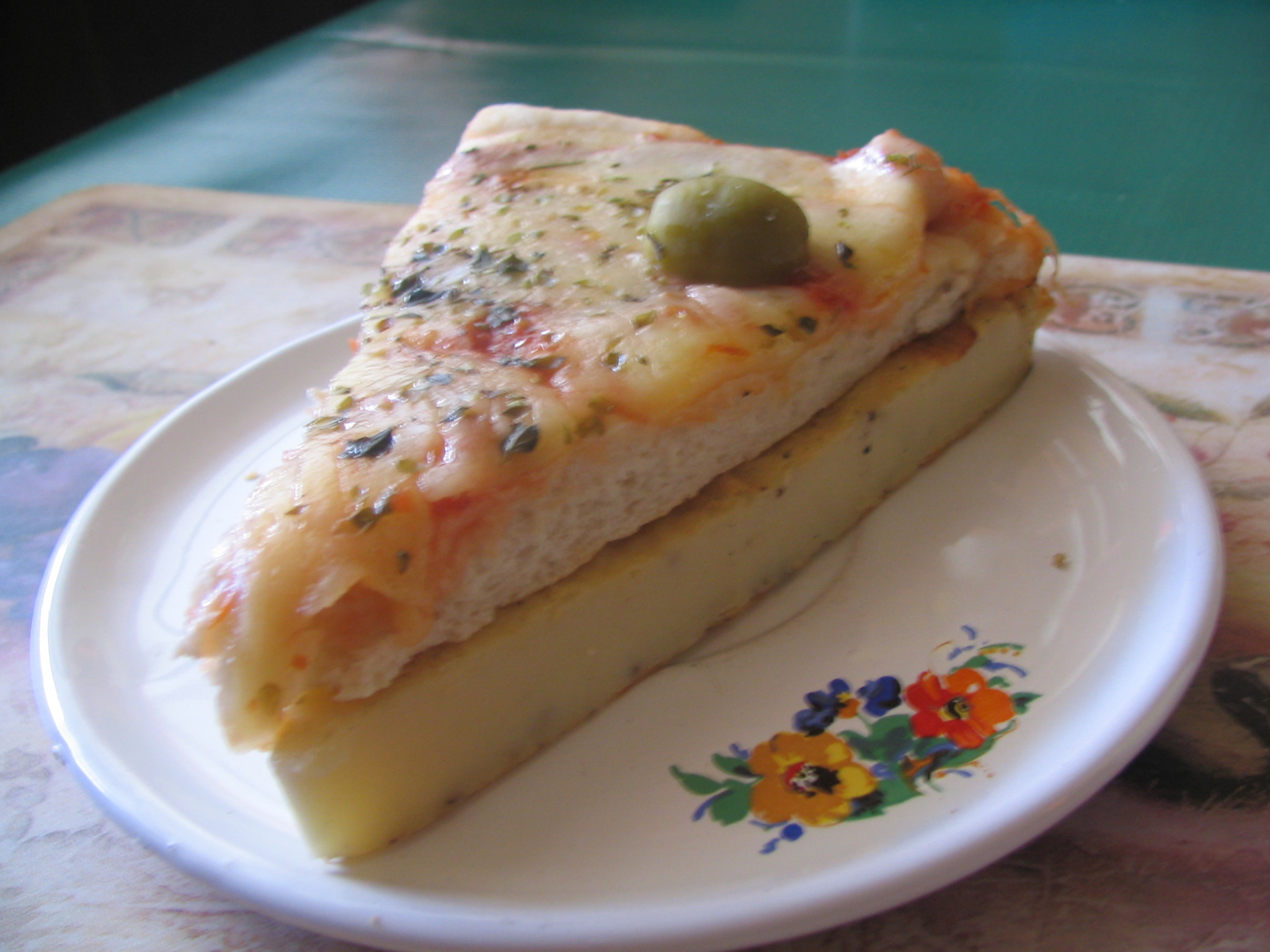
Argentine "Pizza over Fainá"

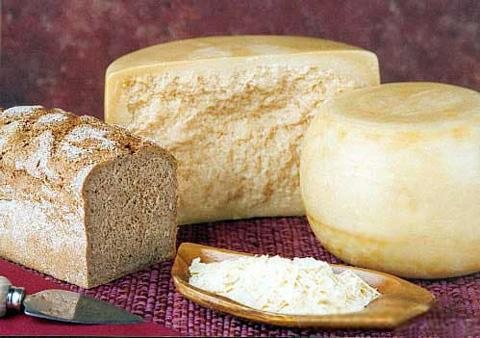
Argentine "Reggianito"

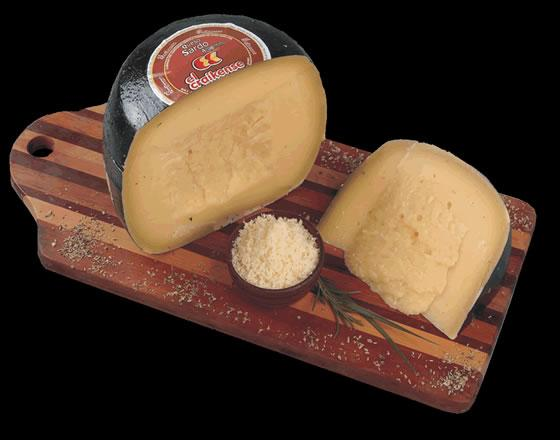
Argentine "Sardo"

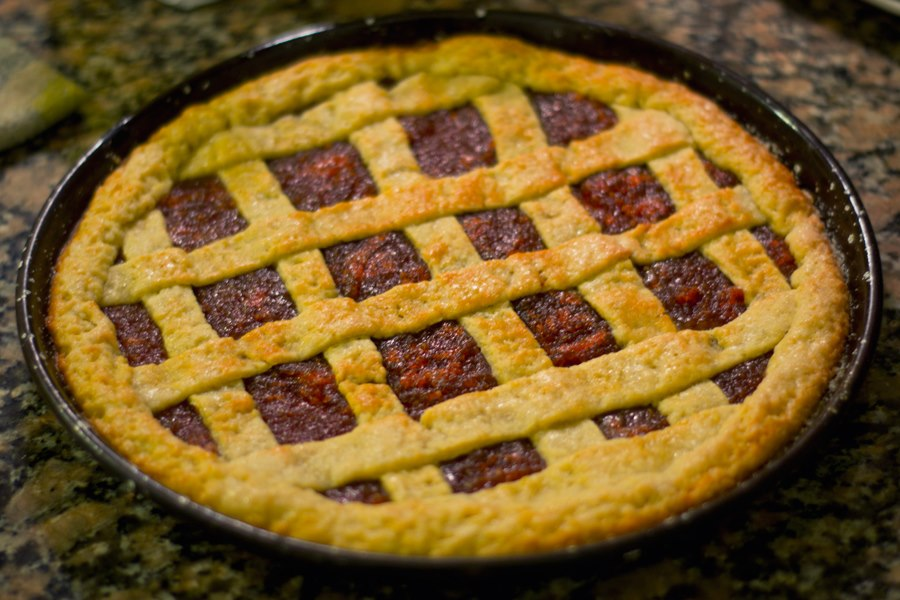
Argentine "Pasta frola"

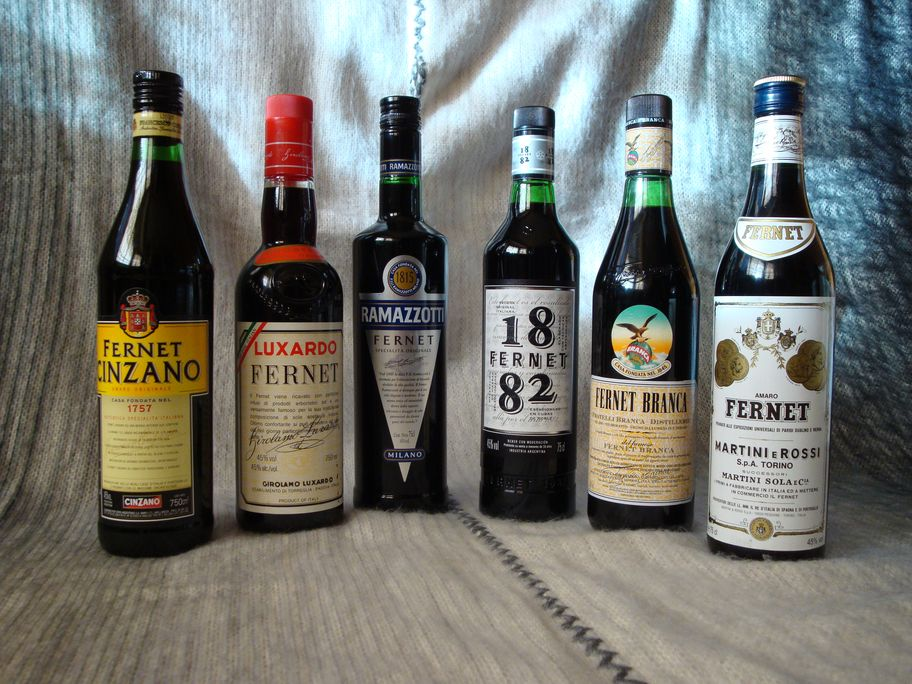
Different brands of Fernet

Argentine cuisine has been strongly influenced by Italian cuisine; the typical Argentine diet is a variation of the Mediterranean diet.

Italian staple dishes like pizza and pasta are common. Pasta is extremely common, either simple unadorned pasta with butter or oil or accompanied by a tomato or bechamel based sauce. Other similarities are found in the presence of the bañacauda (bagna càuda).

Pizza (locally pronounced pisa or pitsa), for example, has been wholly subsumed and, in its Argentine form, more closely resembles Italian pizza al taglio but round instead of rectangular. Pizza is shared between two or more people, not the usual Italian personal pizza. Typical or exclusively Argentine pizzas include pizza canchera, pizza rellena (stuffed pizza), pizza por metro (pizza by the meter), and pizza a la parrilla (grilled pizza). While Argentine pizza derives from Neapolitan cuisine, the Argentine fugaza/fugazza comes from the focaccia xeneise (from Genoa), but its preparation is different from its Italian counterpart, and the addition of cheese to make the dish (fugaza con queso or fugazzeta) started in Argentina.

Fainá is a type of thin bread made with chickpea flour (adopted from northern Italy). The name comes from the Ligurian word for the Italian farinata. Pizzerias in Buenos Aires often offer fainá, which is eaten with pizza, a wedge of fainá on top of a wedge of pizza.

Pastas (pasta, always in the plural) still surpass pizzas in consumption levels. Among them are tallarines (fettuccine), ravioles (ravioli), ñoquis (gnocchi), lasañas (lasagna), and canelones (cannelloni). In Argentina there are also Italian restaurants specializing in pasta. In Argentina, pasta is generally cooked, served and eaten in the local way, called all'uso-nostro ("for our use" or "our way"), a phrase of Italian origin.

For example, pasta is often eaten with white bread ("French bread"). That can be explained by the low cost of bread and the fact that Argentine pastas tend to come with a large amount of tuco sauce (Italian sugo) and accompanied by estofado (Italian stufato). Less commonly, pastas are eaten with a dressing of pesto, a green sauce made with basil, or salsa blanca (béchamel sauce).

Sorrentinos are also a local dish with a misleading name (they do not come from Sorrento but were invented in the Rio de La Plata region). It is believed that sorrentinos are a local derivation of the Italian ravioli capresi, whose dough is instead elaborated with flour, water and olive oil, while the filling is made with caciotta cheese, flavoured with oregano. Most sources point to an Italian immigrant from Sorrento, Rosalía Persico or his son Cayetano Persico, who created this pasta while working in a famous trattoria of Mar del Plata, while other sources state that they originated in another restaurant in Mar del Plata called Sorrento. They look like big round ravioles stuffed with mozzarella, cottage cheese and basil in tomato sauce.

Polenta comes from Northern Italy and is very common throughout Argentina. Similar to polenta concia in Italy, it is eaten as a main dish, with sauce and melted cheese, or it may accompany a stew. Since a tonic property has been attributed to it, the expression tener polenta ("having polenta") is used colloquially as a synonym for having strength. At the beginning of the 20th century, both in Italy and in Argentina, the popular classes ate polenta accompanied by bird meat. Buseca, a Lombard dish made with tripe, beans, tomato puree, carrots and celery, is also popular in Argentina.

Milanesas are one of the most popular dishes in Argentina and have been described as "one of the quintessential Río de la Plata dishes". A common dish of this variety is the milanesa a la napolitana, an Argentine innovation despite its name, which comes from former Buenos Aires restaurant "Nápoli." They are the legacy of Italian immigrants, who introduced cotoletta alla milanese, a dish from Milan, in the late 19th century and early 20th century. During that time, Argentina experienced a huge European immigration wave, with most immigrants coming from Italy. Milanesas are so ubiquitous to Argentine culture that the country even has a "Day of the Milanesa", celebrated on 3 May.

Among the foods that Italian immigrants have reproduced in Argentina are also some cheeses. The reggianito was one of the first reproductions of Parmigiano Reggiano, the sardo, which unlike the Pecorino sardo is made with cow's milk, the romano, a reinterpretation of the Pecorino Romano and the provolone. Cremoso cheese derives instead from Italian cheeses with similar characteristics as Crescenza and is the most consumed cheese in Argentina.

Pasta frola is a typical Argentine recipe heavily influenced by Southern Italian cuisine, known as pasta frolla in Italy. Pasta frola consists of a buttery pastry base with a filling made of quince jam, sweet-potato jam or milk caramel (dulce de leche) and topped with thin strips of the same pastry, forming a squared pattern. It is an Argentine tradition to eat pastafrola with mate in the afternoon. The dish is also very popular in Paraguay and Uruguay. The traditional Italian recipe was not prepared with latticework, unlike in Argentina, but with a lid pierced with molds in the form of hearts or flowers.

Among the desserts is the pandulce, originating from the Genoese pandolce, which is popular for Christmas and New Year's holidays. The cantuccini, desserts of Tuscan gastronomy, are also made and eaten in Argentina. Other Italian desserts are also consumed in Argentina such as tiramisu, of Venetian origin, zabaione, crostata (known in Argentina as ricotta cake) and panna cotta.

Ice cream (Spanish: Helado, Italian: gelato) is a particularly popular Argentine dessert. Its creamy texture is caused by the large proportion of cream, and many flavors are available. Ice cream was again a legacy of the Italian diaspora. Among the liqueurs are chitronchelo (limoncello) and grapa (grappa). Italian alcoholic beverages such as gancia and fernet are widely consumed in Argentina.

The ñoquis del 29 ("gnocchi of 29") defines the widespread custom in some South American countries of eating a plate of gnocchi on the 29th of each month. The custom is widespread especially in the states of the Southern Cone such as Brazil, Argentina, Paraguay, Uruguay; these countries being recipients of a considerable Italian immigration between the end of the 19th century and the beginning of the 20th century. There is a ritual that accompanies lunch with gnocchi, namely putting money under the plate which symbolizes the desire for new gifts. It is also customary to leave a banknote or coin under the plate to attract luck and prosperity to the dinner.

The tradition of serving gnocchi on the 29th of each month stems from a legend based on the story of Saint Pantaleon, a young doctor from Nicomedia who, after converting to Christianity, made a pilgrimage through northern Italy. There Pantaleon practiced miraculous cures for which he was canonized. According to legend, on one occasion when he asked Venetian peasants for bread, they invited him to share their poor table. In gratitude, Pantaleon announced a year of excellent fishing and excellent harvests. That episode occurred on 29 July, and for this reason that day is remembered with a simple meal represented by gnocchi.

=== Italian Immigrant Day ===
The Argentine national law n. 24,561 established that Italian Immigrant Day be celebrated each year on 3 June as recognition of Italian immigrants and their contribution to Argentina. This date was chosen because it is the day of the birth of Manuel Belgrano, of Genoese origin. Belgrano was the politician and military leader who created the flag of Argentina. His father was Italian.

=== Architecture ===
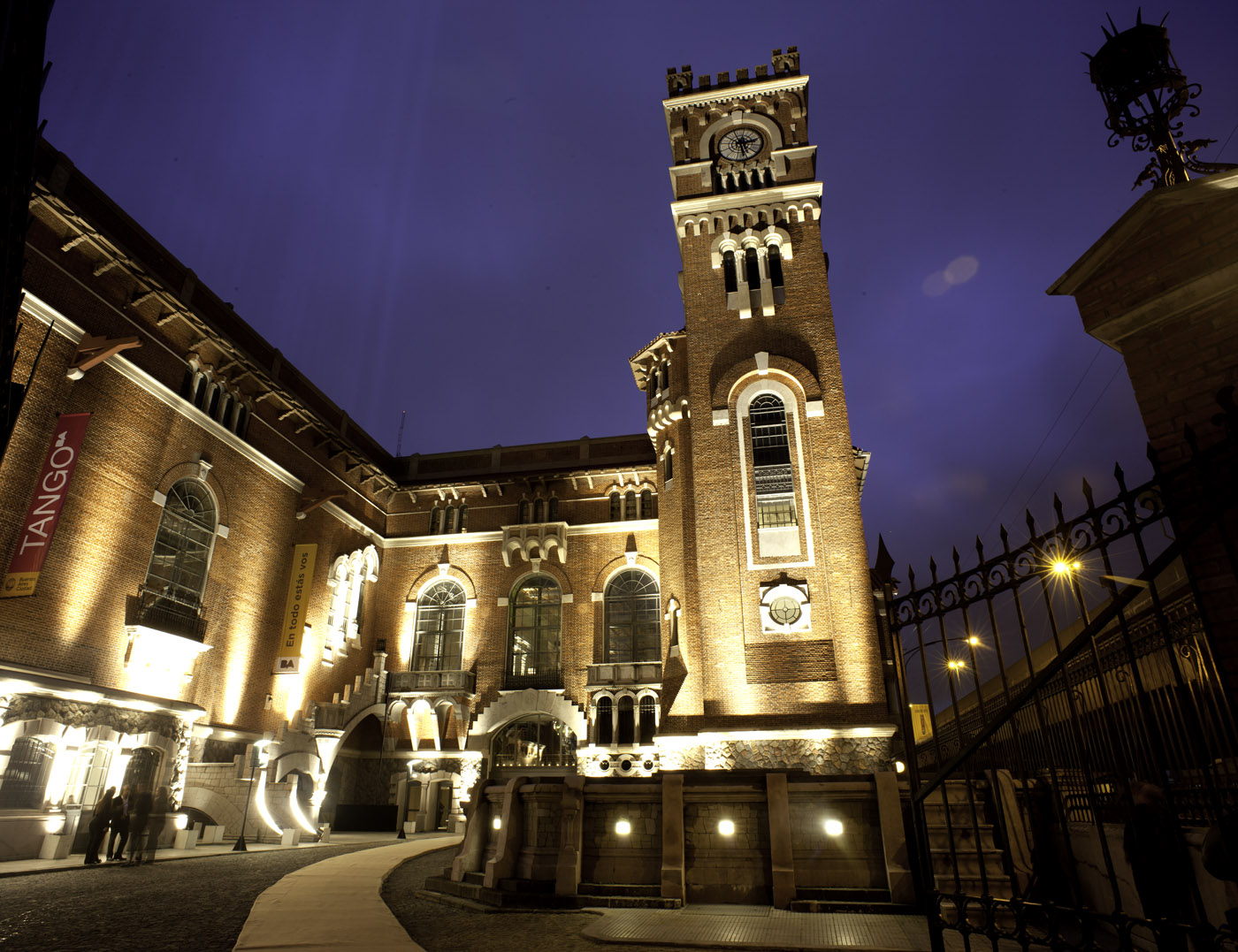
The Arts Powerhouse (Usina del Arte), inaugurated on 23 May 2012, in a former Italian-Argentine Electric Company (CIAE) facility originally built in 1916 in La Boca, Buenos Aires

The Italian architect Giovanni Chiogna, who emigrated to Argentina from Trento, was hired by the Italian-Argentine Electric Company (CIAE) to build more than 200 structures for power plants, substations and substations in various parts of Buenos Aires. Currently some buildings maintain their function, while others have been transformed. These buildings are characterized by having a Florentine neo-Renaissance style originating in northern Italy, where Chiogna came from, with buildings that are characterized by the presence of stone and exposed brick bases, round arched windows, medieval turrets and other decorative elements.

=== Popular culture ===
From the Apennines to the Andes is a short fictional story included by Edmondo de Amicis in his novel Heart, published in 1886. It tells the story of the long and complicated journey of a 13-year-old boy, Marco, from Genoa, Italy to Argentina, in search of his mother, who had immigrated there two years earlier.

Il Gaucho is a film made in 1965 by the Italian director Dino Risi. It was co-produced by Clemente Lococo, an Argentine production company, and in Argentina it was released as Un italiano en la Argentina ("An Italian in Argentina"). It was shot in Argentina.

The songs of Ivano Fossati Italiani d'Argentina ("Italians from Argentina"), contained in the album Discanto, and Argentina by Francesco Guccini, present in the Guccini album, are dedicated to the feeling of distance of the emigrants from Italy.

=== Music ===
The Italian contribution to the music of Argentina has been extremely important for tango. Among the first and most important tangueros were immigrants and descendants of Italians. There are also numerous tango lyrics inspired by Italian immigrants and their lives.

== Institutions ==
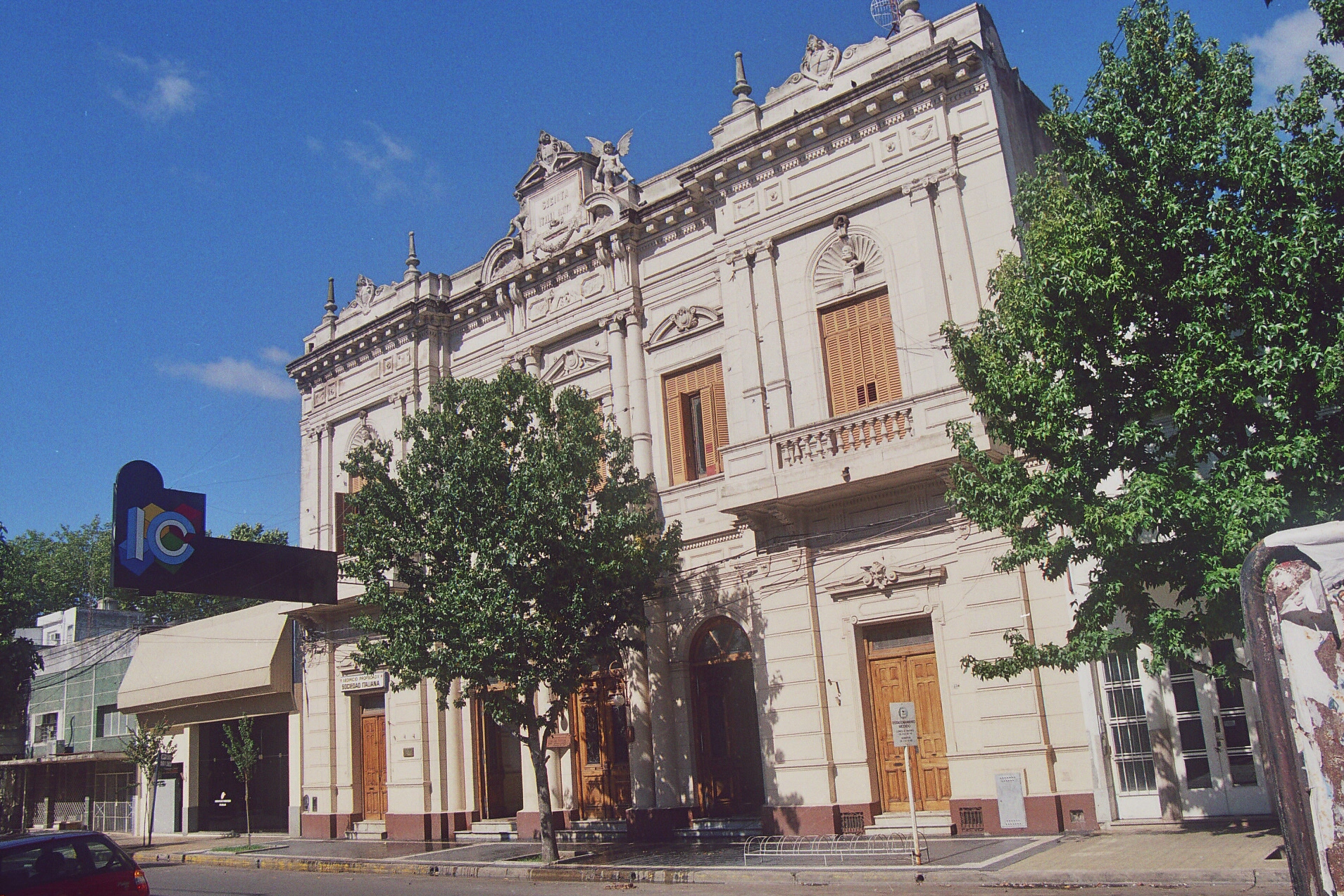
Italian Association of Junín, province of Buenos Aires

The typology of Italian associations in Argentina is varied and includes, among others, cultural institutions, sports centers, social organizations and war veteran organizations. The Italian Association of Mutuality and Education "Unione y Benevolenza" was created by 53 Italians on 18 July 1858, becoming the first Italian institution in South America. Already in 1866 Italian language lessons were held there. The Confederation of Italian Federations in Argentina dates back to 1912 and brings together all the federations of Italian-Argentine associations. The Dante Alighieri Society is the most important Italian institution for the formation of the Italian language and culture. It has 126 offices in Argentina, with Buenos Aires being its main office outside Italy.

There are also the Committees for Italians Abroad, bodies of the Italian state created by law with functions in every consular jurisdiction, and there are several in Argentina. They represent the Italian community before the Italian consular authorities and the Argentine authorities.

== Education ==
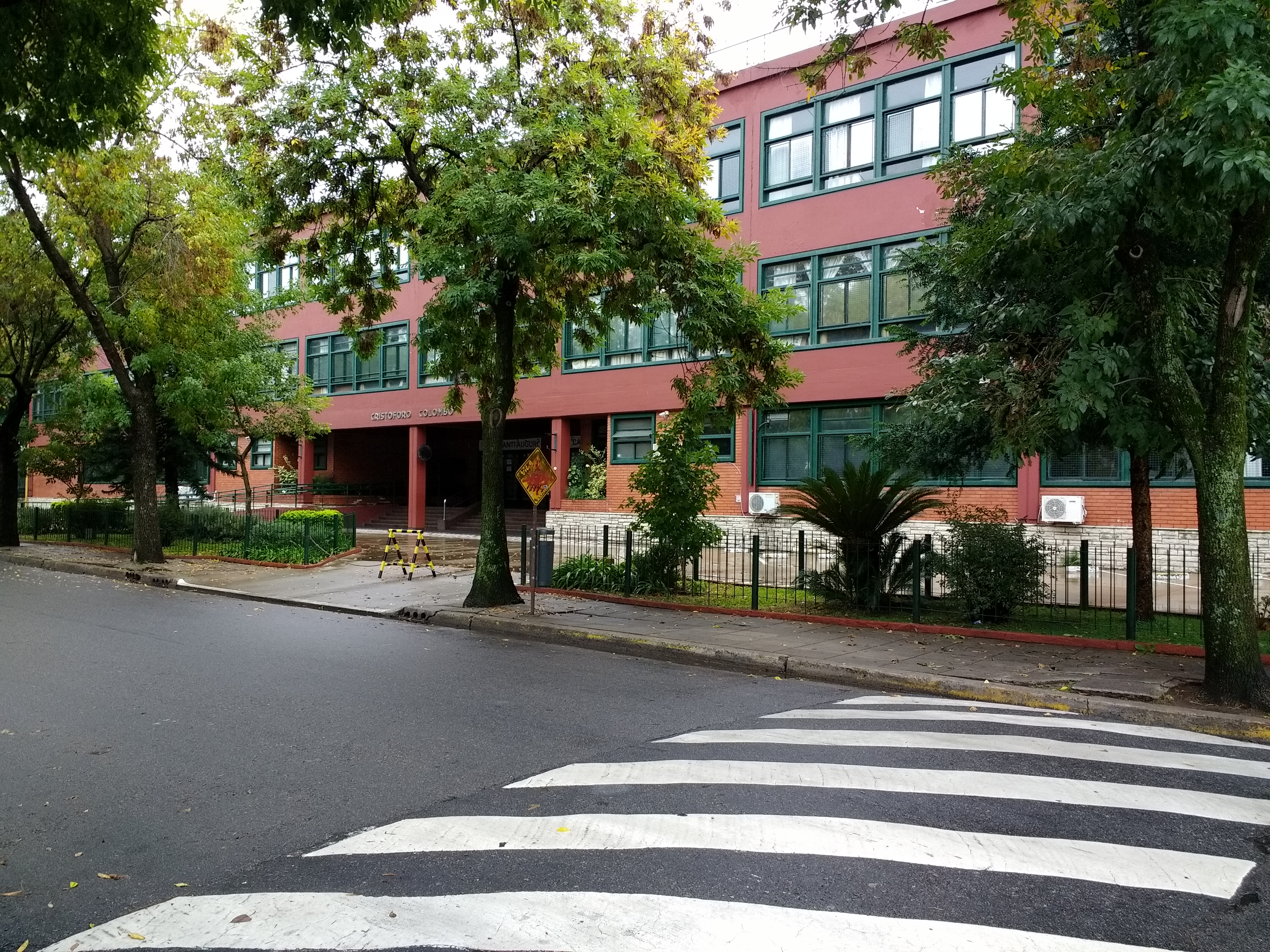
Scuola Italiana Cristoforo Colombo in Buenos Aires

Italian international schools in Argentina include:

- Scuola Italiana Cristoforo Colombo (Buenos Aires)
- Istituto Scolastico "Scuola Edmondo De Amicis" (Buenos Aires, Rosario)
- Scuola "Dante Alighieri" (Córdoba, Rosario)
- Istituto di Cultura Italica (La Plata)
- Associazione Scuole Italiane "XXI Aprile" (Mendoza)
- Centro Culturale Italiano Scuole Alessandro Manzoni (Olivos and Villa Adelina)

== Italian press in Argentina ==
The Italian-language press in Argentina essentially consists of two publications:

- L'Eco d'Italia ("The Echo of Italy"), Italian-language Argentine weekly magazine aimed at the Italian community in South America.
- L'Italiano ("The Italian"), Italian-language Argentine daily newspaper.

== Argentine oriundi ==
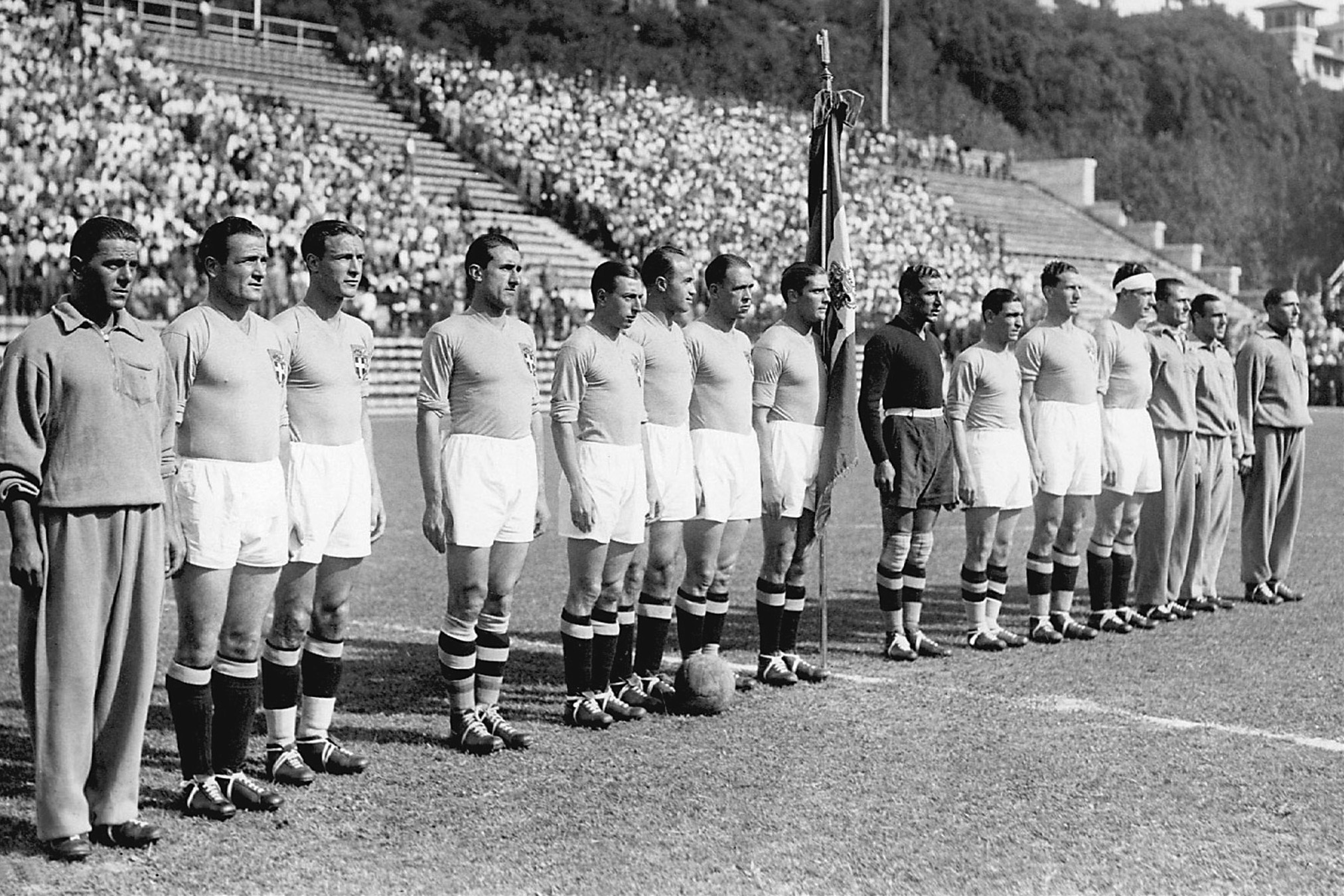
The Italy national football team lined up in midfield before the 1934 FIFA World Cup final, then won. The team fielded two Italian Argentines, Luis Monti and Raimundo Orsi.

In football, Italian Argentine "oriundi" Luis Monti and Raimundo Orsi were finalists of the FIFA World Cup with Argentina national football team in the 1930 FIFA World Cup and then champions with Italy national football team in the 1934 FIFA World Cup.

Other examples of Italian Argentine oriundi in football are Omar Sívori, Humberto Maschio and Antonio Valentín Angelillo, the three stars of the Argentina national football team that won the 1957 South American Championship, who took Italian citizenship, which allowed them to later play for the Italy national football team.

In recent years, the most famous Italian Argentine oriundo in football has been Mauro Camoranesi, who acquired Italian citizenship through a great-grandfather who in 1873 emigrated from Potenza Picena, in the Marche region, to Argentina. This allowed him to be part of Italy national football team that won the 2006 FIFA World Cup.

== Notable people ==
=== Anarchists ===
- Severino Di Giovanni, Italian-born anarchist

=== Architects ===
- César Pelli, designed some of the world's tallest buildings and other major urban landmarks

=== Artists ===
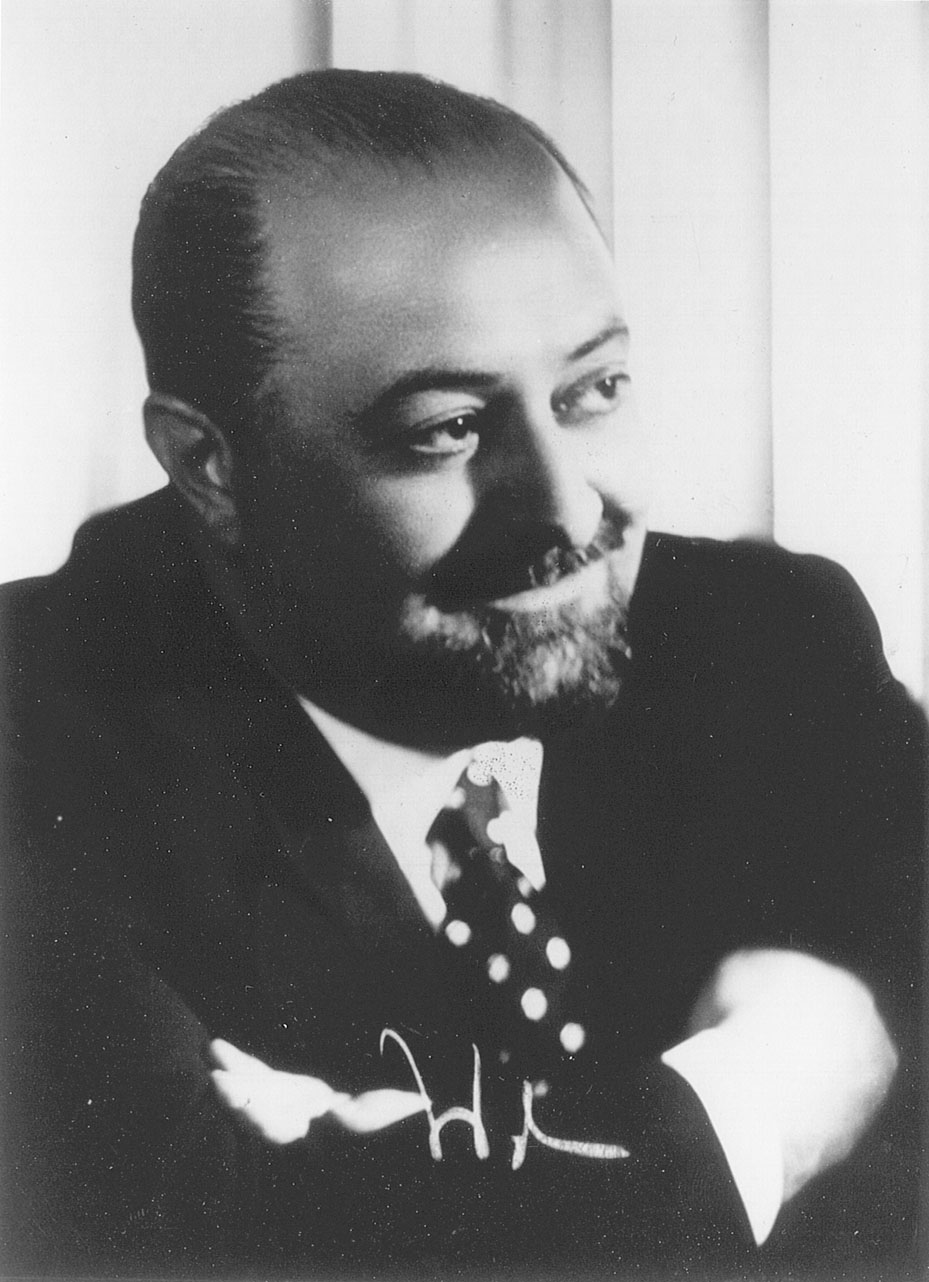
Homero Manzi

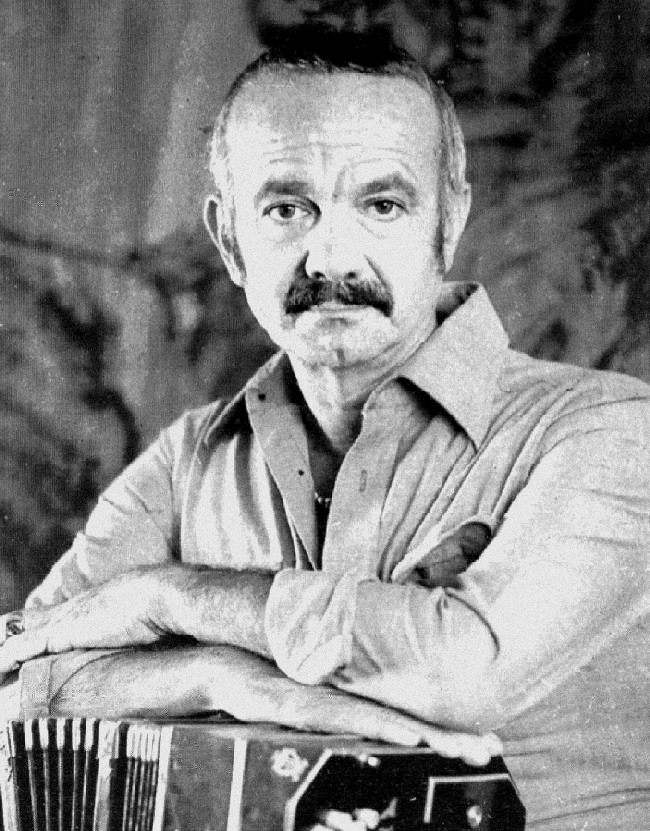
Astor Piazzolla

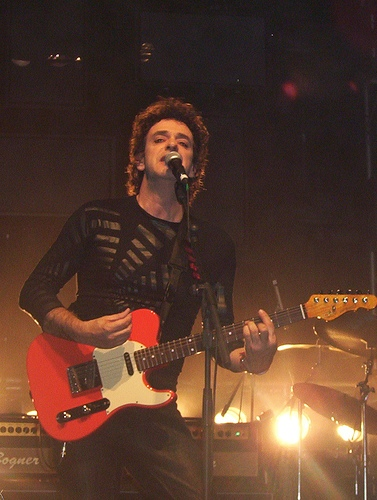
Gustavo Cerati

- Daniel Agostini, musician
- Antonio Agri, violinist
- Charly Alberti, musician
- Tito Alberti, drummer
- Juan d'Arienzo, tango musician
- Alba Arnova, dancer
- Juan Carlos Baglietto, musician
- Gato Barbieri, musician
- Agustín Bardi, tango composer
- Adrián Barilari, musician
- María Becerra, singer
- Marilina Bertoldi, musician
- Rodolfo Biagi, musician
- Raúl di Blasio, musician
- Zeta Bosio, musician
- José Antonio Bottiroli, classical musician
- José Bragato, composer
- Enrique Cadícamo, tango lyricist
- Billy Cafaro, rock and roll singer
- Andrés Calamaro, musician
- Carmen Risso de Cancellieri, dancer
- Fabiana Cantilo, singer-songwriter
- Alberto Caracciolo, tango musician
- Celeste Carballo, musician
- Francisco de Caro, tango composer
- Julio de Caro, tango composer
- Eleonora Cassano, dancer
- Cacho Castagna, singer
- Hernán Cattáneo, musician
- Cazzu, rapper
- Gustavo Cerati, singer-songwriter
- Flavio Cianciarulo, musician
- Dalila, musician
- Enrique Santos Discépolo, tango composer
- Duki, rapper
- Lali Espósito, singer-songwriter, actress, dancer, model and director
- Valeria Gastaldi, singer
- Walter Giardino, guitarist and songwriter
- León Gieco, singer
- Gilda, singer
- Alberto Ginastera, musician
- Carlos Guastavino, musician
- Carlos Inzillo, musician
- L-Gante, singer
- Paulo Londra, singer
- Luisana Lopilato, actress, singer, and model
- Agustín Magaldi, tango and milonga singer
- Homero Manzi, tango lyricist
- Leo Mattioli, musician
- Daniel Melingo, musician
- Ricardo Mollo, musician
- Litto Nebbia, singer-songwriter
- Nicki Nicole, rapper
- Pappo, guitarist, singer and composer
- Gustavo Parisi, musician
- Soledad Pastorutti, folk singer
- Nathy Peluso, singer
- Astor Piazzolla, tango composer and bandoneon player
- Piero, singer-songwriter
- Raúl Porchetto, musician
- Ariel Puchetta, singer
- Dino Saluzzi, bandoneon player
- Alejandro Sergi, musician
- Indio Solari, musician
- Luis Alberto Spinetta, singer, guitarist, composer and poet
- Tini Stoessel, singer
- Diego Torres, singer and songwriter
- Aníbal Troilo, tango musician
- Trueno, rapper
- Lito Vitale, musician
- Vicentico, musician
- Wos, rapper

=== Business ===
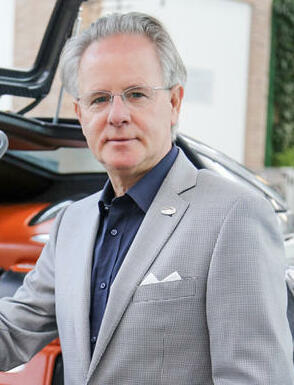
Horacio Pagani

- Daniel Angelici, president of Boca Juniors
- Poppy Bermúdez, entrepreneur
- Diego Bossio, economist
- Alejandro Bulgheroni, entrepreneur
- Carlos Bulgheroni, entrepreneur
- Alejandro Burzaco, entrepreneur
- Eduardo Costantini, real estate developer
- Héctor Magnetto, CEO of the Clarín Group, the country's largest media company.
- Enrique Mosconi, military engineer
- Horacio Pagani, car designer
- Paolo Rocca, businessman
- Torcuato di Tella, industrialist and philanthropist

=== Criminals ===
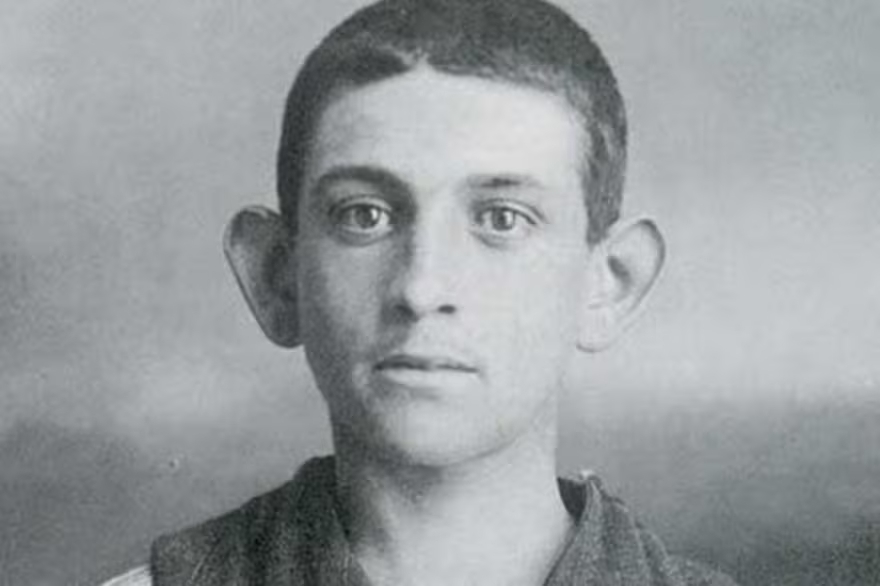
Cayetano Santos Godino

- Cayetano Santos Godino, serial killer

=== Educators ===
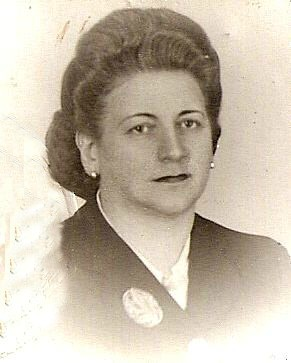
Victoria Torni

- Victoria Torni, school and piano teacher, First Lady of Argentina between 1944 and 1946.

=== Entertainers ===
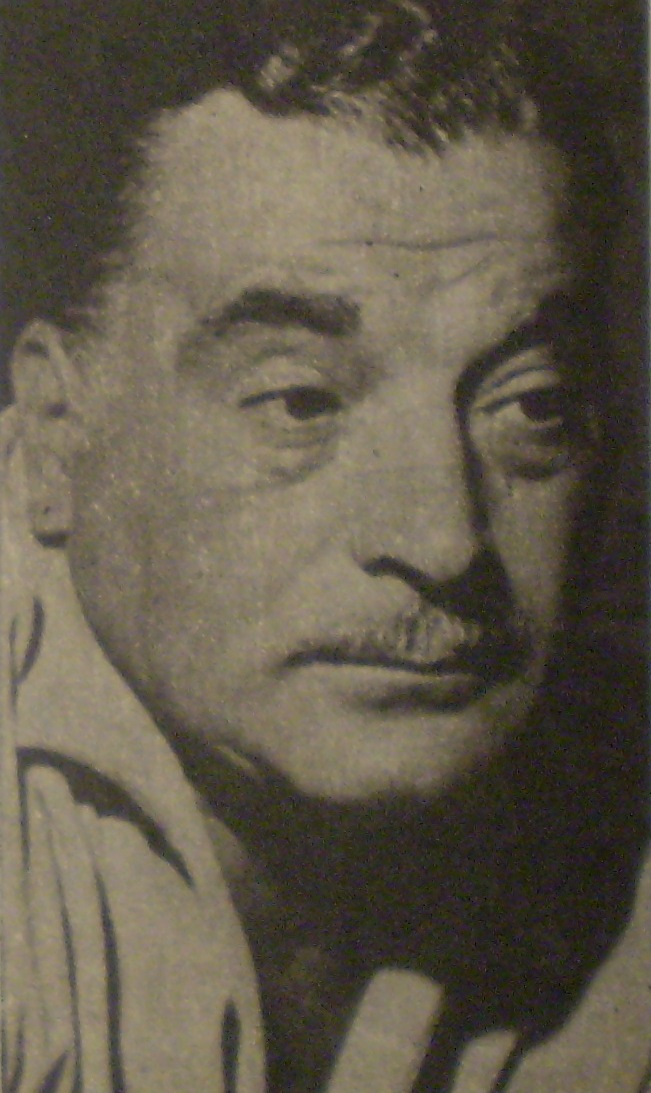
Lucas Demare

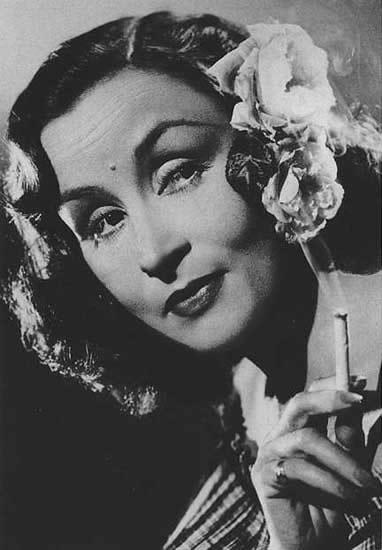
Tita Merello

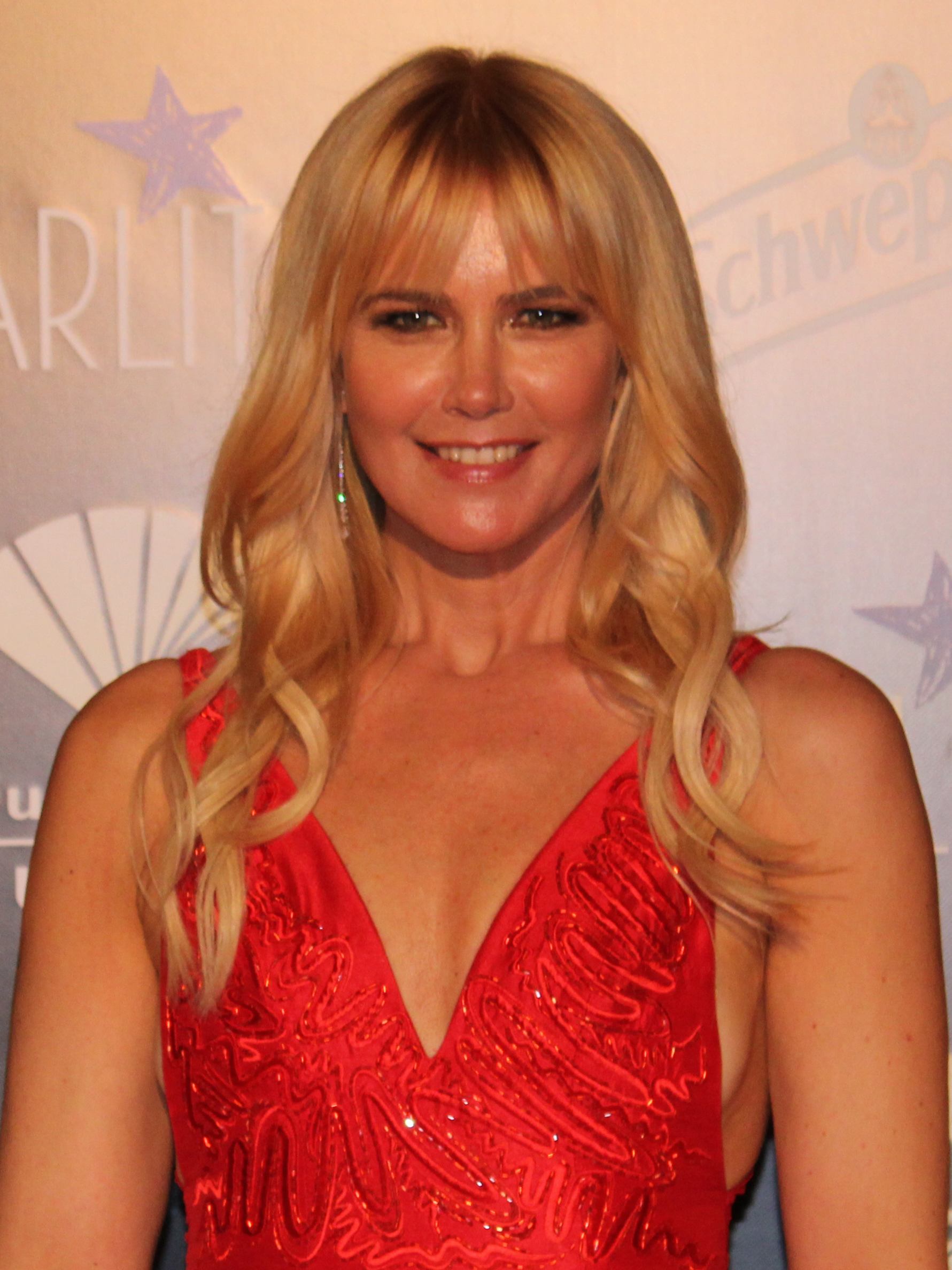
Valeria Mazza

- Daniela Anahí Bessia, celebrity TV presenter and actress, model, influencer, producer
- Quirino Cristiani, director who created the world's first animated film
- Paola Carosella, celebrity chef, TV presenter, and one of the judges of Masterchef Brasil (currently based on Sao Paulo, Brazil)
- Gimena Accardi, actress
- Graciela Alfano, actress and vedette
- Alejandro Agresti, film producer (currently based on the Netherlands)
- Ernesto Alterio, actor (currently based between his home country, Argentina and Spain)
- Héctor Alterio, actor (currently based between his home country, Argentina and Spain)
- Malena Alterio, actress (currently based in Spain)
- Luis César Amadori, film director
- Mike Amigorena, actor
- Mariana Anghileri, actress
- Norberto Aroldi, actor
- Catalina Artusi, actress
- Christian Bach, actress
- Ángeles Balbiani, actress
- Mario Baroffio, actor
- Valentina Bassi, actress
- Florencia Bertotti, actress
- Valeria Bertuccelli, actress
- Thelma Biral, actress
- José Bódalo, actor
- Patricio Borghetti, actor
- Luis Brandoni, actor
- Alicia Bruzzo, actress
- Héctor Calcaño, actor
- Juan José Campanella, film director
- Charlotte Caniggia, model and media personality
- Diego Capusotto, TV presenter
- Hugo del Carril, actor
- Antonio Carrizo, TV and radio presenter
- Evangelina Carrozzo, model
- Moria Casanova, actress
- Catrano Catrani, film director
- Agustina Cherri, actress
- Juan Chioran, actor
- Tulia Ciámpoli, actress
- Ricardo Darín, actor
- Lucas Demare, film director, screenwriter and film producer
- Alejandro Fantino, TV host
- Dolores Fonzi, TV, theatre and film actress
- Tomás Fonzi, actor
- Guillermo Francella, actor
- Nicolás Francella, actor
- Renata Fronzi, actress
- Carlos Galettini, film director, film producer and screenwriter
- Carlos Gandolfo, stage actor and director
- Darío Grandinetti, actor
- Juan Pedro Lanzani, actor and singer
- Valeria Lynch, singer and actress
- Valeria Mazza, supermodel and businesswoman
- Tita Merello, actress
- Andrés Muschietti, film director
- Florencio Parravicini, actor
- Ricardo Passano, actor
- Diego Peretti, actor
- Romina Ricci, actress, screenwriter and film director
- Violeta Rivas, singer and actress
- Oriana Sabatini, model, actress and singer
- Julián Serrano, YouTuber, actor, singer and television presenter
- Leonardo Sbaraglia, actor
- Marcelo Tinelli, TV host, media producer and businessman
- Valentina Zenere, actress, model and singer

=== Inventors ===
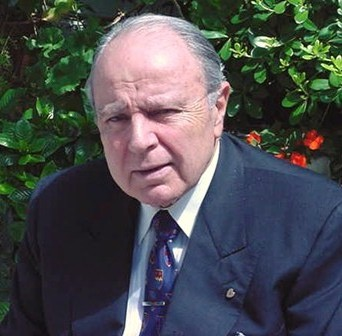
Domingo Liotta

- Sinforoso Amoedo Canaveri, doctor
- Domingo Liotta, inventor of first successful artificial heart

=== Jurists ===
- Juan de Canaveris, notary

=== Law enforcement figures ===
- Carlos Alfredo D'Amico, lawyer
- José María Campagnoli, prosecutor
- Sebastián Casanello, judge
- Susana Ruiz Cerutti, lawyer and former Chancellor

=== Journalism ===
- José Amalfitani, sports journalist
- Eduardo P. Archetti, anthropologist
- Eric Calcagno, sociologist

=== Military ===
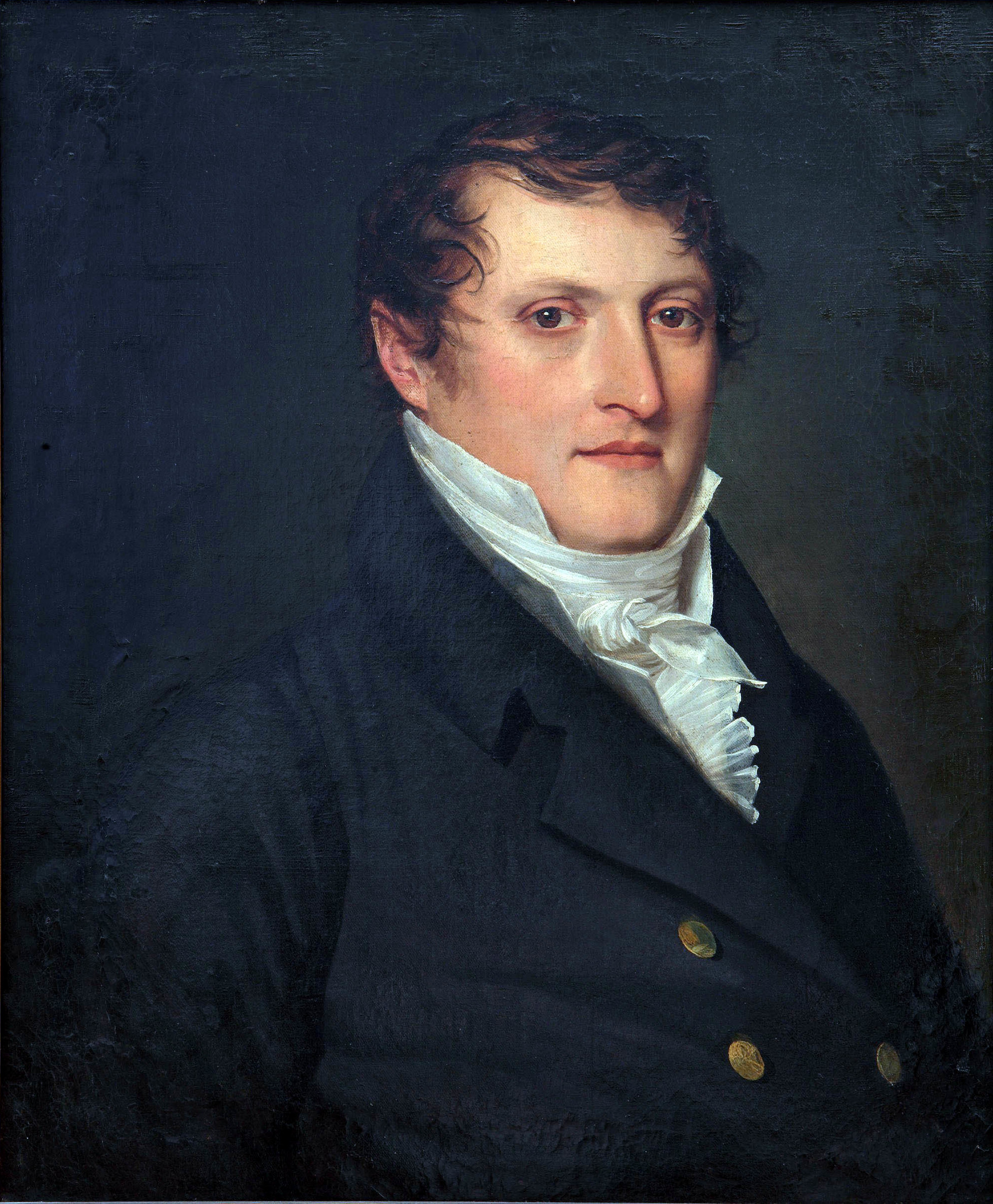
Manuel Belgrano

- Orlando Ramón Agosti, member of the military junta led by Jorge Rafael Videla that ruled Argentina between 1976 and 1981
- Joseph Gregorio Belgrano, colonel
- Manuel Belgrano, member of Primera Junta regarded as the father of the Flag of Argentina
- Reynaldo Bignone, dictatorial president of Argentina between 1982 and 1983
- Antonio Domingo Bussi, general
- Osvaldo Cacciatore, brigadier, who served as Mayor of Buenos Aires in the National Reorganization Process
- Manuel Canaveris, lieutenant
- Ángel Canavery, lieutenant colonel
- Leopoldo Galtieri, general and president of Argentina during the Falklands War

=== Painters and sculptors ===
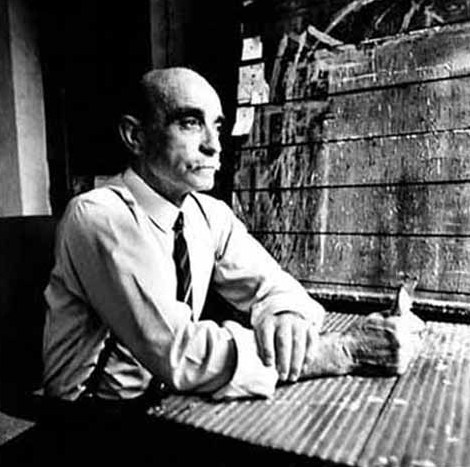
Lucio Fontana

- Antonio Alice
- Aquiles Badi
- Antonio Berni
- Erminio Blotta
- Emilio Caraffa
- Ricardo Carpani
- Juan Carlos Castagnino
- Tito Cittadini
- Pío Collivadino
- Lucio Fontana
- Raúl Soldi
- Lino Enea Spilimbergo

=== Politicians ===
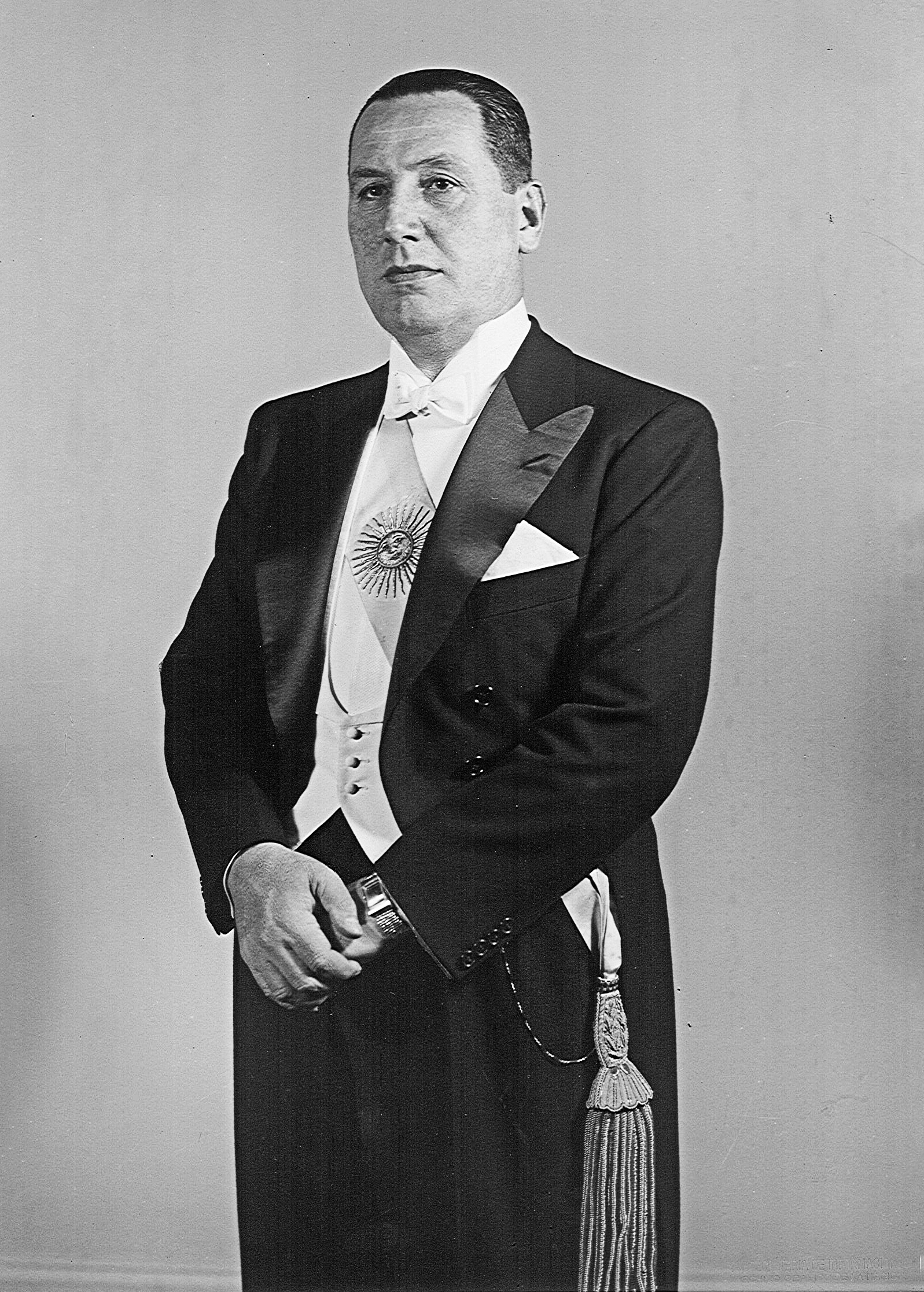
Juan Domingo Perón

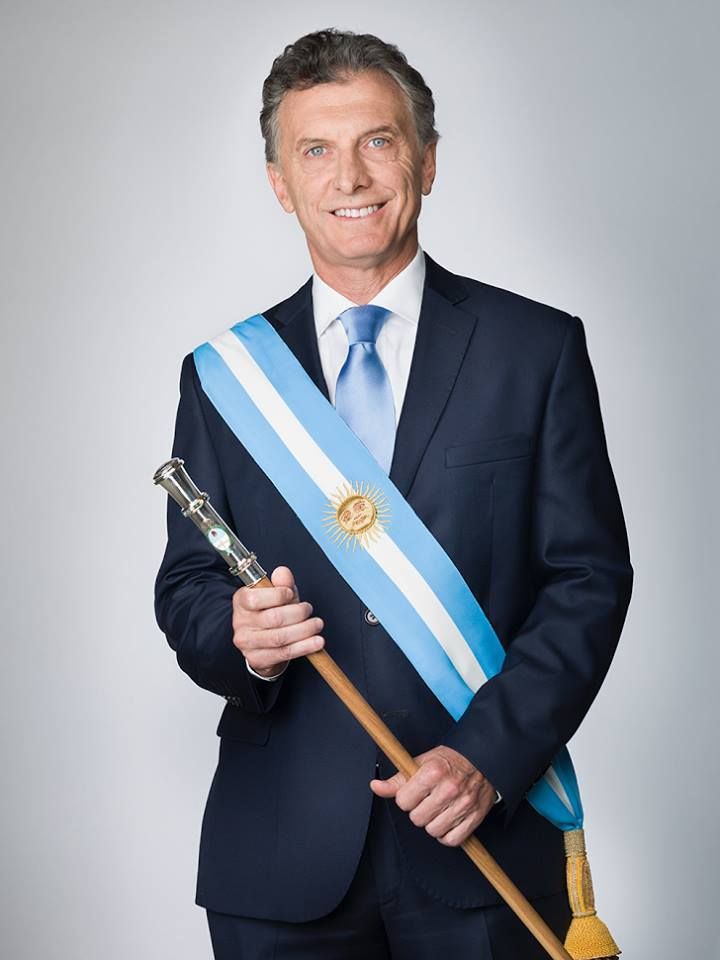
Mauricio Macri

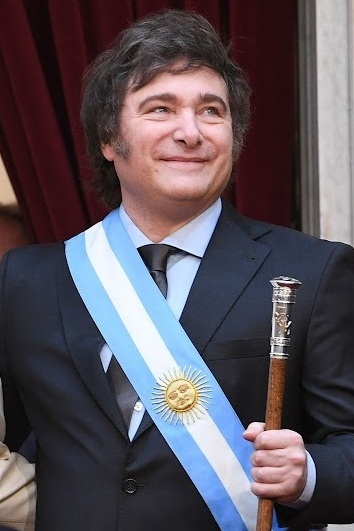
Javier Milei

- Mario Barletta, Radical Civic Union politician
- Fabio Biancalani, Justicialist Party politician
- Delia Bisutti, Solidarity and Equality politician
- Antonio Bonfatti, Socialist Party politician
- Ángel Borlenghi, Peronist politician
- Juan Atilio Bramuglia, Peronist politician
- Teodoro Bronzini, Socialist Party politician
- Jorge Busti, Justicialist Party politician
- Juan Manuel Cafferata, National Autonomist Party politician
- Antonio Cafiero, Justicialist Party politician
- Eduardo Camaño, President of Argentina
- Héctor José Cámpora, President of Argentina
- Héctor Canaveri, National Autonomist Party politician
- Pedro Canaveri, Radical Civic Union and former President of Argentine Football Association
- Dante Caputo, President of the United Nations General Assembly
- Luis Caputo, Minister of Economy
- Ramón J. Cárcano, National Autonomist Party
- Juan José Castelli, member of the Primera Junta
- Domingo Cavallo, Justicialist Party
- Renato Carlos Sersale di Cerisano, Argentine Ambassador to United Kingdom
- Alfredo Chiaradía, former Ambassador to the United States
- Hugo Cóccaro, Justicialist Party
- Arturo Colombi, Radical Civic Union
- Ricardo Colombi, Radical Civic Union
- Lucía Corpacci, Justicialist Party
- Arturo Frondizi, President of Argentina
- José María Guido, President of Argentina
- Arturo Umberto Illia, President of Argentina
- Agustín Pedro Justo, President of Argentina
- Raúl Alberto Lastiri, President of Argentina
- Eduardo Lonardi, President of Argentina
- Mauricio Macri, President of Argentina
- Sergio Massa, Minister of Economy
- Gabriela Michetti, Vice President of Argentina
- Javier Milei, Current President of Argentina
- Bartolomé Mitre, President of Argentina
- Carlos Pellegrini, President of Argentina
- Juan Perón, President of Argentina
- Fernando de la Rúa, President of Argentina
- Daniel Scioli, former governor of Buenos Aires Province
- Guido di Tella, businessman, academic, and diplomat
- Roberto Eduardo Viola, President of Argentina

=== Prelates ===
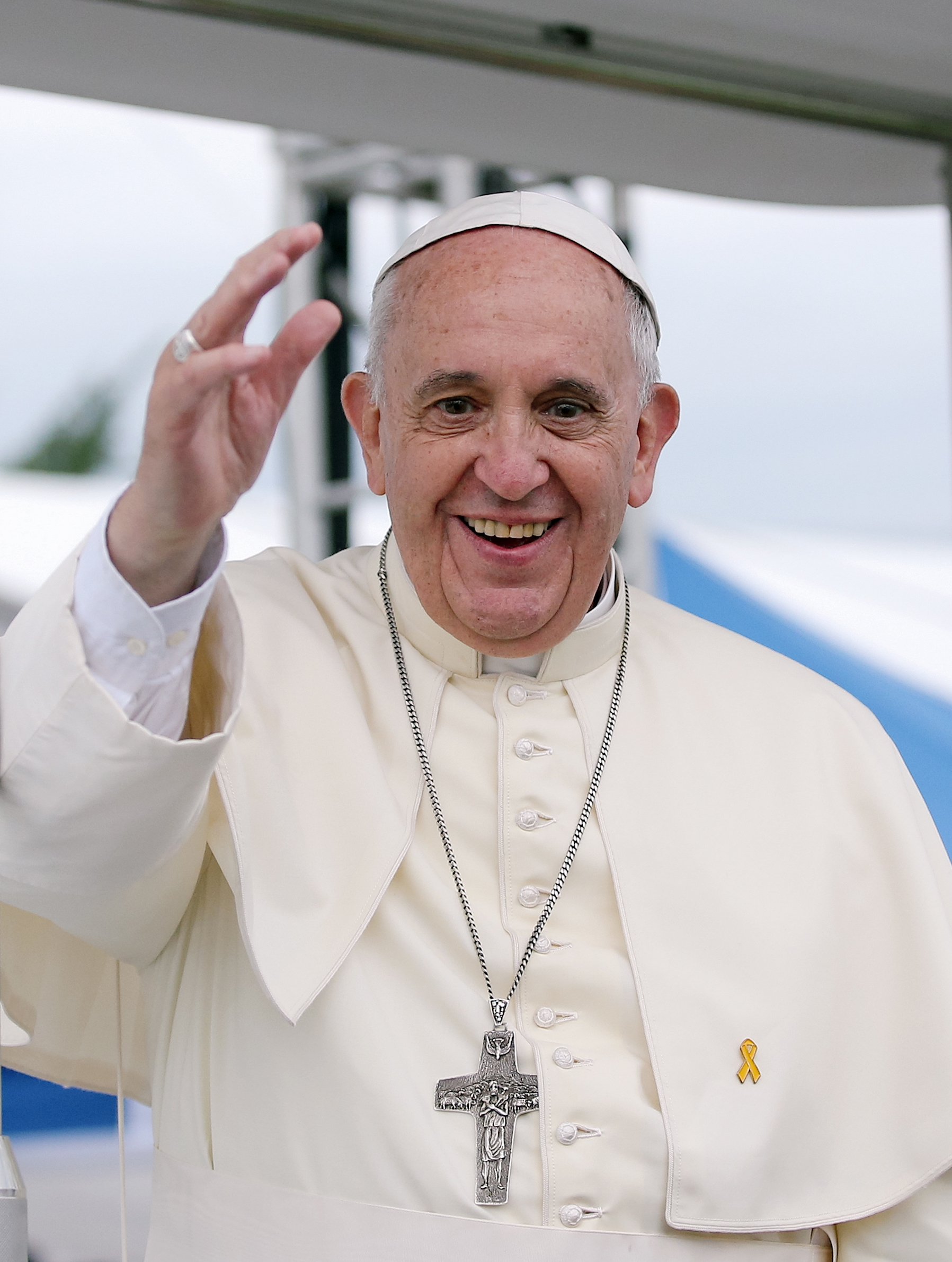
Pope Francis

- Manuel Alberti, priest and member of the Primera Junta in 1810
- Enrique Angelelli, bishop
- Carlos Azpiroz Costa, friar
- Pope Francis, born as Jorge Mario Bergoglio to Italian immigrants from Piedmont
- Rómulo Antonio Braschi, bishop
- Carlos Armando Bustos Crostelli, member of the Order of Friars Minor Capuchin
- Antonio Caggiano, Cardinal and Archbishop of Buenos Aires
- Tomás Canavery, priest
- Leonardo Castellani, priest
- Santiago Copello, Cardinal and Archbishop of Buenos Aires
- Antonio Quarracino, Cardinal and Archbishop of Buenos Aires

=== Scientists ===
- Juan Bautista Ambrosetti, archaeologist
- Florentino Ameghino, paleontologist
- José Bonaparte, paleontologist
- Zulma Brandoni de Gasparini, paleontologist
- Constanza Ceruti, archaeologist
- Primarosa Chieri, physician
- Mario Crocco, neurobiologist
- René Favaloro, cardiac surgeon
- José Ingenieros, physician, pharmacist, philosopher, and essayist

=== Sports ===
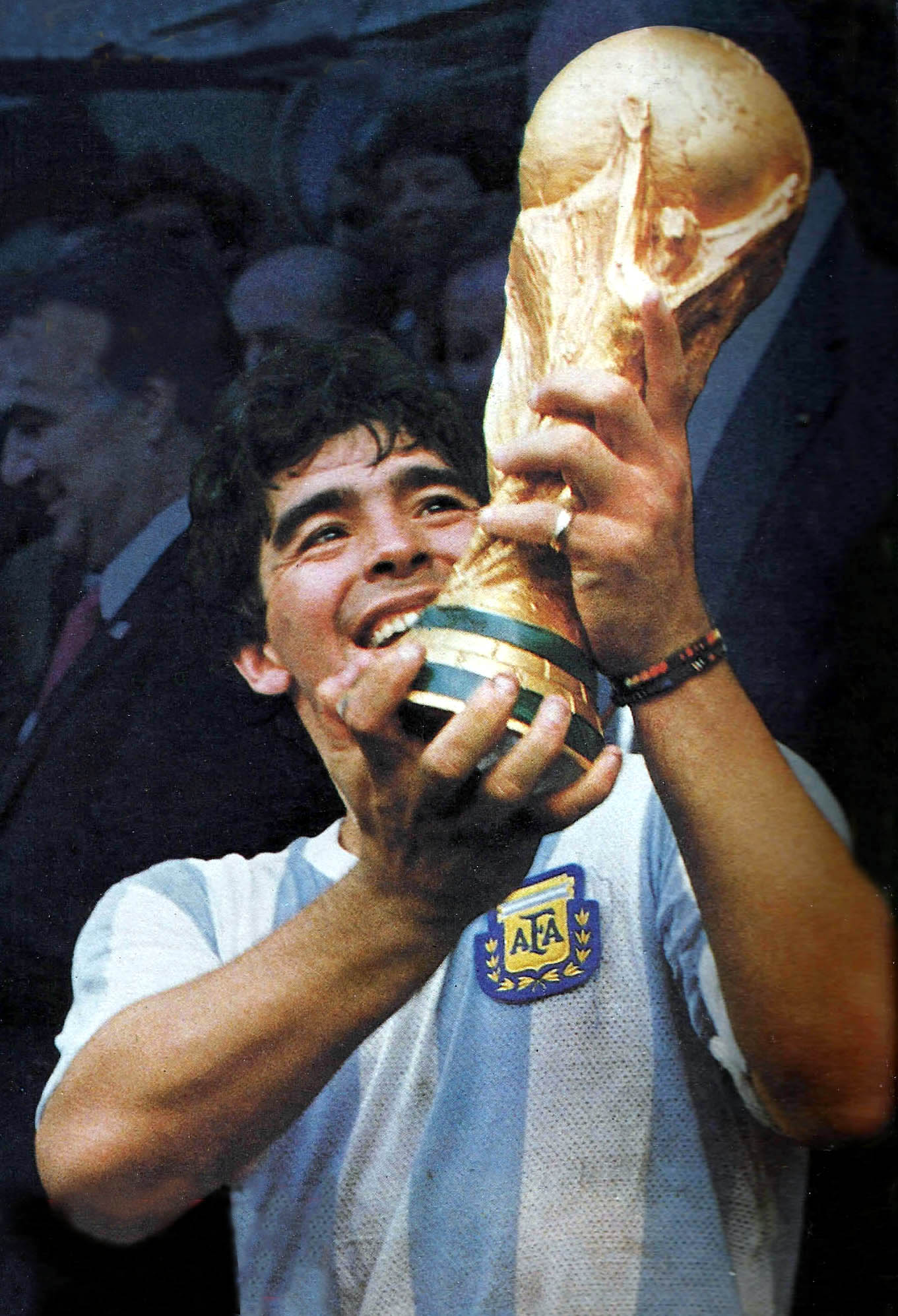
Diego Maradona

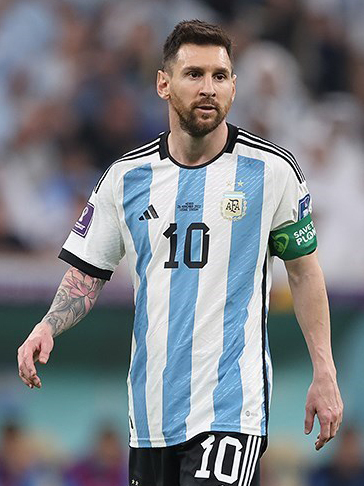
Lionel Andrés Messi

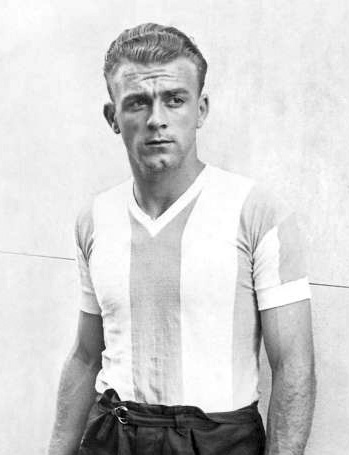
Alfredo Di Stéfano

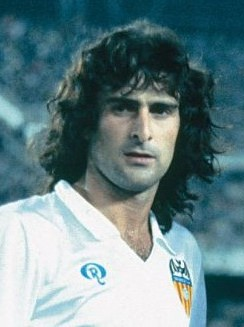
Mario Kempes

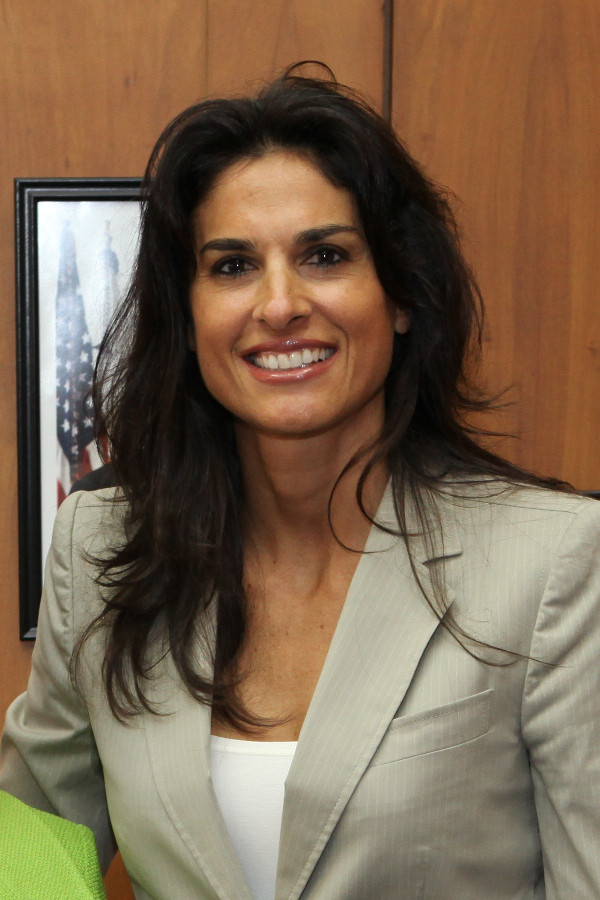
Gabriela Sabatini

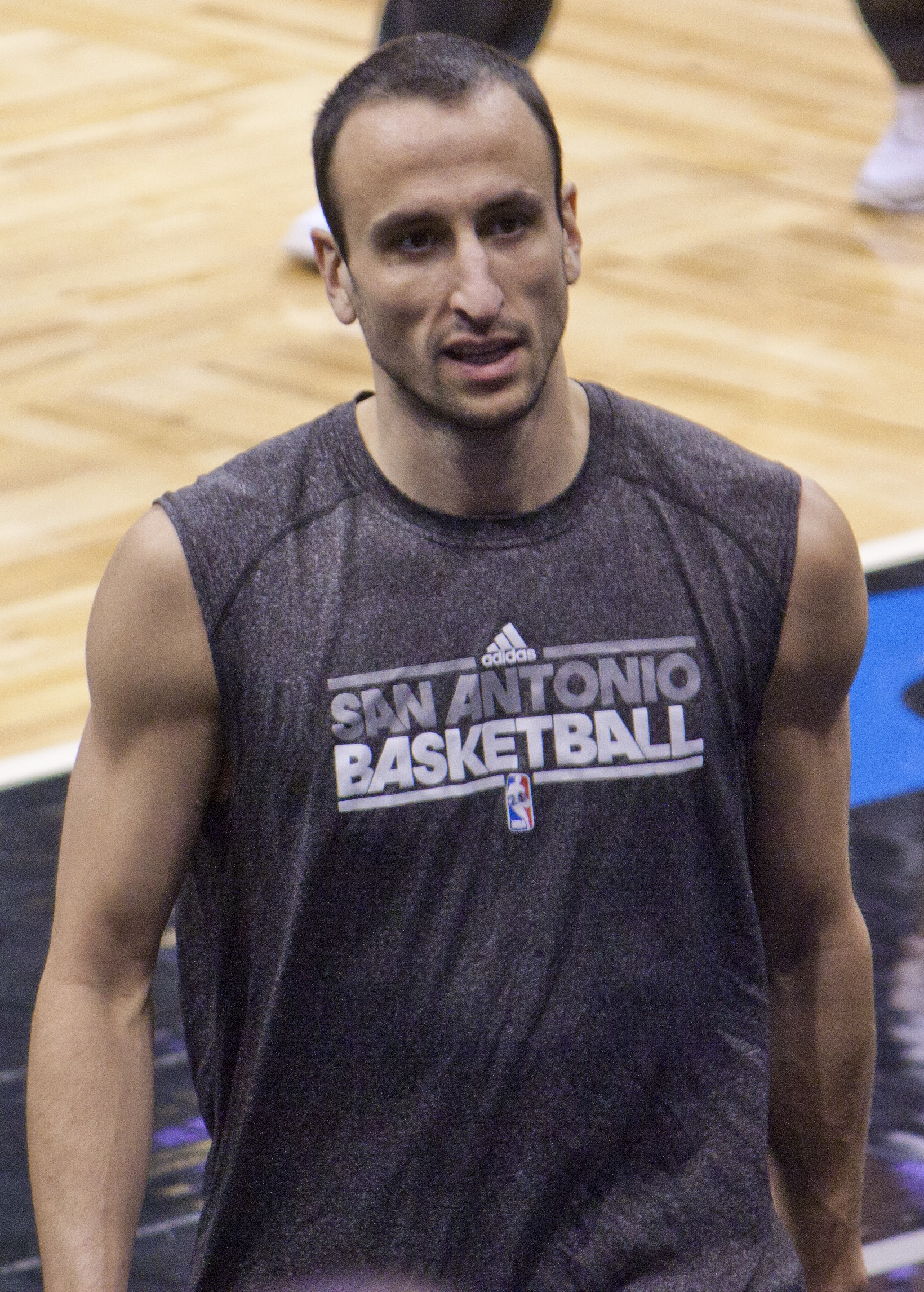
Manu Ginóbili

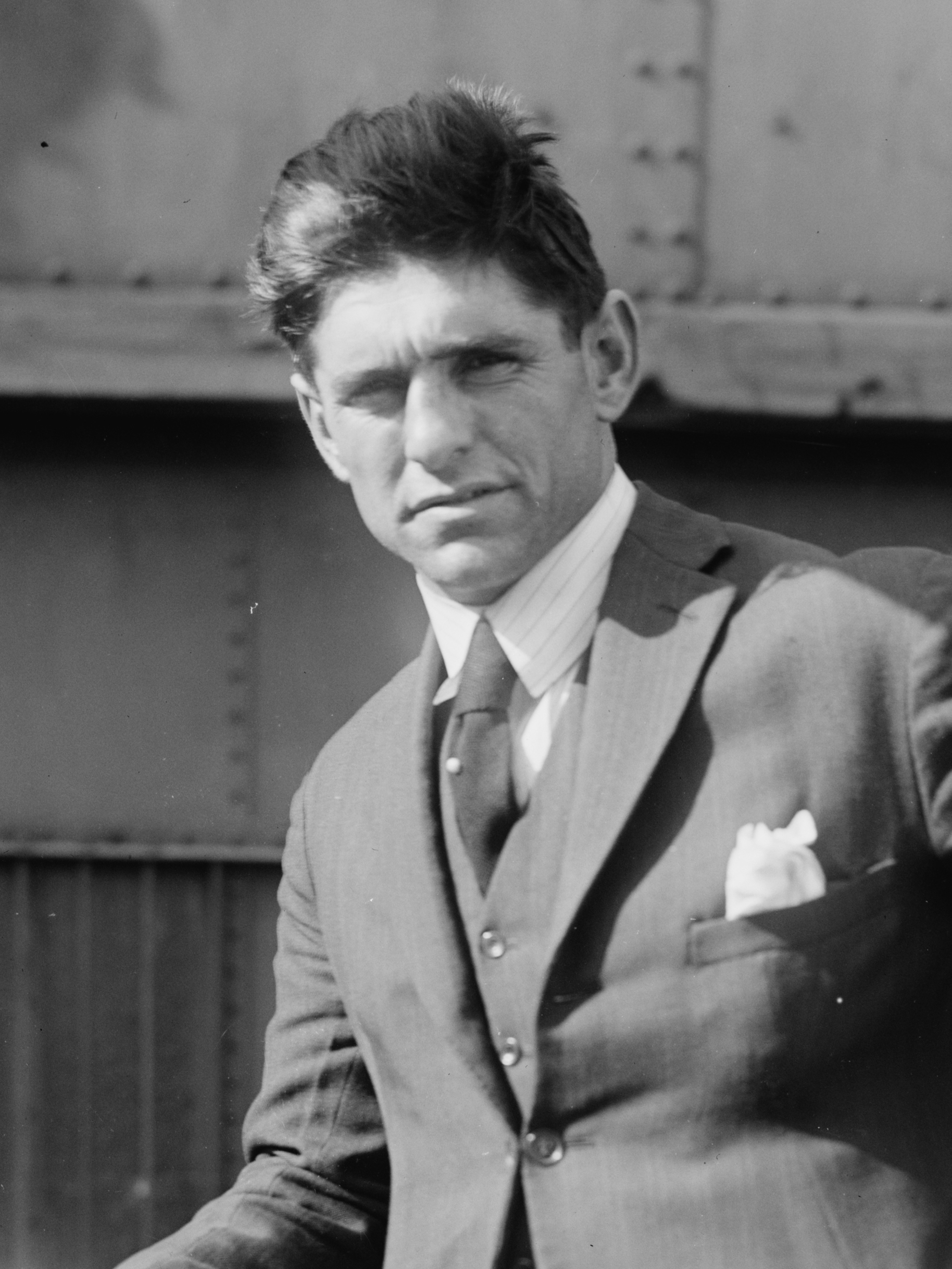
Luis Ángel Firpo

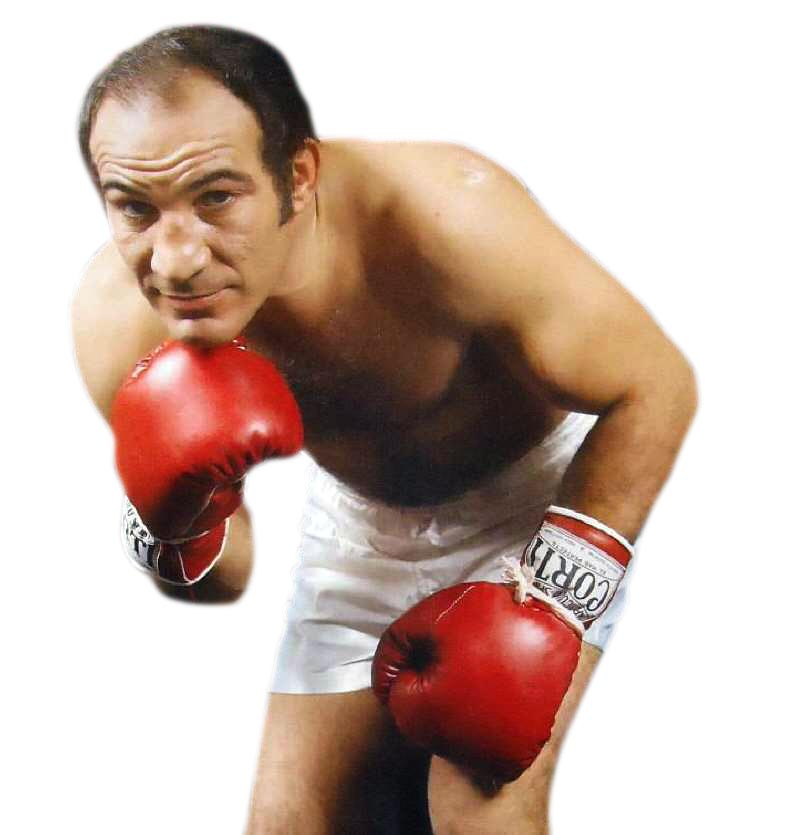
Nicolino Locche

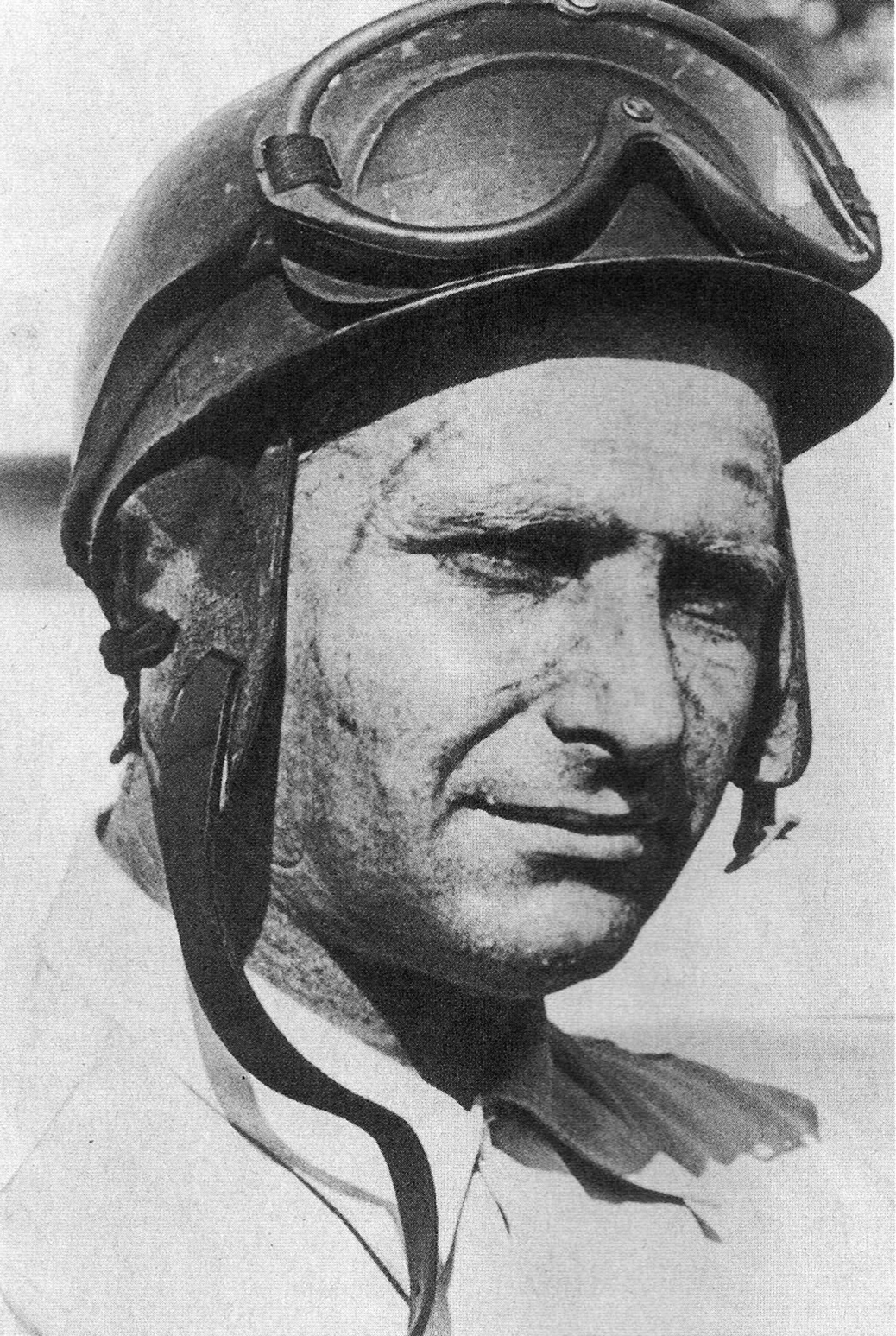
Juan Manuel Fangio

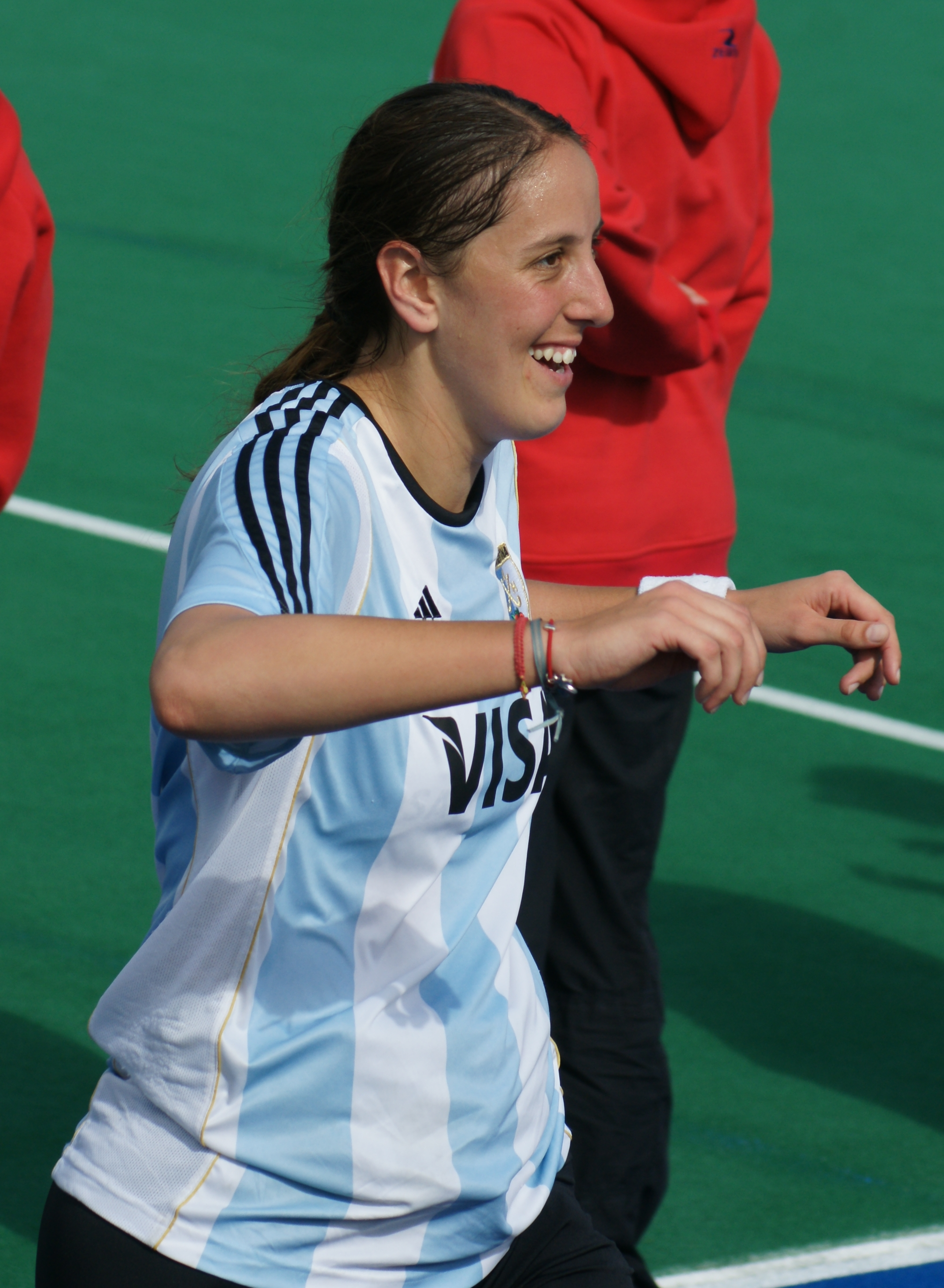
María Belén Succi

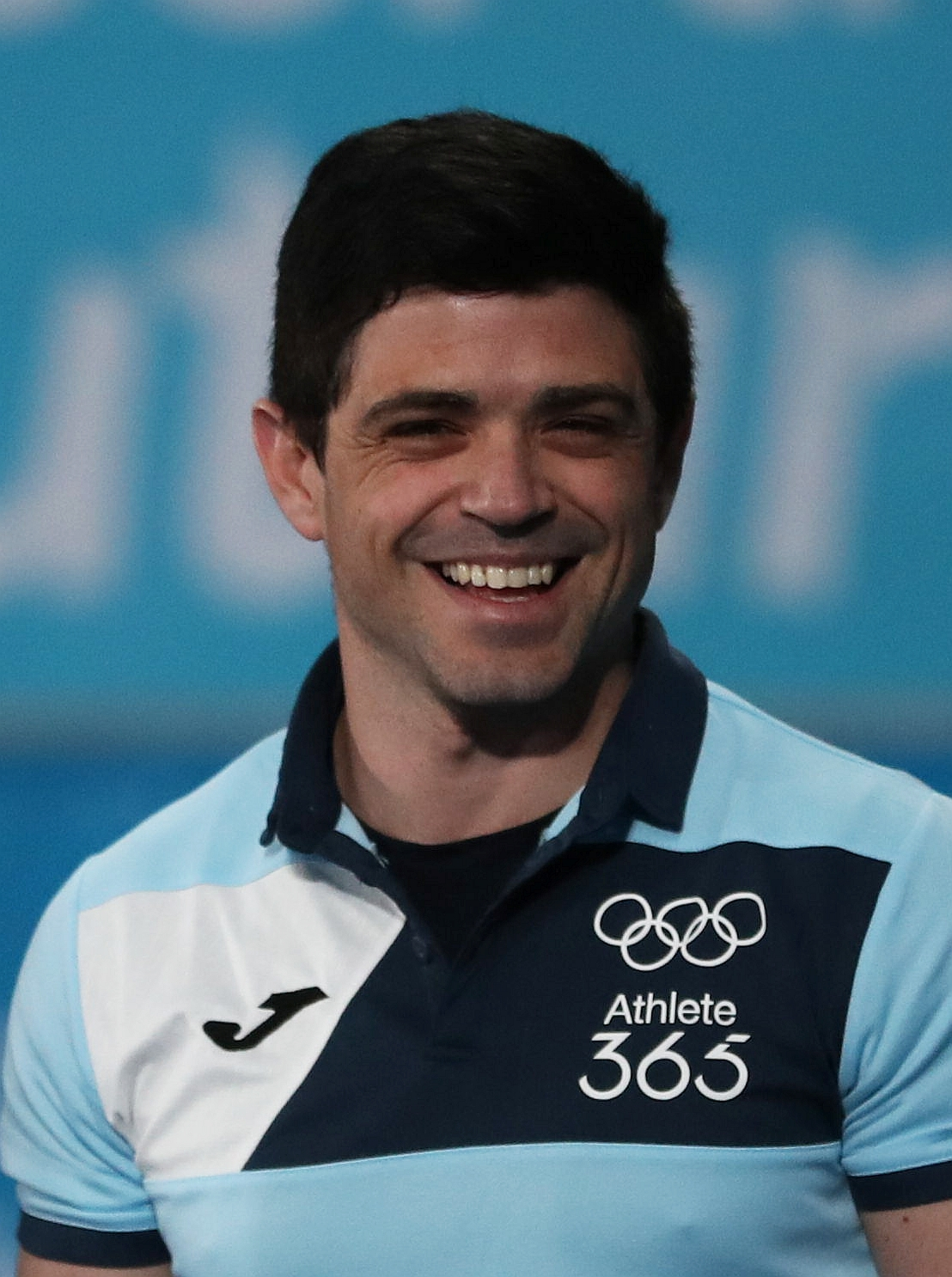
Federico Molinari

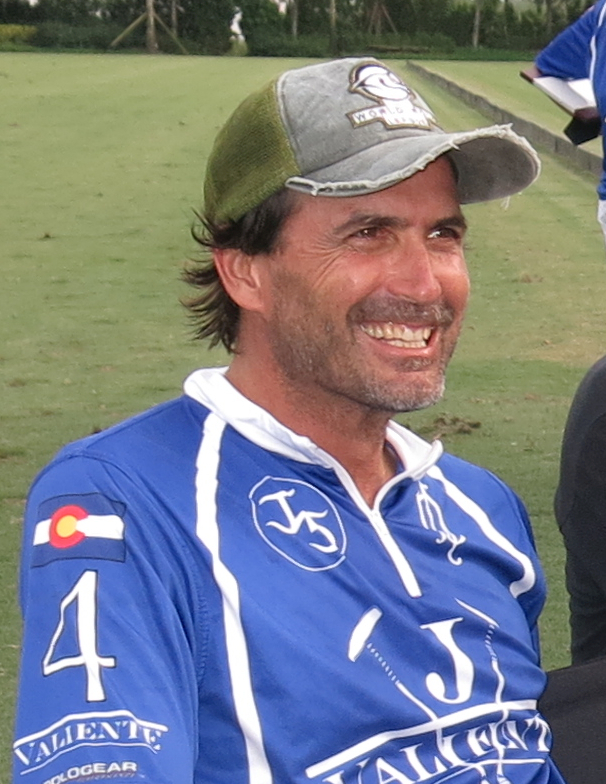
Adolfo Cambiaso

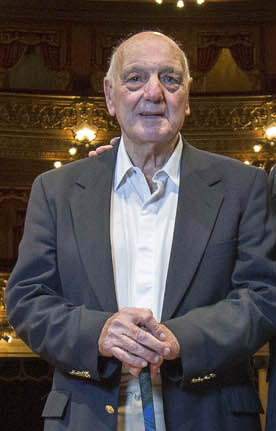
Roberto De Vicenzo

- Juan Manuel Cerúndolo , tennis player
- Roberto Abbondanzieri, footballer
- José Acasuso, tennis player
- José Acciari, footballer
- Agustina Albertario, field hockey player
- Matías Alemanno, rugby union player
- Leonel Altobelli, footballer
- Gabriel Amato, footballer
- Víctor Hugo Amatti, footballer
- Horacio Accavallo, boxer
- Antonio Angelillo, footballer
- Cristian Ansaldi, footballer
- Juan Antonini, footballer
- Tomás Argento, field hockey player
- Franco Armani, footballer
- Leandro Armani, footballer
- Mariano Armentano, footballer
- Roberto Ayala, footballer
- Leandro Baccaro, field hockey player
- Tomás Badaloni, footballer
- Facundo Bagnis, tennis player
- Horacio Raúl Baldessari, footballer
- Estefanía Banini, football player
- Mariano Barbosa, footballer
- Enzo Barrenechea, footballer
- Guillermo Barros Schelotto, footballer and manager
- Gustavo Barros Schelotto, footballer and manager
- Alfio Basile, football coach
- Roberto Basílico, footballer
- Oscar Basso, footballer
- Pablo Bastianini, footballer
- Damián Batallini, footballer
- Gabriel Batistuta, footballer
- Sebastián Battaglia, footballer
- Cristian Battocchio, footballer
- Elias Bazzi, footballer
- Luciano Becchio, footballer
- Carlos Bechtholdt Bazzano, footballer
- Amelia Belotti, handball player
- Darío Benedetto, footballer
- Eduardo Berizzo, footballer and coach
- Lucas Bernardi, footballer
- Attilio Bernasconi, footballer
- Sergio Berti, footballer
- Daniel Bertoni, footballer
- Lucas Besozzi, footballer
- Juan Betinotti, footballer
- Gonzalo Bettini, footballer
- Claudio Biaggio, footballer
- Bruno Bianchi, footballer
- Carlos Bianchi, footballer
- Valeria Bianchi, handball player
- Emanuel Biancucchi, footballer
- Maxi Biancucchi, footballer
- Ludovico Bidoglio, footballer
- Marcelo Bielsa, football coach
- Lucas Biglia, footballer
- Carlos Bilardo, football coach
- Dan Biocchi, athlete
- Mariano Bíttolo, footballer
- Ricardo Bochini, footballer
- José Luis Boffi, footballer
- Mario Bolatti, footballer
- Enrique Bologna, footballer
- Oscar Bonavena, boxer
- Iván Borghello, footballer
- Claudio Borghi, football coach
- Ángel Bossio, footballer
- Juan Botasso, footballer
- Jonathan Bottinelli, footballer
- Elmo Bovio, footballer
- Luis Brunetto, athlete
- Ezequiel Bullaude, footballer
- Facundo Buonanotte, footballer
- Guillermo Burdisso, footballer
- Nicolás Burdisso, footballer
- Jeremías Caggiano, footballer
- Diego Cagna, footballer
- Lucas Calabrese, sailor
- Pablo Calandria, footballer
- Agustín Calleri, tennis player
- Jonathan Calleri, footballer
- Facundo Callioni, field hockey player
- Pedro Calomino, footballer
- José María Calvo, footballer
- Adolfo Cambiaso, polo player
- Esteban Cambiasso, footballer
- Nicolás Cambiasso, footballer
- Julián Camino, footballer
- Lucas Cammareri, field hockey player
- Matías Cammareri, field hockey player
- Mauro Camoranesi, footballer.
- Hugo Campagnaro, footballer
- Gustavo Campagnuolo, footballer
- Facundo Campazzo, basketball player
- Rocio Campigli, handball player
- Gonzalo Canale, rugby union player
- Claudio Caniggia, footballer
- Vicente Cantatore, footballer
- Salvador Capitano, football coach
- Roberto Capparelli, footballer
- Santiago Capurro, field hockey player
- Franco Caraccio, footballer
- Ezequiel Alejo Carboni, footballer
- Martín Cardetti, footballer
- César Carignano, footballer
- Luis Alberto Carranza, footballer
- Juan Pablo Carrizo, footballer
- Federico Cartabia, footballer
- Leandro Caruso, footballer
- Damián Casalinuovo, footballer
- Raúl Alfredo Cascini, footballer
- Daniel Castellani, volleyball coach
- Iván Castellani, volleyball player
- María Castelli, field hockey player
- Miguel Angel Castellini, boxer
- Yael Castiglione, volleyball player
- Martin Castrogiovanni, rugby union player
- Lucas Castromán, footballer
- Martina Cavallero, field hockey player
- Bruno Cerella, basketball player
- Alberto Cerioni, footballer
- Renato Cesarini, footballer
- Roberto Cherro, footballer
- Germán Chiaraviglio, pole vaulter
- Valeria Chiaraviglio, pole vaulter
- Diego Chiodo, field hockey player
- Alberto Chividini, footballer
- Nicolas Cinalli, footballer
- Luciano Cingolani, footballer
- Ezequiel Cirigliano, footballer
- Renato Civelli, footballer
- Sebastián Cobelli, footballer
- Juan Martín Coggi, boxer
- Franco Colapinto, car racer
- Roberto Colautti, footballer
- Andrea Collarini, tennis player
- Fabricio Coloccini, footballer
- María Colombo, field hockey player
- Nazareno Colombo, footballer
- Juan Pablo Compagnucci, footballer
- Facundo Conte, volleyball player
- Hugo Conte, volleyball coach
- Felipe Contepomi, rugby union player
- Raúl Conti, footballer
- Enzo Copetti, footballer
- Julio Cozzi, footballer
- Hernán Crespo, footballer
- Victoria Crivelli, handball player
- Tomás Cubelli, rugby union player
- Patricio Cucchi, footballer
- José Luis Cuciuffo, footballer
- Matías Claudio Cuffa, footballer
- Juan Cuminetti, volleyball player
- Héctor Cúper, football coach
- Julio Curatella, rower
- Silvina D'Elía, field hockey player
- Roberto De Vicenzo, golf
- Carlos Delfino, basketball player
- Martín Demichelis, footballer
- José Devecchi, footballer
- Rodrigo De Paul, footballer
- Marco Di Cesare, footballer
- Ángel Di María, footballer
- Alfredo Di Stéfano, footballer
- Paulo Dybala, footballer
- Miguel Ángel Falasca, volleyball player and coach
- Juan Manuel Fangio, car racer
- Brian Farioli, footballer
- Federico Fazio, footballer
- Enzo Fernández, footballer
- Franco Ferrari, footballer
- Gianluca Ferrari, footballer
- Paulo Ferrari, footballer
- Héctor Fértoli, footballer
- Luis Ángel Firpo, boxer
- Fernando Forestieri, footballer
- Ricardo Gareca, footballer and manager
- Ignacio Gariglio, footballer
- Federico Gattoni, footballer
- Paulo Gazzaniga, footballer
- Francisco Gerometta, footballer
- Lautaro Gianetti, footballer
- Manu Ginóbili, basketball player
- Federico Girotti, footballer
- Gonzalo Goñi, footballer
- Gabriel Graciani, footballer
- Mauro Icardi, footballer
- Mario Kempes, footballer
- Hernán Lamberti, footballer
- Manuel Lanzini, footballer
- Nicolás Laprovíttola, basketball player
- Carlo Lattanzio, footballer
- Ezequiel Lavezzi, footballer
- Ricardo La Volpe, footballer
- Francesco Lo Celso, footballer
- Giovani Lo Celso, footballer
- Marcelo Loffreda, rugby union player
- Nicolino Locche, boxer
- Augusto Lotti, footballer
- Cristian Lucchetti, footballer
- Rosario Luchetti, field hockey player
- Alexis Mac Allister, footballer
- Sofía Maccari, field hockey player
- Julián Malatini, footballer
- Diego Maradona, footballer
- Tomás Marchiori, footballer
- Alan Marinelli, footballer
- Alejandro Martinuccio, footballer
- Gonzalo Maroni, footballer
- Emiliano Martinez, footballer
- Gerardo Martino, footballer and manager
- Javier Mascherano, footballer
- Humberto Maschio, footballer
- Gastón Mazzacane, car racer
- César Luis Menotti, football coach
- Delfina Merino, field hockey player
- Lionel Messi, footballer
- Nicolás Messiniti, footballer
- Gonzalo Miceli, footballer
- Diego Milito, footballer
- Gabriel Milito, footballer
- Federico Molinari, artistic gymnast
- Fernando Monetti, footballer
- Alejandro Montecchia, basketball player
- Luis Monti, footballer
- Antonio Napolitano, footballer
- Juan Ignacio Nardoni, footballer
- Andrés Nocioni, basketball player
- Fabricio Oberto, basketball player
- Vanina Oneto, field hockey player
- Raimondo Orsi, footballer
- Nicolás Orsini, footballer
- Dani Osvaldo, footballer
- Nicolás Otamendi, footballer
- Juan Ignacio Pacchini, footballer
- Martin Palermo, footballer
- Paula Pareto, judoka
- Pedro Pasculli, footballer
- Daniel Passarella, footballer
- Lucas Passerini, footballer
- Javier Pastore, footballer
- Agustín Pastorelli, footballer
- Nicolás Pasquini, footballer
- Mauricio Pellegrino, footballer
- Roberto Pereyra, footballer
- Diego Perotti, footballer
- Germán Pezzella, footballer
- Ignacio Piatti, footballer
- Santiago Pierotti, footballer
- Mauricio Pochettino, footballer and manager
- Tomás Pochettino, footballer
- Pablo Prigioni, basketball player
- Carla Rebecchi, field hockey player
- Mateo Retegui, footballer
- Antonino Rocca, wrestler
- Cecilia Rognoni, field hockey player
- Leandro Romagnoli, footballer
- Agustín Rossi, footballer
- Oscar Ruggeri, footballer
- Gabriela Sabatini, tennis player
- Alejandro Sabella, footballer and manager
- Javier Saviola, footballer
- Lionel Scaloni, footballer and manager
- Mariela Scarone, field hockey player
- Ezequiel Schelotto, footballer
- Luis Scola, basketball player
- Hugo Sconochini, basketball player
- Roberto Sensini, footballer
- Marcos Senesi, footballer
- Diego Simeone, football coach
- Gianluca Simeone, footballer
- Giovanni Simeone, footballer
- Giuliano Simeone, footballer
- Omar Sívori, footballer
- Santiago Solari, footballer
- Julián Speroni, footballer
- Guillermo Stradella, footballer
- Belén Succi, field hockey player
- Nicolás Tagliafico, footballer
- Alberto Tarantini, footballer
- Renzo Tesuri, footballer
- Diego Valeri, footballer
- Manuel Vicentini, footballer
- Javier Zanetti, footballer
- Mauro Zárate, footballer
- Marcelo Barticciotto, Naturalised Chilean Footballer born in Argentina

=== Writers ===
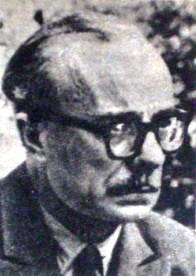
Ernesto Sabato

- Orlando Barone, writer and journalist
- Hector Bianciotti, novelist
- Enrique Breccia, comic artist
- Susana Calandrelli, poet
- María Luisa Carnelli, writer and poet
- Oscar Conti, humorist
- Pascual Contursi, poet
- Roberto Cossa, playwright
- Quirino Cristiani, cartoonist
- Josefina Passadori, writer
- Ricardo Piglia, writer
- Syria Poletti, writer
- Manuel Puig, writer
- Ernesto Sabato, writer, painter, and physicist
- Juan Jose Sebreli, sociologist, essayist, and writer
- Aurora Venturini, writer

== See also ==
- Argentina–Italy relations
- Demographics of Argentina
- French Argentines
- German Argentines
- Immigration in Argentina
- Spanish Argentines

== Sources ==
- Foerster, Robert F. (1919). The Italian emigration of our times. Cambridge: Harvard University Press.
