= Paula Oliveto =

Argentine lawyer and politician

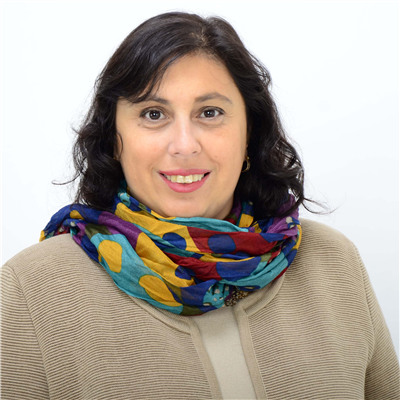

National Deputy
- Incumbent
- Assumed office 10 December 2017
- Constituency: City of Buenos Aires

President of Civic Coalition ARI
- Incumbent
- Assumed office 25 October 2016
- Preceded by: Maximiliano Ferraro

Legislator of the City of Buenos Aires
- In office 10 December 2013 – 10 December 2017

Auditor of the City of Buenos Aires
- In office 20 December 2007 – 1 July 2013

Personal details
- Born: Paula Mariana Oliveto Lago; 10 February 1973 (age 53) Mataderos, Buenos Aires, Argentina
- Party: Civic Coalition ARI
- Other political affiliations: Cambiemos; Vamos Juntos
- Education: University of Buenos Aires
- Occupation: Lawyer, politician
- Website: paulaolivetolago.com.ar

Paula Mariana Oliveto Lago (born 10 February 1973) is an Argentine lawyer and politician. She is currently a member of the national Chamber of Deputies elected in the city of Buenos Aires for the 2021–2025 term. She is also president of Civic Coalition ARI (CC-ARI).

== Early life and career ==
Paula Oliveto was born in Buenos Aires on 10 February 1973, (Note: Her official page on the Chamber of Deputies website lists her birthdate as 31 December 1969.) where she attended primary and secondary school. She studied law at the University of Buenos Aires, graduating in 1997, and specialized in state financial administration at the Argentine Budget Association.

=== Pre-political work ===
She directed the Pluralist Foundation's Lisandro de la Torre Center for Transparency in Public and Private Management from 2004 to 2007, and was an auditor of the city of Buenos Aires from 2007 to 2013. In the latter year, she was elected legislator.

=== Legislator of the City of Buenos Aires (2013–2017) ===
Oliveto was elected to the Buenos Aires City Legislature in September 2013, and took office on 10 December. In July 2017, as the president of the CC-ARI bloc, together with the PRO and Confianza Pública blocs, she formed the Vamos Juntos Interbloc, creating a majority in the legislature.

This bloc brought accusations against various politicians and businessmen of Cristina Kirchner's government.

Oliveto was vice president of the Security Commission, and a voting member of the following commissions:

- Board of Ethics, Agreements, and Control Bodies
- Budget, Finance, Financial Administration, and Tax Policy
- Economic Development, Mercosur, and Employment Policy
- Justice

=== National deputy ===
Oliveto became president of CC-ARI on 25 October 2016. On 10 December 2017, she became a member of the Chamber of Deputies representing the city of Buenos Aires.

== Fishy contributors scandal ==
Paula Oliveto was involved in events which came to light in July 2018, related to private contributions for the 2015 general and the 2017 legislative elections. This became known as the fishy contributors scandal (Spanish: escándalo de aportantes truchos).

The journalistic portal El Destape obtained access to a document that proved that Horacio Rodríguez Larreta's administration had set up a scheme to take money from the government of Buenos Aires and funnel it to Elisa Carrió's campaign.

Through resolution No. 91, the Buenos Aires government had decided to allocate remuneration units – that is, an extra salary supplement that is given in exceptional cases – to some 22 public employees in different areas. The amounts to be delivered ranged from 10,000 to 120,000 pesos. But just three months later, according to the National Electoral Chamber, all of the recipients made donations to Elisa Carrió's campaign. These all took place on the same day, in the same amount, and in the same form: 25,000 pesos in cash, thus totaling 300,000 pesos (18,113 US dollars).

People came forward who denied having made financial contributions: from school counselors and retirees to city councilors. The victims expressed "fear of a possible loss of employment if their names are made known to public opinion." They worked for entities including the Federal Public Revenue Agency (AFIP), the security forces, and the City of Buenos Aires. Employees of the government of Buenos Aires, "said they were victims of the crime of identity theft," as they appeared as private contributors for the 2015 election campaign, "but also for the Cambiemos Buenos Aires alliance in 2017 and the Vamos Juntos political alliance also in 2017, and which led to the candidates Elisa Carrió and María del Carmen Polledo becoming deputies." Employees claimed to know of "a mechanism implemented repeatedly over time" to introduce illegal money and/or public funds to finance several of Carrió's campaigns. In this mechanism, according to the complaint, the city employees' personal data was falsely introduced, and the officials responsible for the different ministerial areas were listed as contributors.

Osvaldo Marasco, former Cambiemos candidate for mayor of Ituzaingó in the 2015 elections, maintained that Oliveto had proven knowledge of the existence of suspicious contributions in Macrist electoral campaigns, but that she avoided denouncing the maneuver before the judiciary. Marasco added "I had gone through people from the ARI who were on my list – they told Carrió and Paula Olivetto, and they said: 'With this we can do nothing.'" He also involved María Eugenia Vidal in his statements. According to Marasco, the maneuver originated with "the Capital boys", who had since become second-tier or third-tier directors and officials, "blocs" for the gnocchi of the Buenos Aires government, with contracts. "The campaign was banked with silver from the Federal Capital and there was María Eugenia Vidal, I was at the lunches. At that time they were (Horacio Rodríguez) Larreta, (Diego) Santilli, Rogelio Frigerio, Durán Barba, (Edgardo) Cenzón, who was fundamental because he handled the money." He received threats after making these statements.

== Implication in political espionage case ==
The Parlasur deputy Eduardo Valdés denounced Elisa Carrió, Oliveto, and Mariana Zuvic to the judiciary for violation of the Intelligence Law, violation of secrecy, aggravated cover-up, slander, and false denunciation. Valdés said that in the framework of the D'Alessio scandal, "the deputies of the Civic Coalition used transcriptions of illegal eavesdropping in the Ezeiza prison", and that "they wanted to take responsibility for instigating the complaint against Stornelli." In that sense, he said he was "certain that Marcelo D'Alessio was handed over to Oliveto", and recalled that "Oliveto herself acknowledged having spoken with the extortionist and spy after having been raided by Judge Alejo Ramos Padilla." Thus, the disputed "used illegal material" to organize a press campaign "to curb and muddy the investigation of Ramos Padilla," so that for Valdés "they acted as covert agents of D'Alessio and his band."

In early April, Ernesto Barreiro, a former spy from the Federal Intelligence Agency (AFI) and right-hand man of Marcelo D'Alessio, was a fugitive. After his arrest, he was taken to testify before the judge in the case, where he showed messages and calls to Civic Coalition deputy Paula Oliveto. He said he knew that they met regularly and even that she also had several meetings in the National Congress with Cambiemos deputy Elisa Carrió. He said that deputies asked D'Alessio for information, and that the false lawyer provided them with facts obtained from illegal espionage about opposition leaders.

As a result of these events, the FpV-PJ bloc of deputies requested that legislators Elisa Carrió and Paula Oliveto be removed from the National Congress, "due to moral incapacity arising in the exercise of their functions." The draft resolution was formally presented on 21 March 2019.
