= List of Argentine deputies, 2011–2013 =

This is list of members of the Argentine Chamber of Deputies from 10 December 2011 to 9 December 2013.

== Composition ==
=== By province ===
Province	Deputies	Population (2010)
Buenos Aires	70	15,625,084
Buenos Aires City	25	2,890,151
Catamarca	5	367,828
Chaco	7	1,053,466
Chubut	5	506,668
Córdoba	18	3,304,825
Corrientes	7	993,338
Entre Ríos	9	1,236,300
Formosa	5	527,895
Jujuy	6	672,260
La Pampa	5	316,940
La Rioja	5	331,847
Mendoza	10	1,741,610
Misiones	7	1,097,829
Neuquén	5	550,334
Río Negro	5	633,374
Salta	7	1,215,207
San Juan	6	680,427
San Luis	5	431,588
Santa Cruz	5	272,524
Santa Fe	19	3,200,736
Santiago del Estero	7	896,461
Tierra del Fuego	5	126,190
Tucumán	9	1,448,200

=== By political groups ===
as of 9 December 2013

Bloc	Seats	Leader
Front for Victory–PJ	115	Juliana Di Tullio
Radical Civic Union	40	Mario Negri
Peronist Front	20	Enrique Luis Thomas
PRO	11	Federico Pinedo
Civic Front for Santiago	7	Daniel Agustín Brue
Civic Coalition ARI	6	Alfonso Prat-Gay
Socialist Party	6	Juan Carlos Zabalza
Civic Front of Córdoba	5	Ernesto Félix Martínez
New Encounter	5	Carlos Heller
Popular Unity	5	Claudio Lozano
GEN	4	Margarita Stolbizer
Peronist Unity	3	Felipe Solá
Project South Movement	3	Pino Solanas
Neuquén People's Movement	3	Alicia Marcela Comelli
La Pampa Justicialist Party	2	Roberto Ricardo Robledo
Federal Córdoba	2	Francisco José Fortuna
Democratic Party of Mendoza	2	Omar De Marchi
Civic and Social Front of Catamarca	2	Mariana Alejandra Veaute
Single-member blocs	16	—N/a
Source: hcdn.gov.ar (archived)

== Election cycles ==
Election	Term	
Election	Start	End
2009	10 December 2009	9 December 2013
2011	10 December 2011	9 December 2015

== List of Deputies ==
Province	Deputy	Party	Term	
Province	Deputy	Party	From	To
Buenos Aires	Ricardo Luis Alfonsín	Radical Civic Union	2009	2013
Buenos Aires	Eduardo Pablo Amadeo	Peronist Front	2009	2013
Buenos Aires	Andrés Roberto Arregui	Front for Victory–PJ	2011	2015
Buenos Aires	Alberto Emilio Asseff	Peronist Front	2011	2015
Buenos Aires	Alfredo Néstor Atanasof	Peronist Front	2009	2013
Buenos Aires	María Ester Balcedo	Front for Victory–PJ	2011	2015
Buenos Aires	Miguel Ángel Bazze	Radical Civic Union	2011	2015
Buenos Aires	Gloria Mercedes Bidegain	Front for Victory–PJ	2011	2015
Buenos Aires	Carlos Ramón Brown	Peronist Front	2011	2015
Buenos Aires	Eric Calcagno y Maillmann	Front for Victory–PJ	2011	2015
Buenos Aires	Graciela Camaño	Peronist Front	2011	2015
Buenos Aires	Remo Gerardo Carlotto	Front for Victory–PJ	2009	2013
Buenos Aires	Luis Francisco Jorge Cicogna	Front for Victory–PJ	2009	2013
Buenos Aires	Diana Beatriz Conti	Front for Victory–PJ	2009	2013
Buenos Aires	Ricardo Oscar Cuccovillo	Socialist Party	2011	2015
Buenos Aires	Víctor Norberto De Gennaro	Popular Unity	2011	2015
Buenos Aires	Francisco de Narváez	Peronist Front	2009	2013
Buenos Aires	Eduardo Enrique "Wado" de Pedro	Front for Victory–PJ	2011	2015 (Note: Resigned on 26 March 2015 to take office as General Secretary of Presidency.)
Buenos Aires	Edgardo Fernando Depetri	Front for Victory–PJ	2010 (Note: Since 3 November 2010. Replaced Néstor Kirchner.)	2013
Buenos Aires	Juliana Di Tullio	Front for Victory–PJ	2009	2013
Buenos Aires	José María Díaz Bancalari	Front for Victory–PJ	2011	2015
Buenos Aires	Julián Andrés Domínguez	Front for Victory–PJ	2011	2015
Buenos Aires	Victoria Analía Donda Pérez	Freemen of the South	2011	2015
Buenos Aires	Omar Arnaldo Duclos	GEN	2011	2015
Buenos Aires	Gustavo Alfredo Horacio Ferrari	Peronist Front	2009	2013
Buenos Aires	Natalia Gambaro	Peronist Front	2009	2013
Buenos Aires	Andrea Fabiana García	Front for Victory–PJ	2011	2015
Buenos Aires	María Teresa García	Front for Victory–PJ	2009	2013
Buenos Aires	Carlos Enrique Gdansky	Front for Victory–PJ	2011	2015
Buenos Aires	Graciela María Giannettasio	Front for Victory–PJ	2011	2015
Buenos Aires	Gladys Esther González	PRO	2009	2013
Buenos Aires	Dulce Granados	Front for Victory–PJ	2009	2013
Buenos Aires	Leonardo Grosso	Front for Victory–PJ	2011	2015
Buenos Aires	Gastón Harispe	New Encounter	2011	2015
Buenos Aires	Nora Graciela Iturraspe	Popular Unity	2009	2013
Buenos Aires	Carlos Miguel Kunkel	Front for Victory–PJ	2009	2013
Buenos Aires	Jorge Alberto Landau	Front for Victory–PJ	2011	2015
Buenos Aires	Julio Rubén Ledesma	Federal Current of Thought	2009	2013
Buenos Aires	María Virginia Linares	GEN	2011	2015
Buenos Aires	Silvia Cristina Majdalani	PRO	2009	2013
Buenos Aires	Soledad Martínez	PRO	2009	2013
Buenos Aires	Mayra Soledad Mendoza	Front for Victory–PJ	2011	2015
Buenos Aires	Gerardo Fabián Milman	GEN	2009	2013
Buenos Aires	Carlos Julio Moreno	Front for Victory–PJ	2009	2013
Buenos Aires	Roberto Mario Mouilleron	Peronist Front	2009	2013
Buenos Aires	Juan Facundo Moyano	Front for Victory–PJ	2011	2015
Buenos Aires	Mabel Hilda Müller	Front for Victory–PJ	2011 (Note: Since 10 December 2011. Replaced Mariano Federico West.)	2013
Buenos Aires	María Graciela Ocaña	Union for Social Development and Equity	2011	2013 (Note: Resigned on 10 December 2013 to become a member of the Buenos Aires City Legislature. Replaced by Laura Esper.)
Buenos Aires	Mario Néstor Oporto	Front for Victory–PJ	2011	2015
Buenos Aires	Héctor Horacio Piemonte	Civic Coalition ARI	2009	2013
Buenos Aires	Horacio Pietragalla Corti	Front for Victory–PJ	2011	2015
Buenos Aires	Francisco Omar Plaini	Culture, Education and Labour	2009	2013
Buenos Aires	Ramona Pucheta	MIJD Socialist	2011	2015
Buenos Aires	Adriana Victoria Puiggrós	Front for Victory–PJ	2011	2015
Buenos Aires	Carlos Raimundi	New Encounter	2011	2015
Buenos Aires	Héctor Pedro Recalde	Front for Victory–PJ	2009	2013
Buenos Aires	Raúl Alberto Rivara	Peronist Union	2009	2013
Buenos Aires	Jorge Rivas	Front for Victory–PJ	2011	2015
Buenos Aires	Alberto Oscar Roberti	Peronist Renewal Front	2011	2015
Buenos Aires	Marcela Virginia Rodríguez	Egalitarian and Participative Democracy	2009	2013
Buenos Aires	Claudia Mónica Rucci	Peronist Front	2009	2013
Buenos Aires	Martín Sabbatella	New Encounter	2009	2013
Buenos Aires	Eduardo Santín	Radical Civic Union	2011	2015
Buenos Aires	Adela Rosa Segarra	Front for Victory–PJ	2011	2015
Buenos Aires	Felipe Carlos Solá	Peronist Union	2009	2013
Buenos Aires	Margarita Rosa Stolbizer	GEN	2009	2013
Buenos Aires	María Luisa Storani	Radical Civic Union	2009	2013
Buenos Aires	Juan Pedro Tunessi	Radical Civic Union	2009	2013
Buenos Aires	María Eugenia Zamarreño	Front for Victory–PJ	2011	2015
Buenos Aires City	Laura Alonso	PRO	2009	2013
Buenos Aires City	Alcira Susana Argumedo	Project South Movement	2009	2013
Buenos Aires City	María Paula Bertol	PRO	2009	2013
Buenos Aires City	María del Carmen Bianchi	Front for Victory–PJ	2011	2015
Buenos Aires City	Mara Brawer	Front for Victory–PJ	2011	2015
Buenos Aires City	Patricia Bullrich	PRO	2011	2015
Buenos Aires City	Jorge Justo Cardelli	Project South Movement	2009	2013
Buenos Aires City	Elisa María Avelina "Lilita" Carrió	Civic Coalition ARI	2009	2013
Buenos Aires City	Robert Vincent "Roy" Cortina	Socialist Party	2011	2015
Buenos Aires City	Alfonso Prat-Gay	Civic Coalition ARI	2009	2013
Buenos Aires City	Roberto José Feletti	Front for Victory–PJ	2011	2015
Buenos Aires City	Manuel Garrido	Radical Civic Union	2011	2015
Buenos Aires City	Ricardo Rodolfo Gil Lavedra	Radical Civic Union	2009	2013
Buenos Aires City	Carlos Salomón Heller	New Encounter	2009	2013
Buenos Aires City	Juan Carlos Isaac Junio	New Encounter	2011	2015
Buenos Aires City	Andrés "Cuervo" Larroque	Front for Victory–PJ	2011	2015
Buenos Aires City	Claudio Raúl Lozano	Popular Unity	2011	2015
Buenos Aires City	Marta Gabriela Michetti	PRO	2009	2013
Buenos Aires City	Julián Martín Obiglio	PRO	2010 (Note: Since 13 October 2010. Replaced Esteban Bullrich.)	2013
Buenos Aires City	Liliana Beatriz Parada	Popular Unity	2009	2013
Buenos Aires City	Federico Pinedo	PRO	2011	2015
Buenos Aires City	Cornelia Schmidt-Liermann	PRO	2011	2015
Buenos Aires City	Fernando Ezequiel "Pino" Solanas	Project South Movement	2009	2013
Buenos Aires City	Pablo Gabriel Tonelli	PRO	2011	2015
Buenos Aires City	Alberto Jorge Triaca	PRO	2009	2013
Catamarca	Pedro Omar Molas	Civic and Social Front of Catamarca	2010 (Note: Since 17 March 2010. Replaced Genaro Collantes.)	2013
Catamarca	Manuel Isauro Molina	Front for Victory–PJ	2011	2015
Catamarca	Marcia Sara María Ortiz Correa	Front for Victory–PJ	2011	2015
Catamarca	María Alejandra Veaute	Civic and Social Front of Catamarca	2009	2013
Catamarca	Rubén David Yazbek	Front for Victory–PJ	2009	2013
Chaco	Víctor Hugo Maldonado	Radical Civic Union	2011	2015
Chaco	Sandra Marcela Mendoza	Front for Victory–PJ	2009	2013
Chaco	José Ricardo Mongelo	Front for Victory–PJ	2011	2015
Chaco	Pablo Eduardo Orsolini	Radical Civic Union	2009	2013
Chaco	María Inés Pilatti Vergara	Front for Victory–PJ	2009	2013
Chaco	Gladys Beatriz Soto	Front for Victory–PJ	2011	2015
Chaco	Alicia Terada	Civic Coalition ARI	2009	2013
Chubut	Mónica Graciela Contrera	Front for Victory–PJ	2011	2015
Chubut	Oscar Rubén Currilén	Front for Victory–PJ	2009	2013
Chubut	Nancy Susana González	Front for Victory–PJ	2009	2013
Chubut	Juan Mario Pais	Front for Victory–PJ	2011	2015
Chubut	Cristina Isabel Ziebart	Front for Victory–PJ	2011	2015
Córdoba	Oscar Raúl Aguad	Radical Civic Union	2009	2013
Córdoba	Gumersindo Federico Alonso	Civic Front of Córdoba	2009	2013
Córdoba	Nora Esther Bedano	Front for Victory–PJ	2011	2015
Córdoba	Patricia de Ferrari Rueda	Radical Civic Union	2011	2015
Córdoba	Gladys Susana Espíndola	Radical Civic Union	2009	2013
Córdoba	Hipólito Faustinelli	Radical Civic Union	2009	2013
Córdoba	Francisco José Fortuna	Federal Córdoba	2009	2013
Córdoba	Fabián Marcelo Francioni	Front for Victory–PJ	2011	2015
Córdoba	Estela Ramona Garnero	Federal Córdoba	2009	2013
Córdoba	Daniel Oscar Giacomino	Front for Victory–PJ	2011	2015
Córdoba	Mónica Edith Gutiérrez	Front for Victory–PJ	2011	2015
Córdoba	Ernesto Félix Martínez	Civic Front of Córdoba	2009	2013
Córdoba	Susana del Valle Mazzarella	Civic Front of Córdoba	2009	2013
Córdoba	Edgar Raúl Müller	Peronist Front	2011	2015
Córdoba	Carmen Rosa Nebreda	Front for Victory–PJ	2009	2013
Córdoba	Mario Raúl Negri	Radical Civic Union	2011	2015
Córdoba	Jorge Anselmo Valinotto	Civic Front of Córdoba	2011	2015
Córdoba	Graciela Susana Villata	Civic Front of Córdoba	2011	2015
Corrientes	Lucio Bernardo Aspiazu	Radical Civic Union	2009	2013
Corrientes	María Elena Petrona Chieno	Front for Victory–PJ	2009	2013
Corrientes	Rodolfo Alfredo Fernández	Radical Civic Union	2009	2013
Corrientes	Araceli Ferreyra	Front for Victory–PJ	2011	2015
Corrientes	Ana María Perroni	Front for Victory–PJ	2011	2015
Corrientes	Agustín Alberto Portela	Radical Civic Union	2011	2015
Corrientes	Roberto Fabián Ríos	Front for Victory–PJ	2011	2013 (Note: Resigned on 10 December 2013 to become mayor of Corrientes. Replaced by Juan Fernando Marcopulos)
Entre Ríos	Raúl Enrique Barrandeguy	Front for Victory–PJ	2009	2013
Entre Ríos	Atilio Francisco Salvador Benedetti	Radical Civic Union	2009	2013
Entre Ríos	Jorge Omar Chemes	Radical Civic Union	2009	2013
Entre Ríos	María Cristina Cremer de Busti	Peronist Front	2009	2013
Entre Ríos	Osvaldo Enrique Elorriaga	Front for Victory–PJ	2011	2015
Entre Ríos	Hilma Leonor Ré	Civic Coalition ARI	2009	2013
Entre Ríos	Liliana María Ríos	Front for Victory–PJ	2011	2015
Entre Ríos	Fabián Dulio Rogel	Radical Civic Union	2011	2015
Entre Ríos	Julio Rodolfo Solanas	Front for Victory–PJ	2011	2015
Formosa	Luis Eugenio Basterra	Front for Victory–PJ	2011	2015
Formosa	Ricardo Buryaile	Radical Civic Union	2009	2013
Formosa	Juan Carlos Díaz Roig	Front for Victory–PJ	2009	2013
Formosa	Carlos Guillermo Donkin	Front for Victory–PJ	2011	2015
Formosa	Inés Beatriz Lotto	Front for Victory–PJ	2011	2015
Jujuy	María Eugenia Bernal	Front for Victory–PJ	2009	2013
Jujuy	Mario Raymundo Fiad	Radical Civic Union	2009	2013
Jujuy	Miguel Ángel Giubergia	Radical Civic Union	2011	2015 (Note: Resigned on 28 May 2015 to become a representative before the Federal Authority of Information and Communication Technologies. Replaced by María Cristina Fernández Blanco.)
Jujuy	Ermindo Edgardo Marcelo Llanos	Front for Victory–PJ	2009	2013
Jujuy	Mariela Ortiz	Front for Victory–PJ	2011	2015
Jujuy	Rubén Armando Rivarola	Front for Victory–PJ	2011	2015
La Pampa	María Luz Alonso	Front for Victory–PJ	2011	2015
La Pampa	Ulises Umberto José Forte	Radical Civic Union	2009	2013
La Pampa	Daniel Ricardo Kroneberger	Radical Civic Union	2011	2015
La Pampa	María Cristina Regazzoli	La Pampa Justicialist Party	2009	2013
La Pampa	Roberto Ricardo Robledo	La Pampa Justicialist Party	2009	2013
La Rioja	Olga Inés Brizuela y Doria	Radical Civic Union	2011	2014 (Note: Resigned on 10 December 2013 to become a member of the provincial legislature of La Rioja. Replaced by Héctor Enrique Olivares.)
La Rioja	Griselda Noemí Herrera	Front for Victory–PJ	2011	2015
La Rioja	Julio César Martínez	Radical Civic Union	2009	2013
La Rioja	Javier Héctor Tineo	Front for Victory–PJ	2011	2015
La Rioja	Jorge Raúl Yoma	Front for Victory–PJ	2009	2013
Mendoza	Jorge Luis Albarracín	Radical Civic Union	2009	2013
Mendoza	Guillermo Ramón Carmona	Front for Victory–PJ	2011	2015
Mendoza	Omar Bruno De Marchi	Democratic Party of Mendoza	2009	2013
Mendoza	Omar Chafí Félix	Front for Victory–PJ	2009	2013
Mendoza	Anabel Fernández Sagasti	Front for Victory–PJ	2011	2015
Mendoza	Juan Dante González	Front for Victory–PJ	2011	2015
Mendoza	Mariana Juri	Radical Civic Union	2009	2013
Mendoza	Roberto Arturo Pradines	Democratic Party of Mendoza	2011	2015
Mendoza	Enrique Luis Thomas	Peronist Front	2009	2013
Mendoza	Enrique Andrés Vaquié	Radical Civic Union	2011	2015
Misiones	José Daniel Guccione	Front for Victory–PJ	2011	2015
Misiones	Stella Maris Leverberg	Front for Victory–PJ	2011	2015
Misiones	Julia Argentina Perié	Front for Victory–PJ	2011	2015
Misiones	Federico Ramón Puerta	Peronist Front	2009	2013
Misiones	Oscar Felipe Redczuk	Front for Victory–PJ	2011	2015
Misiones	Silvia Lucrecia Risko	Front for Victory–PJ	2009	2013
Misiones	Alex Roberto Ziegler	Front for Victory–PJ	2009	2013
Neuquén	José Ricardo Brillo	Neuquén People's Movement	2009	2013
Neuquén	José Alberto Ciampini	Front for Victory–PJ	2011	2015
Neuquén	Alicia Marcela Comelli	Neuquén People's Movement	2011	2015
Neuquén	Olga Elizabeth Guzmán	Neuquén People's Movement	2009	2013
Neuquén	Linda Cristina Yagüe	Radical Civic Union	2009	2013
Río Negro	Oscar Edmundo Nicolás Albrieu	Front for Victory–PJ	2009	2013
Río Negro	Herman Horacio Avoscan	Front for Victory–PJ	2011	2015
Río Negro	Hugo Castañón	Radical Civic Union	2009	2013
Río Negro	Jorge Alberto Cejas	Front for Victory–PJ	2011	2015
Río Negro	Silvina García Larraburu	Front for Victory–PJ	2011	2013 (Note: Resigned on 10 December 2013 to become a National Senator. Replaced by José Gagliardi.)
Salta	Bernardo José Biella Calvet	UDESO Salta	2011	2015
Salta	María Cristina del Valle Fiore Viñuales	Salta Renewal Party	2011	2013 (Note: Resigned on 10 December 2013 to become a National Senator. Replaced by Susana Mercedes Canela.)
Salta	Pablo Francisco Juan Kosiner	Front for Victory–PJ	2011	2015
Salta	Alfredo Horacio Olmedo	We Are All Salta	2009	2013
Salta	José Antonio Vilariño	Front for Victory–PJ	2011	2015
Salta	Walter Raúl Wayar	Peronist Federal Front	2009	2013
Salta	Fernando Yarade	Front for Victory–PJ	2009	2013
San Juan	Graciela María Caselles	Front for Victory–PJ	2011	2015
San Juan	Margarita Ferrá de Bartol	Front for Victory–PJ	2009	2013 (Note: Died 11 October 2013.)
San Juan	Eduardo Mauricio Ibarra	Union for San Juan	2009	2013
San Juan	Héctor Daniel Tomas	Front for Victory–PJ	2009	2013
San Juan	José Rubén Uñac	Front for Victory–PJ	2011	2015
San Juan	José Antonio Villa	Front for Victory–PJ	2011	2015
San Luis	Lino Walter Aguilar	Peronist Front	2011	2015
San Luis	Ivana María Bianchi	Peronist Front	2011	2015
San Luis	Sergio Horacio Pansa	Peronist Front	2009	2013
San Luis	Alberto José Pérez	Peronist Front	2009	2013
San Luis	Nora Esther Videla	Peronist Front	2009	2013
Santa Cruz	Elsa María Álvarez	Radical Civic Union	2009	2013
Santa Cruz	Blanca Blanco de Peralta	Front for Victory–PJ	2009	2013
Santa Cruz	Eduardo Raúl Costa	Radical Civic Union	2009	2013
Santa Cruz	Ana María Ianni	Front for Victory–PJ	2011	2015
Santa Cruz	Mario Alfredo Metaza	Front for Victory–PJ	2011	2015
Santa Fe	Jorge Mario Álvarez	Radical Civic Union	2009	2013
Santa Fe	Celia Isabel Arena	Front for Victory–PJ	2009	2013
Santa Fe	Omar Segundo Barchetta	Socialist Party	2011	2015
Santa Fe	Carlos Alberto Carranza	Peronist Front	2009	2013
Santa Fe	Alicia Mabel Ciciliani	Socialist Party	2009	2013
Santa Fe	Marcos Cleri	Front for Victory–PJ	2011	2015
Santa Fe	Carlos Marcelo Comi	Civic Coalition ARI	2009	2013
Santa Fe	Carlos Alberto Favario	Democratic Progressive Party	2009	2013
Santa Fe	Juan Carlos Forconi	Front for Victory–PJ	2009	2013
Santa Fe	Daniel Germano	Peronist Front	2009	2013
Santa Fe	Claudia Alejandra Giaccone	Front for Victory–PJ	2011	2015
Santa Fe	Oscar Ariel Martínez	Front for Victory–PJ	2011	2015
Santa Fe	Fabián Francisco Peralta	GEN	2011	2015
Santa Fe	Omar Ángel Perotti	Front for Victory–PJ	2011	2015
Santa Fe	Élida Elena Rasino	Socialist Party	2011	2015
Santa Fe	Antonio Sabino Riestra	Popular Unity	2011	2015
Santa Fe	Augstín Oscar Rossi	Front for Victory–PJ	2009	2013
Santa Fe	Silvia Rosa Simoncini	Front for Victory–PJ	2011	2015
Santa Fe	Juan Carlos Zabalza	Socialist Party	2011	2015
Santiago del Estero	Norma Amanda Abdala de Matarazzo	Civic Front for Santiago	2009	2013
Santiago del Estero	Daniel Agustín Brue	Civic Front for Santiago	2009	2013
Santiago del Estero	José Alberto Herrera	Civic Front for Santiago	2011	2015
Santiago del Estero	Graciela Navarro	Civic Front for Santiago	2011	2015
Santiago del Estero	Cristian Rodolfo Oliva	Civic Front for Santiago	2009	2013
Santiago del Estero	Mirta Ameliana Pastoriza	Civic Front for Santiago	2011	2015
Santiago del Estero	Aída Delia Ruiz	Civic Front for Santiago	2011	2015
Tierra del Fuego	Rosana Andrea Bertone	Front for Victory–PJ	2009	2013
Tierra del Fuego	Julio César Catalán Magni	Front for Victory–PJ	2011	2013 (Note: Resigned on 10 December 2013 to become a National Senator. Replaced by Verónica González.)
Tierra del Fuego	Liliana Fadul	Fueguian Federal Party	2009	2013
Tierra del Fuego	Jorge Alberto Garramuño	Fueguian People's Movement	2011	2013 (Note: Resigned on 10 December 2013 to become a National Senator. Replaced by Graciela Eunice Boyadjian.)
Tierra del Fuego	Rubén Darío Sciotto	Front for Victory–PJ	2011	2015
Tucumán	Isaac Benjamín Bromberg	Front for Victory–PJ	2011	2015
Tucumán	María del Carmen Carrillo	Front for Victory–PJ	2013 (Note: Since 10 December 2013. Replaced Beatriz Graciela Mirkin.)	2015
Tucumán	Juan Francisco Casañas	Radical Civic Union	2009	2013
Tucumán	Stella Maris Córdoba	Front for Victory–PJ	2009	2013
Tucumán	Alfredo Carlos Dato	Front for Victory–PJ	2011	2015
Tucumán	Miriam Graciela Gallardo	Front for Victory–PJ	2009	2013
Tucumán	Luis Fernando Sacca	Radical Civic Union	2011	2015
Tucumán	Juan Arturo Salim	Front for Victory–PJ	2009	2013
Tucumán	Walter Marcelo Santillán	Front for Victory–PJ	2011	2015
