= Civic Coalition (Argentina) =

Defunct political coalition in Argentina

Civic Coalition Coalición Cívica
- Leader: Elisa Carrió
- Founded: 11 April 2007
- Dissolved: 14 December 2011
- Headquarters: Buenos Aires
- Ideology: Third Way; Factions: Liberalism; Social democracy
- Political position: Centre
- Colors: Light blue and Green
- Seats in the Chamber of Deputies: 5 / 257
- Seats in the Senate: 1 / 72

Website
- http://www.coalicioncivica.org.ar/

The Civic Coalition (in Spanish, Coalición Cívica) was a political coalition in Argentina. It was founded by Elisa Carrió, as an association supported by the ARI party, as well as a number of other political groups and individual political leaders, notably UPT - Union for All of Patricia Bullrich and GEN - Generation for a National Encounter of Margarita Stolbizer.

Carrió ran for presidency on the 2007 election representing the Civic Coalition, along with the Socialist Party Senator for Santa Fe Province, Rubén Giustiniani. The coalition lost the election, although it did well in the largest cities of Argentina, getting support especially from the urban middle and upper classes.

Carrió aroused a wave of murmurs by differentiating what he promised to be his foreign policy from the one he observes today. She promised to "reestablish brotherhood with Uruguay" as his first gesture of winning the presidency. She also said that he will promote a "new deal with the Armed Forces."

== History ==
Leading figures of the Coalition, as well as Carrió, Bullrich and Stolbizer, include Alfonso Prat Gay, former head of the Central Bank, and Senators María Eugenia Estenssoro and Samuel Cabanchik. The embrace by Carrió of these centrist figures proved controversial among more left-wing members of ARI and some national legislators declined to join the new expanded Civic Coalition grouping in Congress following the 2007 elections and instead formed a separate block called the Autonomous ARI. In May 2008, the block, led by Eduardo Macaluse, announced that they were forming a new party, Solidarity and Equality (Solidaridad e Igualdad - SI). Others who left ARI were Carlos Raimundi, Leonardo Gorbacz, Delia Bisutti, Nelida Belous, Verónica Venas, Emilio García Méndez, Lidia Naim and María América González. Senator María Rosa Díaz also appeared at the launch of SI. Several of the legislators who created the new party had won their seats in the 2007 election as part of the Civic Coalition, which they later opposed.

The ARI deputies from Tierra del Fuego sit with the SI members in a separate block in the Chamber of Deputies. Subsequently Senators María Rosa Díaz and José Carlos Martínez left ARI altogether in March 2009.

Since 2009, the coalition refounded itself as a party, called Civic Coalition ARI (CC-ARI), and works with the Radical Civic Union, Federal Consensus (ConFe), the vehicle of Vice-President Julio Cobos) and the Socialist Party, in the alliance Civic and Social Agreement (ACyS), although the actual situation of it varies in each district.

The Civic Coalition left the Civic and Social Agreement on 12 August 2010.

== Coalition members ==
Party	Leader	Ideology	Position
Civic Coalition ARI	Elisa Carrió	Social liberalism	Centre
Socialist Party	Rubén Giustiniani	Social democracy, Democratic socialism	Centre-left
Open Policy for Social Integrity	José Octavio Bordón	Peronism, Social democracy	Centre
Radical Civic Union (Faction)	Ernesto Sanz	Social democracy, Social liberalism	Centre
Freedom Union	Patricia Bullrich	Conservative liberalism	Right Wing

== Former members ==
Party	Leader	Ideology	Position
Generation for a National Encounter	Margarita Stolbizer	Social democracy	Centre-left
