= José Carlos Martínez (politician) =

Argentine politician (1962–2011)

José Martínez
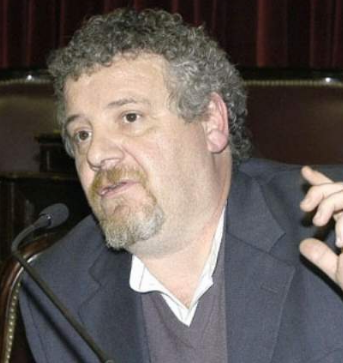

National Senator
- In office 10 December 2007 – 7 July 2011
- Constituency: Tierra del Fuego

Personal details
- Born: 29 November 1962 Córdoba
- Died: 7 July 2011 (aged 48) Tolhuin, Tierra del Fuego, Argentina
- Party: ARI (until 2009); New Encounter (from 2009)
- Spouse: Verónica Alejandra Lilia Scardino
- Profession: Medical technician

José Carlos Martínez (29 November 1962 – 7 July 2011) was an Argentine politician, formerly of ARI. He sat in the Argentine Senate representing Tierra del Fuego Province.

Martínez graduated from the National Technological University and gained a masters at the University of Alcalá, Spain in 1988 and again in 2002. From 1981 until 1985 he worked in the San Roque Hospital in Córdoba. He moved to Río Grande, Tierra del Fuego in 1985, working from the following year in the Río Grande regional hospital. He was elected to be Director of the Provincial Institute of Social Prevision from 1995 until 2001. He then served as Director of the social security organisation IPAUSS. He was active in the trade unions Argentine Workers' Center (CTA) and the Association of State Workers.

In 2003, Martínez was elected to the provincial legislature, serving until 2007. He was elected to the Senate in 2007.

As part of building a broader coalition ahead of the 2007 elections, ARI's leader Elisa Carrió, reached out to centrist figures such as Patricia Bullrich and María Eugenia Estenssoro. This proved controversial in ARI ranks and several national legislators formed a separate block called the Autonomous ARI in Congress. In May 2008, the block, led by Eduardo Macaluse, announced that they were forming a new party, Solidarity and Equality (Solidaridad e Igualdad Sí). Martínez's provincial party is particularly estranged from the national leadership and he did not join the Civic Coalition block, sitting in an ARI block with his fellow Senator for Tierra del Fuergo, María Rosa Díaz.

In early 2009, Argentine politics was seeing rising tensions, with defections from the ruling Front for Victory block and fierce debate over the President's proposal to move legislative elections forward by several months. Carrió is one of those leading the opposition to the move and there was speculation Congress would vote against the proposals. However, in a surprise move, Martínez and his colleague María Rosa Díaz announced in March 2009 that they would be supporting the Government and completely leaving ARI. They would nevertheless continue to support Fabiana Ríos, the ARI governor of Tierra del Fuego. They were quoted as saying that ARI no longer represents their views and ideas and that"We regard that opposition, for opposition’s sake, is contrary to the popular mandate we received".

He was killed in a road traffic accident on 7 July 2011.
