= María Rosa Díaz =

Argentine politician

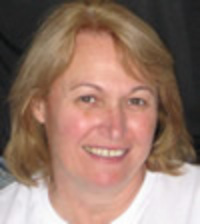

National Senator
- In office 10 December 2007 – 10 December 2013
- Constituency: Tierra del Fuego Province

Personal details
- Born: 28 February 1953 (age 73) Firmat, Santa Fe
- Party: Support for an Egalitarian Republic (until 2009); New Encounter (since 2011)
- Spouse: Alejandro Mario Vazquez
- Profession: Teacher

María Rosa Díaz de Vazquez (born 28 February 1953, Firmat) is an Argentine politician, formerly of the Support for an Egalitarian Republic (ARI) party. She sat in the Argentine Senate representing Tierra del Fuego Province from 2007 to 2013.

A teacher, Díaz moved to Tierra del Fuego in 1987. She began teaching in Ushuaia in 1990, working until her retirement in 2007. From December 2001 until December 2004, she served as part of the directorate of the provincial institute of social security (IPAUSS). She stood to be national deputy in 2005 and was elected as Senator in 2007, assuming office in December of that year.

As part of building a broader coalition ahead of the 2007 elections, ARI's leader Elisa Carrió, reached out to centrist figures such as Patricia Bullrich and María Eugenia Estenssoro. This proved controversial in ARI ranks and several national legislators formed a separate block called the Autonomous ARI in Congress. In May 2008, the block, led by Eduardo Macaluse, announced that they were forming a new party, Solidarity and Equality (Solidaridad e Igualdad Sí). Díaz also appeared at the launch of Sí, although she did not officially join. She did not join the Civic Coalition block either, however, sitting in an ARI block.

In early 2009, Argentine politics has seen rising tensions, with defections from the ruling Front for Victory block and fierce debate over the President's proposal to move legislative elections forward by several months. Carrió was one of those leading the opposition to the move and there was speculation Congress would vote against the proposals. However, in a surprise move, María Rosa Díaz and her colleague José Martínez announced in March 2009 that they would be supporting the Government and completely leaving ARI. They would nevertheless continued to support Fabiana Ríos, the ARI governor of Tierra del Fuego. They were quoted as saying that ARI no longer represents their views and ideas and that"We regard that opposition, for opposition’s sake, is contrary to the popular mandate we received".
