= Social and Civic Agreement =

Former political coalition in Argentina

Social and Civic Agreement Acuerdo Cívico y Social
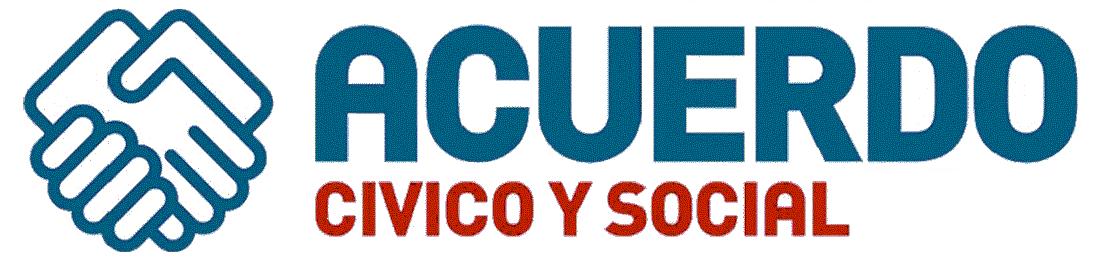
- Leader: Elisa Carrió; Ernesto Sanz; Rubén Giustiniani
- Founded: 2009
- Dissolved: 2011
- Headquarters: Buenos Aires
- Ideology: Social democracy Democratic socialism Social liberalism
- Political position: Centre-left
- Colors: Red and White
- Seats in the Chamber of Deputies: 46 / 257
- Seats in the Senate: 14 / 72

The Social and Civic Agreement (Spanish: Acuerdo Cívico y Social, ACyS) was a center-left congressional alliance in Argentina, integrated by the Radical Civic Union (UCR) the Socialist Party (PS) and the Civic Coalition ARI (CC-ARI), which acted as an umbrella national electoral alliance at the last 2009 Argentine legislative elections. The Civic Coalition, which was a founder member of the Social and Civic Agreement, left the alliance on 12 August 2010.

== Background ==
During the 2008 conflicts between the Argentine Government and the agricultural sector, most factions of the parties that would later ally themselves into the ACyS took a strong stance against the National Government's agricultural policy. Previously, at the 2007 presidential elections, the Civic Coalition and the Socialist Party ran on a joint presidential ticket, and - since 2005 - both parties plus the Radical Civic Union make up the Progressive, Civic and Social Front alliance in Santa Fe Province that won the provincial Governorship on 2 September 2007 for socialist Hermes Binner.

== 2009 legislative elections ==
The ACyS was composed of the following parties in each Province:

District	Parties under ACyS umbrella	Foremost candidates	Notes	Results of the 28 June 2009 elections
Buenos Aires Autonomous City	Civic Coalition; Radical Civic Union	Alfonso Prat Gay; Ricardo Gil Lavedra; Elisa Carrió	The Socialist Party went on its own in the district.	19,05%; 344.388 votes; 3rd place
Buenos Aires Province	Civic Coalition; Federal Consensus (ConFe); Socialist Party; Radical Civic Union	Margarita Stolbizer; Ricardo Alfonsín; Mario Barbieri		21,48%; 1.555.825 votes; 3rd place
Catamarca	Civic Coalition; Socialist Party; Radical Civic Union	Genaro Collantes; Oscar Castillo	As the Civic and Social Front of Catamarca governs the Province since 2003.	38,86%; 57.499 votes; Winner
Córdoba	Civic Coalition; New Party; Socialist Party	Luis Juez; Norma Morandini; Gumersindo Alonso	Under the name Civic Front. The Radical Civic Union of Córdoba went on its own.	27,97%; 462.561 votes; Winner
Corrientes	Civic Coalition; Socialist Party; Radical Civic Union	Nito Artaza	Under the name Encounter for Corrientes.	32,75%; 141.021 votes; 2nd place
Chaco	Civic Coalition; Socialist Party; Radical Civic Union	Pablo Orsolini; Alicia Terada	Under the name Front for Everyone	44,42%; 227.006 votes; 2nd place
Entre Ríos	Civic Coalition; Radical Civic Union	Atilio Benedetti; Hilda Ré	Socialist Party went on its own.	35,02%; 228.263 votes; Winner
Formosa	Civic Coalition; Socialist Party; Radical Civic Union	Ricardo Buryaile; María Inés Delfino		35,75%; 79.366 votes; 2nd place
Jujuy	Jujuy Popular Movement; Socialist Party; Radical Civic Union	Mario Fiad	Cambio Jujeño party, identified with Support for an Egalitarian; Republic (ARI), went on its own.	30,97%; 84.284 votes; 2nd place
La Pampa	Socialist Party; Radical Civic Union	Juan Carlos Marino; Ulises Forte	As Civic and Social Front of La Pampa.	35,47%; 62.782 votes; 2nd place
Mendoza	Civic Coalition; Federal Consensus (ConFe); Socialist Party; Radical Civic Union	Ernesto Sanz; Laura Montero	As Federal Civic Front.	48,40%; 414.822 votes; Winner
Neuquén	Civic Coalition; Socialist Party	Edgardo Kristensen; Beatriz Kreitman	As Social and Civic Agreement (ARI-PS). Radical Civic Union of Neuquén went on its own.	5,05%; 13.805 votes; 6th place
Salta	Civic Coalition; Socialist Party; Propuesta Salteña; Radical Civic Union	Ricardo Gómez Diez		4,86%; 23.362 votes; 7th place
San Juan	Civic Coalition; Socialist Party; Radical Civic Union	Rodolfo Colombo		15,07%; 47.836 votes; 3rd place
San Luis	Civic Coalition; Socialist Party; Radical Civic Union	Daniel Rodríguez Saá		11,94%; 22.948 votes; 4th place
Santa Cruz	Civic Coalition; Socialist Party; Radical Civic Union	Eduardo Costa	As Change for Growth.	42,54%; 53.133 votes; Winner
Santa Fe	Civic Coalition; Socialist Party; Radical Civic Union; Communist Party; Democratic Progressive Party; Solidarity and Equality	Rubén Giustiniani; Alicia Ciciliani; Silvia Augsburger	As the Progressive, Civic and Social Front it governs the Province since 2007.	40,60%; 662.210 votes; 2nd place
Santiago del Estero	Civic Coalition; Socialist Party; Radical Civic Union	José Luis Zavalía		11,07%; 33.781 votes; 3rd place
Tierra del Fuego	Civic Coalition; Socialist Party	Leonardo Gorbacz	As Progressive Project. The Radical Civic Union of Tierra del Fuego went on its own.	9,36%; 5.687 votes; 5th place
Tucumán	Civic Coalition; Socialist Party; Radical Civic Union	José Cano; Juan Casañas		15,62%; 108.469 votes; 2nd place

== See also ==
- Politics of Argentina
