= Alicia Terada =

Argentine politician, born 1956

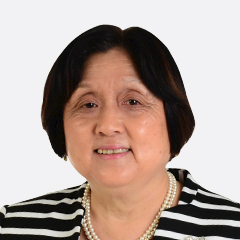

National Deputy
- In office 22 October 2014 – 10 December 2021
- Constituency: Chaco
- In office 10 December 2009 – 10 December 2013
- Constituency: Chaco

Personal details
- Born: 26 December 1956 (age 69) Resistencia, Argentina
- Party: Civic Coalition ARI
- Other political affiliations: Broad Front UNEN (2011–2013); Juntos por el Cambio (2015–present)
- Education: National University of the Northeast

Alicia Terada (born 26 December 1956) is an Argentine politician who served as a National Deputy elected in Chaco Province. A member of the Civic Coalition ARI, Terada was first elected in 2009, serving a four-year term until 2013. Despite running for re-election in 2013, she only took office in 2014 in replacement of Miguel Ángel Tejedor. She sat in the Juntos por el Cambio parliamentary inter-bloc from 2019 to 2021.

== Early life and education ==
Terada was born on 26 December 1956 in Resistencia, Chaco Province. She is the granddaughter of Japanese immigrants. She studied law at the National University of the Northeast (UNNE), graduating in 1978.

She is married to Koshi Shimoyama and has three children. She is Buddhist.

== Political career ==
From 1978 to 1979, she was electoral secretary of the Federal Tribunal of Resistencia. She also worked as an advisor to the National Social Security Administration (ANSES) in Chaco until 1994, then going on to work at the legal division of the Federal Public Income Administration (AFIP) in Resistencia until 2005.

Terada co-founded the Support for an Egalitarian Republic (ARI) Foundation alongside Elisa Carrió, with whom Terada went to university; the foundation would later become the Civic Coalition ARI.

She ran for the governorship of Chaco in 2007, and was the third-most voted candidate with 3.88%, trailing far behind the Justicialist Party and Radical Civic Union candidates.

=== National deputy ===
Terada ran for a seat in the Argentine Chamber of Deputies in the 2009 legislative election; she was the second candidate in the Social and Civic Agreement list in Chaco Province, behind Pablo Eduardo Orsolini. The list received 44.48% of the votes, and Terada made it past the D'Hondt cut to be elected. She was sworn in on 10 December 2009. She ran for re-election in the 2013 legislative election as part of Unión por Chaco, but this time, the list did not receive enough votes for Terada to be elected. She took office again in 2014, in replacement of Miguel Ángel Tejedor, who resigned to be appointed intendente of Charata. She was re-elected in 2017, as part of the Cambiemos coalition.

In 2010, as a national deputy, Terada voted against the Equal Marriage Law, which legalized same-sex marriage in Argentina. Instead, she introduced an alternative proposal to eradicate the category of "marriage" from the Civil Code, instead introducing the term "family union" for all couples regardless of sex. She was also an opponent of the legalization of abortion in Argentina, voting against the two Voluntary Interruption of Pregnancy bills that were debated by the Argentine Congress in 2018 and 2020. During the 2020 debate, Terada stated the bill did not take into account "men's rights".

In 2017, she was conferred the honor of the Order of the Rising Sun (5th Class, Gold and Silver Rays) by the Japanese foreign ministry.
