= Zuvic =

Zuvic is a surname. Notable people with the surname include:

- Daniella Monet Zuvic (born 1989), American actress
- Mariana Zuvic (born 1974), Argentine politician
