= Juan Manuel López (politician) =

Argentine lawyer

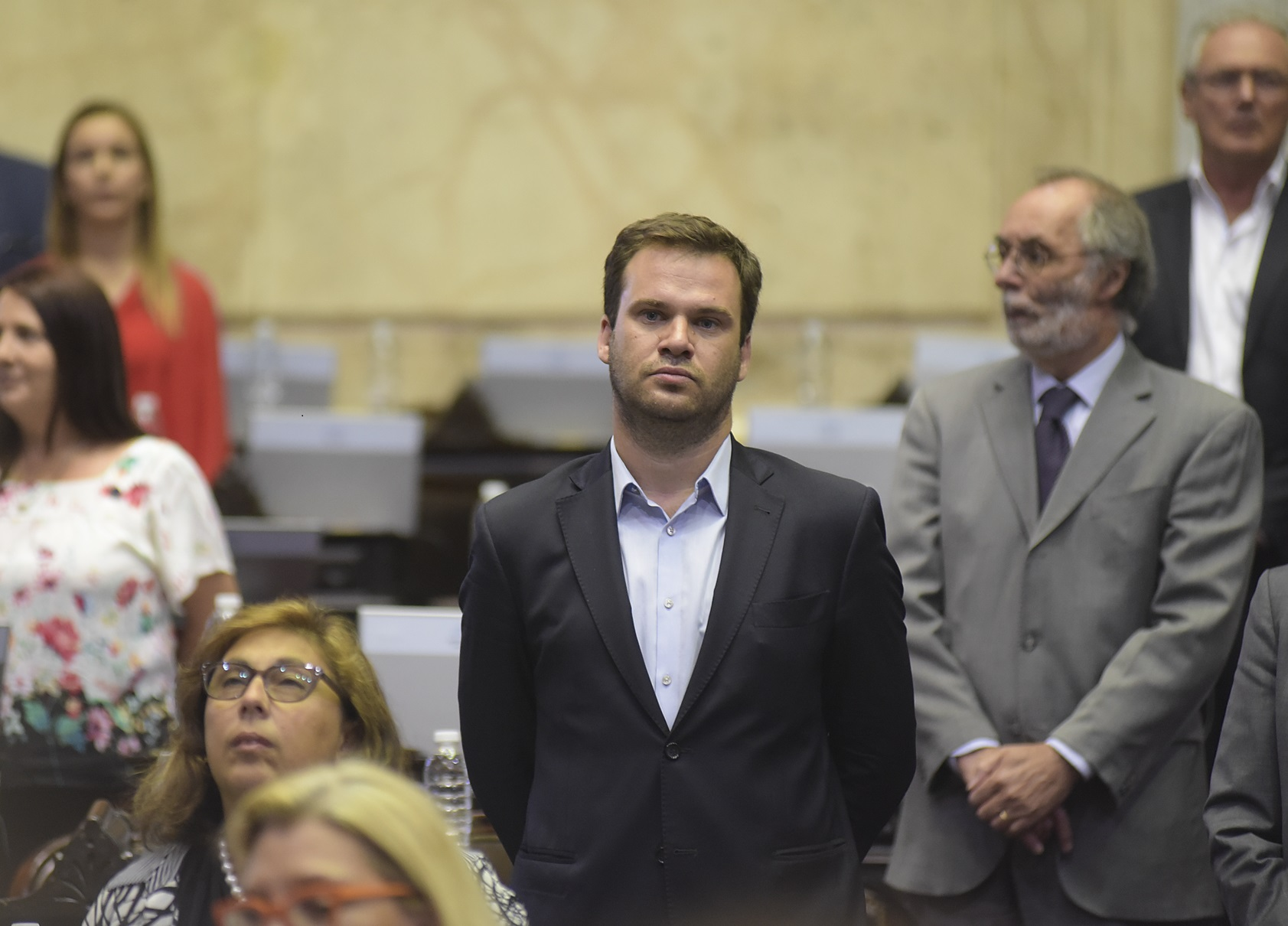

National Deputy
- In office 10 December 2017 – 9 December 2025
- Constituency: City of Buenos Aires (2017–2021); Buenos Aires (since 2021)

Personal details
- Born: 16 September 1983 (age 43) Saladillo, Buenos Aires Province, Argentina
- Party: Civic Coalition ARI
- Education: University of Buenos Aires
- Profession: Lawyer

Juan Manuel López (born 16 September 1983) is an Argentine lawyer, who served as National Deputy from 2017 to 2025. López was first elected in 2017 in the Federal Capital, and re-elected in 2021 in Buenos Aires Province. He presided the Civic Coalition ARI parliamentary bloc.

== Early life and career ==
López was born on 16 September 1983 in Saladillo, a small town in central Buenos Aires Province. He finished high school at the Escuela Agrotécnica Selesiana Carlos M. Cásares in 2001, and then studied law at the University of Buenos Aires, graduating in 2008.

He served as a congressional advisor to Elisa Carrió, the founder and leader of the Civic Coalition ARI.

== Political career ==
López ran for a seat in the Argentine Chamber of Deputies in the 2017 legislative election; he was the fourth candidate in the Vamos Juntos list in the City of Buenos Aires. The list was the most voted, with 50.93% of the votes, and López was elected. Upon the resignation of Elisa Carrió from the Chamber of Deputies in 2019, López became president of the Civic Coalition bloc.

As a national deputy, López formed part of the parliamentary commissions on Budget and Treasuty, Political Trials (of which he was appointed vice-president), Constitutional Affairs, Energy and Fuels, and Justice.

Ahead of the 2021 primary election, López was confirmed as one of the candidates in the "Es Juntos" list in Buenos Aires Province, and was re-elected to a second term in the general election.
