= Maximiliano Ferraro =

Argentine politician and political scientist

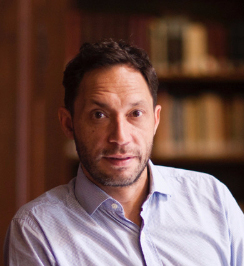

National Deputy
- Incumbent
- Assumed office 10 December 2019
- Constituency: City of Buenos Aires

President of the Civic Coalition ARI
- Incumbent
- Assumed office 15 December 2018
- Preceded by: Maricel Etchecoin

Legislator of the City of Buenos Aires
- In office 10 December 2011 – 10 December 2019

Personal details
- Born: 4 November 1975 (age 50) Buenos Aires, Argentina
- Party: Civic Coalition ARI
- Other political affiliations: Juntos por el Cambio (2015–2023)

Maximiliano "Maxi" Ferraro (born 4 November 1975) is an Argentine politician who has served as National Deputy for Buenos Aires City since 2019 and is the current chairman of the Civic Coalition ARI.

== Political career ==
From 2005 to 2007, he was chief advisor to national deputy Elisa Carrió. Between 2007 and 2011, he was also the Undersecretary of Coordination of the Buenos Aires City Legislature.

In 2011, Ferraro was elected to the Legislature in his own right, and he was reelected in 2015 under the ECO alliance.

On 15 December 2018, Ferraro was elected president of the Civic Coalition ARI succeeding Mariana Zuvic, and during the Argentine legislative elections of 2019 he was elected national deputy for the City of Buenos Aires under the Cambiemos ticket.

In January 2025, after President Javier Milei made a mention of the case of William and Zachary Zulock at the 2025 World Economic Forum in Davos, Ferraro strongly condemned Milei's rhetoric and his usage of "stigmatizing and abhorrent" cases to attack the LGBTQ+ community. Milei had implied by mentioning the Zulocks, two gay men from the U.S. who sexually abused their adoptive children, that homosexuality and the gender ideology were linked to pedophilia.

== Personal life ==
An openly gay man, Ferraro is known for his work regarding social legislation and LGBTQ rights.

== Electoral history ==
Electoral history of Maximiliano Ferraro
Election	Office	List	#	District	Votes			Result	Ref.
Election	Office	List	#	District	Total	%	P.	Result	Ref.
2007	City Legislator	Civic Coalition	4	City of Buenos Aires	148,899	8.59%	5th (Note: Presented on an electoral list. The data shown represents the share of the vote the entire party/alliance received in that constituency.)	Not elected	
2011	City Legislator	Civic Coalition	1	City of Buenos Aires	69,623	3.95%	5th	Elected	
2015	City Legislator	ECO	2	City of Buenos Aires	431,324	23.51%	2nd	Elected	
2019	National Deputy	Juntos por el Cambio	1	City of Buenos Aires	1,060,404	53.02%	1st	Elected	
2023	National Deputy	Juntos por el Cambio	3	City of Buenos Aires	782,984	42.61%	1st	Elected	

Party political offices
Preceded by Maricel Etchecoin	President of the Civic Coalition ARI; 2018–present	Incumbent
