= Eduardo Macaluse =

Argentine politician

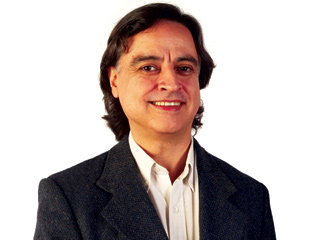
Eduardo Macaluse

Eduardo Gabriel Macaluse (born 17 March 1959) is an Argentine politician and teacher. He is a member of the Argentine Chamber of Deputies and leads the Solidarity and Equality party (SI), a grouping of dissidents from the Support for an Egalitarian Republic party (ARI), which is (since 2009) part of the political party 'Proyecto Sur'.

A teacher of Spanish and literature, in 1986 Macaluse founded the education trade union SUTEBA and served as its Secretary General until 1999. He was active in various education campaigns and international education organisations and in 1998 participated in the formation of the Argentine Workers' Center, a new national trade union center set up as an alternative to the Peronist-dominated General Confederation of Labour.

Macaluse was a member of the Frente Grande from its foundation in 1993, as a left-wing alliance opposed to the neo-liberal policies of President Carlos Menem. In 1999 he was elected as a National Deputy for Buenos Aires Province from the Frente's broader front, Frepaso, as part of the Alliance for Work, Justice and Education which took the Presidency with Fernando de la Rúa.

In April 2001, Macaluse was one of a group of Frepaso deputies who pulled out of the Alliance block in Congress, criticising the government of President De la Rúa and particularly the appointment of Domingo Cavallo as Economy Minister. In June 2001, Macaluse and three of his colleagues joined the new ARI congressional block (then 'Argentines for a Republic of Equals') led by Elisa Carrió, which was attracting centre-left dissidents from the ruling coalition and other parties. In 2002, ARI became a formal party, as 'Support for an Egalitarian Republic]'. He became the leader of the ARI block in the lower house of Congress.

While ARI has grown in support in recent years, it has itself faced splits and resignations. Ahead of the 2007 President elections, Carrió formed the Civic Coalition, to bring together other centre-left and centrist opponents to the Presidency of Néstor Kirchner as well as religious and social groups. The Coalition was Carrió's vehicle to stand for the presidency, in which she came second behind eventual winner Cristina Fernández de Kirchner. However, some on the left of ARI, including Macaluse, were angered by Carrió reaching out to centre-right figures such as Patricia Bullrich and María Eugenia Estenssoro. Directly after the 2007 elections, he led a group of other national legislators in forming a separate block called the Autonomous ARI in Congress. In May 2008, the block announced that they were forming a new party, Solidarity and Equality (Solidaridad e Igualdad - SI). Others who left ARI were Carlos Raimundi, Leonardo Gorbacz, Delia Bisutti, Nelida Belous, Verónica Venas, Emilio García Méndez, Lidia Naim and María América González. Several of the legislators that created the new party had won their seats in the 2007 election as part of the Civic Coalition, which they later opposed.
