= Bisutti =

Bisutti is a surname. Notable people with the surname include:

- Alessio Bisutti (born 1977), Italian entrepreneur and professional boxer
- Danielle Bisutti (born 1976), American actress and singer
- Delia Bisutti (born 1947), Argentinian politician
- Kylie Bisutti (born 1990), American author and model
- María Aurelia Bisutti (1930–2010), Argentine actress
