= Mario Fiad =

Argentine politician

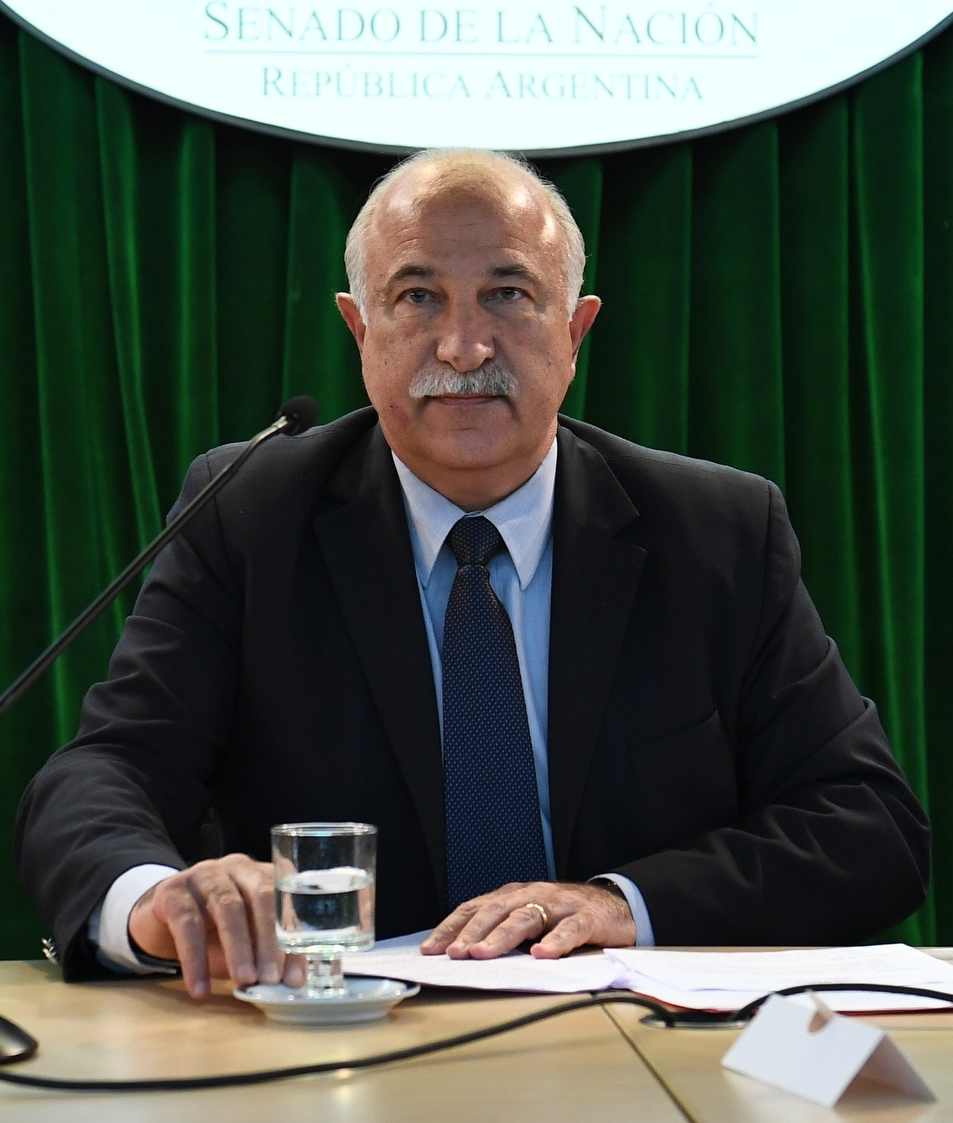

National Senator
- Incumbent
- Assumed office 10 December 2017
- Constituency: Jujuy

Minister of Health of Jujuy Province
- In office 10 December 2015 – 12 July 2017
- Governor: Gerardo Morales
- Preceded by: Saúl Flores
- Succeeded by: Gustavo Bouhid

National Deputy
- In office 10 December 2009 – 10 December 2015
- Constituency: Jujuy

Personal details
- Born: 12 January 1957 (age 69) San Salvador de Jujuy, Argentina
- Party: Radical Civic Union
- Other political affiliations: Social and Civic Agreement (2009–2013); Juntos por el Cambio (2015–present)
- Education: National University of Córdoba

Mario Raymundo Fiad (born 12 January 1957) is an Argentine surgeon and politician, currently serving as a National Senator for Jujuy Province since 2017. He previously served as a National Deputy from 2009 to 2015, and as health minister of Jujuy from 2015 to 2017, in the government of Gerardo Morales. Fiad belongs to the Radical Civic Union (UCR), and presides the Jujuy Province UCR committee since 2015.

== Early life and career ==
Fiad was born on 12 January 1957 in San Salvador de Jujuy, capital of Jujuy Province. He finished high school at Colegio Nacional Teodoro Sánchez de Bustamante. He enrolled at the National University of Córdoba in 1975, finishing his medical surgeon degree in 1981. He then specialized in dermatology at the Hospital Argerich, in Buenos Aires, and the Hospital Clínic, in Barcelona, Spain.

Fiad returned to Jujuy in 1983 to set up his medical practice. He worked as a dermatologist at the Hospital Pablo Soria and later served as the provincial department chief of STIs and leprosy, and as dermatology service chief at the Hospital San Roque. In 1988, he co-founded the Instituto Dermatológico Belgrano. Fiad served as president of the Sociedad Jujeña de Dermatología, overseeing the coordinating unit of national health programmes in Jujuy Province. His work would lead him to be elected president of the Colegio Médico de Jujuy in 2001. In 2006, he finished a new specialty in economy and health administration from Universidad ISalud.

== Political career ==
An affiliate of the Radical Civic Union (UCR), Fiad first ran for office in the 2009 legislative election as the first candidate in the Social and Civic Agreement list to the National Chamber of Deputies in Jujuy. Despite being a newcomer with little public recognition, Fiad's received 30.94% of the votes and was the second-most voted list in the province, enough for Fiad to be elected. He took office on 10 December 2009.

In 2011, Fiad was the UCR candidate for governor of Jujuy as part of the Union for Social Development (UDESO) alliance. He stood against Justicialist Party candidate and former governor Eduardo Fellner. Fiad received 25.89% of the vote and came in a distant second against Fellner's 57.53%.

Fiad was re-elected as deputy in 2013 as the first candidate in the Frente Jujeño list, which was the most-voted in the province with 39.81% of the vote. Just two years later, however, he resigned from his seat in order to take charge of Jujuy's Ministry of Health in the new government of Gerardo Morales, who had been elected governor in the October 2015 provincial elections.

In 2017, Fiad was elected to the National Senate on the Cambiemos list, alongside Silvia Giacoppo, which was once again the most-voted list in Jujuy with 52.60% of the vote. He took office on 10 December 2017, with mandate until 2023.

=== Views and positions ===
Although a member of the traditionally social liberal UCR, Fiad is considered a social conservative. In 2010, as deputy, Fiad voted against the legalisation of same-sex marriage in Argentina, despite most of the UCR (including the party's leader in Jujuy, Gerardo Morales) supporting the measure. Fiad was also a vocal opponent of the legalisation of abortion, voting against the two Voluntary Interruption of Pregnancy bills debated by the Argentine Congress in 2018 and 2020.

By contrast, in 2012, Fiad supported a number of bills seeking the decriminalisation of drug possession for personal use, arguing that drug addictions ought to be considered diseases, not crimes. In 2015, he proposed the establishment of a direct emergency line to denounce the illegal sale of drugs.
