= Ricardo Gil Lavedra =

Argentine politician and lawyer

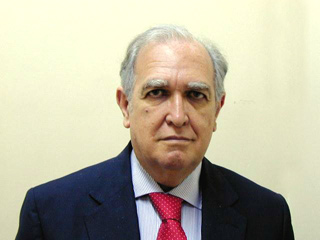

National Deputy
- In office 10 December 2009 – 10 December 2013
- Constituency: City of Buenos Aires

Minister of Justice and Human Rights
- In office 10 December 1999 – 11 October 2000
- President: Fernando de la Rúa
- Preceded by: Raúl Granillo Ocampo
- Succeeded by: Jorge de la Rúa

Personal details
- Born: 24 July 1949 (age 76) Buenos Aires, Argentina
- Party: Radical Civic Union
- Profession: Lawyer, magistrate

Ricardo Gil Lavedra (born 24 July 1949) is an Argentine lawyer, magistrate, and politician. A member of the Radical Civic Union, Gil Lavedra served as Minister of Justice during the early presidency of Fernando de la Rúa, from 1999 to 2000. From 2009 to 2013, he was a member of the Argentine Chamber of Deputies elected in Buenos Aires.

== Early life and education ==
Ricardo Rodolfo Gil Lavedra was born in Buenos Aires in 1949. He enrolled at the University of Buenos Aires Law School, and earned a juris doctor in 1972. He was named Secretary to the Supreme Court of the Province of Buenos Aires in 1973, and judge in the provincial Court of First Instance in 1974. He was hired as Vice President of Legal Affairs for the Pérez Companc Group in 1979.

== Career ==
Gil Lavedra was appointed to the National Criminal Court of Appeals in 1984, and in this capacity, he served in the panel of judges overseeing the historic 1985 Trial of the Juntas, presiding over the trial in its early phase. His cross-examination of both witnesses and defendants reportedly focused on exploring the extent of criminal organizations that existed among the Dirty War perpetrators.

He was appointed Assistant Minister of Interior by President Raúl Alfonsín in 1988, and from 1987 to 1995, served as Vice President of the United Nations Committee Against Torture.

Following a term as Vice President of the Crime Prevention Institute of the province of Buenos Aires, he was appointed Minister of Justice and Human Rights by President Fernando de la Rúa upon the latter's inaugural in December 1999. Subsequent revelations that the administration had bribed a number of UCR senators for their support of a stalled labor law flexibilization bill in April 2000 led to Gil Lavedra's resignation (as well as that of Vice President Carlos Álvarez and three other cabinet members) in October. President de la Rúa himself resigned a year later.

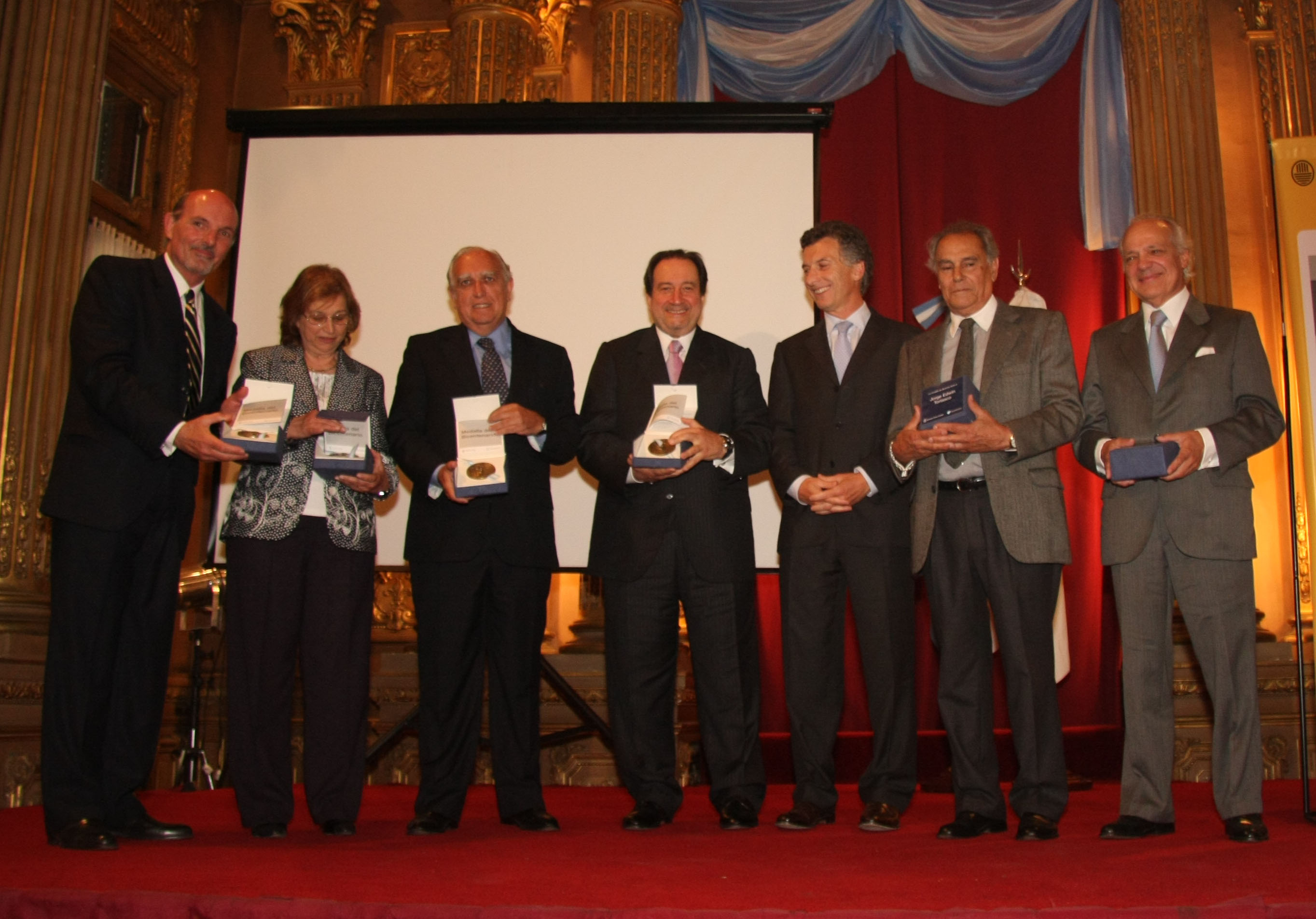
Ricardo Gil Lavedra (third from left) joins fellow presiding judges of the 1985 Trial of the Juntas in receiving the Bicentennial Medal from Mayor Mauricio Macri (third from right) on 26 October 2010.

Gil Lavedra served as an Associate Judge in the Inter-American Court of Human Rights between 2001 and 2003, and in the Argentine Supreme Court, between 2002 and 2005. He wrote numerous articles on constitutional law and legal theory beginning in 1977, including An Overview of Constitutional Amendments in Latin America in 2002. He also served as legal advisor for the United Nations Development Programme, and is a member of the Permanent Assembly for Human Rights and other Argentine jurisprudence associations.

He ran unsuccessfully for a seat in the Argentine Senate on the center-left UCR ticket in 2003, and in 2009, was elected to the Argentine Chamber of Deputies as a UCR member of the Social and Civic Agreement. He endorsed fellow UCR Congressman Ricardo Alfonsín upon the latter's August 2010 announcement of a presidential bid in 2011.

== Personal life ==
His son, filmmaker Nicolás Gil Lavedra, announced the production in 2011 of Estela, a biographical film on the life of Grandmothers of the Plaza de Mayo leader Estela Barnes de Carlotto (whose testimony the elder Gil Lavedra took as part of the Trial of the Juntas in 1985).
