= Mariana Zuvic =

Argentine politician (born 1974)

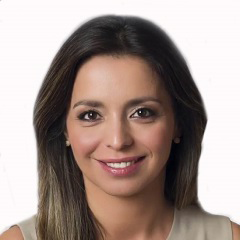

National Deputy
- In office 10 December 2019 – 10 December 2023
- Constituency: City of Buenos Aires

Personal details
- Born: Mariana de Jesús Zuvic; 18 October 1974 (age 51) Río Gallegos, Santa Cruz, Argentina
- Party: Civic Coalition ARI
- Spouse: Eduardo Raúl Costa (m. 2007; div. 2019)
- Children: 2, Carlos and Felicitas
- Education: Pompeu Fabra University

Mariana de Jesús Zuvic (born 18 October 1974) is an Argentine politician. She served as a member of the Chamber of Deputies from 2019 to 2023. She is also a member of the Mercosur parliament for Argentina, representing the Cambiemos bloc as vice-president of the Civic Coalition ARI party.

== Personal life ==
Mariana Zuvic was born in Río Gallegos, Santa Cruz in 1974. Her father, Ángel Miguel Zuvic, was a pianist and businessman who had presided the Chamber of Commerce of the Santa Cruz province. She attended public elementary and secondary schools in Santa Cruz before enrolling in Pompeu Fabra University in Barcelona to study political science. She and Argentine businessman and Santa Cruz senator Eduardo Raúl Costa [es] lived together as romantic partners for 12 years before separating in 2019, with Zuvic citing "economic violence" as the reason. They have two children. Despite being referred to as Costa's wife, Zuvic said that she was not married. In an interview with La Voz, Zuvic claimed that her family had been bullied by former presidents Néstor Kirchner and his wife Cristina Fernández de Kirchner, so much so that her father, who committed suicide in 2019, went deaf after a fight with Néstor.

== Political career ==
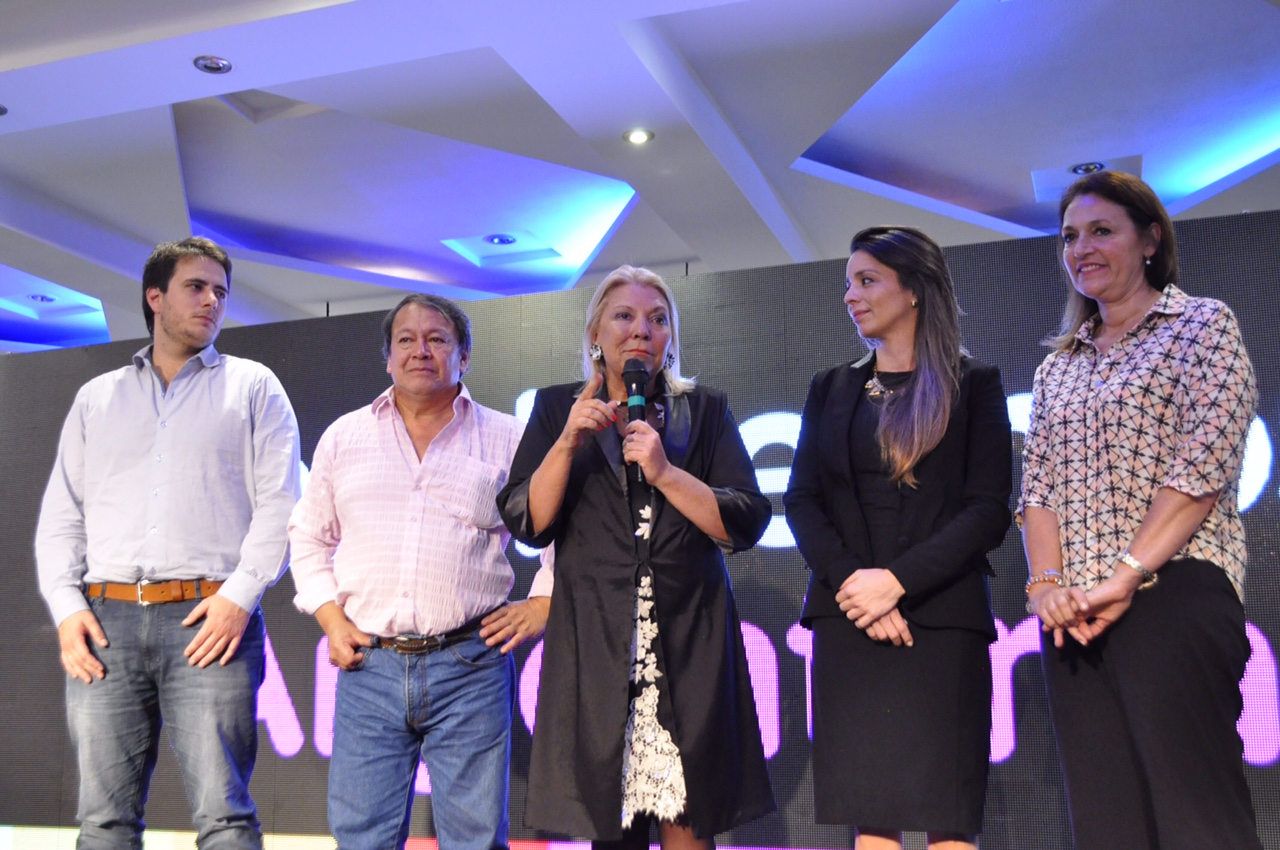
Zuvic, Elisa Carrió and other politicians from Cambiemos in 2017.

Zuvic entered politics in 2007 and, with the help of Civic Coalition ARI leader Elisa Carrió, founded the Santa Cruz faction of the party to offer an alternative to Néstor Kirchner's corrupt governance, which had ruled the province for more than two decades.

She spent much of her career uncovering the Kirchners' corruption in her native Santa Cruz. In 2018, Zuvic published her debut book The Origin: An intimate history of the making of Néstor and Cristina Kirchner as Santa Cruz politicians (El origen: Historia íntima del nacimiento de Néstor y Cristina en Santa Cruz como políticos), in which she revealed the "institutional destruction, social decomposition, and corruption" that the presidential couple had inflicted on her native Santa Cruz in first-person narrative.

She is a close friend of Argentine lawmaker Elisa Carrió, who Zuvic said had been influential in the formative years of her political career.
