= Delia Bisutti =

Argentine centre-left politician

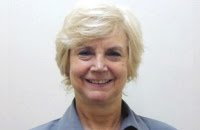

National Deputy
- In office 10 December 2005 – 10 December 2009
- Constituency: City of Buenos Aires

Personal details
- Born: March 31, 1947 (age 79)
- Party: Solidarity and Equality (Si)
- Website: http://www.deliabisutti.com.ar/

Delia Beatriz Bisutti (born March 31, 1947) is an Argentine centre-left politician who was a member of the Argentine Chamber of Deputies representing Buenos Aires from 2005 to 2009.

Bisutti was born in Buenos Aires and became a teacher after studying at the National University of Quilmes. From an early age she took an active role in trade unions, serving as a union delegate from 1970 to 1989. In 1977, during the Dirty War, she was detained by the military government and imprisoned in the concentration camp known as the 'Sheraton'. Her husband was also taken and disappeared, presumed dead.

In 1989 Bisutti became secretary general of the teachers' union, Unión de Trabajadores de la Educación (UTE), part of CTERA and the CTA (independent trade unions). She sat on CTERA's national committee. From 1995 she was a member of the executive of the Buenos Aires left-wing party, the Frente Grande, and in 1997 she was elected to the city legislature for the party as part of FrePaSo, where she presided over several committees including economic development.

Bisutti had been a critic of FrePaSo's alliance with the Radical Civic Union. In 2001, she joined the new centre-left party, Support for an Egalitarian Republic (ARI) and sat on the party's city executive. In 2003 she led the ARI block in the Buenos Aires legislature. Later that year she resigned her seat to take a junior role in the city government, within the education department, serving until January 2005.

Bisutti was elected a deputy for ARI in the October 2005 elections. Following ARI's integration into the Civic Coalition in 2007, Bisutti and a number of her colleagues left the party in protest against ARI's courting of more centrist figures. Initially forming a separate block in Congress known as the Autonomous ARI, in May 2008 they announced the formation of a new party, Solidarity and Equality, Si.
