= Rubén Giustiniani =

Argentine politician

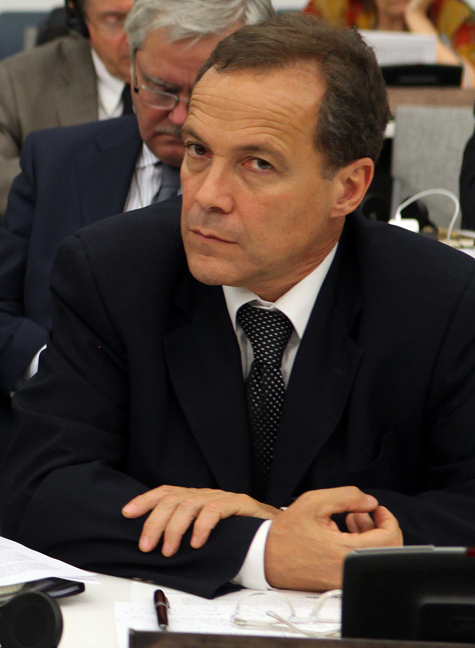

National Senator
- In office 10 December 2003 – 10 December 2015
- Constituency: Santa Fe Province

Personal details
- Born: November 3, 1955 (age 70) Rosario, Santa Fe
- Party: Socialist Party
- Education: National University of Rosario
- Profession: Civil engineer

Rubén Héctor Giustiniani (born November 3, 1955, in Rosario) is an Argentine politician from the Socialist Party (PS), who was National Senator representing Santa Fe Province from 2003 to 2015. An engineer by occupation, he also served as president of the Socialist Party.

Giustiniani was a National Deputy from 1997 to 2003, when he was elected senator for the minority. He was the first Socialist to become a member of the upper house of Congress since Alfredo Palacios (in 1960). In 2007, he was a candidate for the vice-presidency of Argentina, accompanying Elisa Carrió, in the general election held on 28 October 2007, in which he and Carrió gained second place.
