= Solidarity and Equality =

Solidarity and Equality Solidaridad e Igualdad Sí
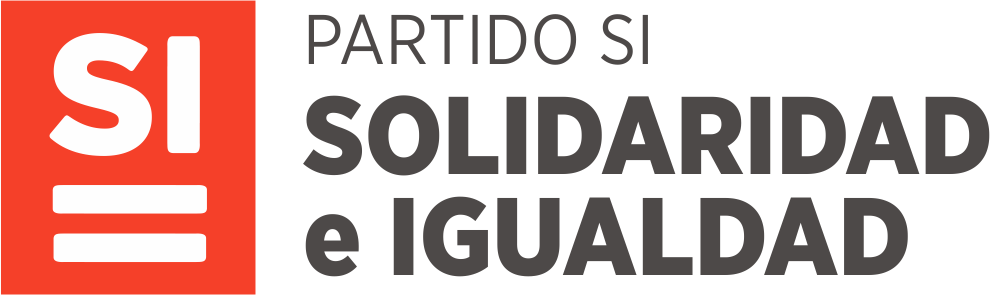
- Leader: Carlos Raimundi & Eduardo Macaluse
- Founded: 2008
- Ideology: Progressivism; Social democracy
- Political position: Centre-left

Solidarity and Equality (Spanish: Solidaridad e Igualdad - SI, or simply SI) is a centre-left Argentine political party, founded in 2008 as a splinter from ARI.

As part of building a broader coalition ahead of the 2007 elections, the ARI leader Elisa Carrió reached out to centrist figures such as Patricia Bullrich and María Eugenia Estenssoro, who was elected Senator for Buenos Aires. This proved controversial in ARI ranks and several national legislators formed a separate block called the Autonomous ARI in Congress.

In May 2008, the block, led by Eduardo Macaluse, announced that they were forming a new party, Sí. The other legislators joining Sí were Carlos Raimundi, Leonardo Gorbacz, Delia Bisutti, Nelida Belous, Verónica Venas, Emilio García Méndez, Lidia Naim and María América González. Senator María Rosa Díaz also appeared at the launch of Sí. The grouping has formed a congressional block with the dissident ARI members from Tierra del Fuego.
