= María Eugenia Estenssoro =

Bolivian politician and activist

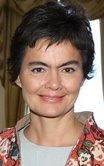

Legislator of the City of Buenos Aires
- In office 10 December 2013 – 10 December 2015
- In office 10 December 2003 – 10 December 2007

National Senator
- In office 10 December 2007 – 10 December 2013
- Constituency: City of Buenos Aires

Personal details
- Born: 15 April 1958 (age 68) La Paz, Bolivia
- Party: Civic Coalition
- Other political affiliations: Broad Front UNEN (2013-2015); Broad Progressive Front (2011-2013)

María Eugenia Estenssoro (born 15 April 1958) is a Bolivian Argentine politician, journalist and activist for women's rights. She represented the city of Buenos Aires in the Argentine Senate from 2007 to 2013.

Estenssoro was born in La Paz. Her great-grandfather is credited with discovering oil in Bolivia and her grandfather founded the national oil company, YPFB. Her family also includes two former Presidents of Bolivia, Víctor Paz Estenssoro and Hugo Banzer. Her parents came to Argentina with her in 1964, and her father ran the Argentine oil company, YPF. She was raised in San Isidro, Buenos Aires and studied at the Northlands School. At 16 she continued her education in the United States, studying at Smith College, Massachusetts, and then in France at the Sorbonne and the Institut d'Études Politiques de Paris. She completed a postgraduate course in books and magazines at Harvard and a teaching course at Columbia University.

In May 1983 Estenssoro returned to Argentina. She began work at the magazine El Porteño and also worked for Time magazine, The Wall Street Journal and other US publications. She became editor of Mercado and then economics editor of Noticias. She founded a women's magazine and also worked in television.

Estenssoro was elected to the Buenos Aires city legislature in 2003 as an independent on the list of liberal party Recreate for Growth, under the wing of Patricia Bullrich. She was the first legislator of Bolivian descent in a city with a large Bolivian population. Later she allied with the ARI party. In 2007 she became a senator for the Civic Coalition. Her alliance with the ARI party, as a centre-right politician, provoked a crisis within ARI ranks, with several ARI deputies resigning to form a 'Autonomous ARI' block in the Argentine Congress.
