= Civic Coalition ARI =

Political party in Argentina

Civic Coalition ARI Coalición Cívica ARI
- Abbreviation: CC-ARI
- Leader: Elisa Carrió
- President: Maximiliano Ferraro
- Vice President: Mariana Zuvic
- Chamber Leader: Juan Manuel López
- Founded: 2002; 24 years ago
- Split from: Radical Civic Union
- Headquarters: Av. Rivadavia 1479, C1033AAE, Buenos Aires
- Membership (2017): ▲51,646 (6th)
- Ideology: Liberalism; Civic humanism; Anti-corruption; Developmentalism; Social liberalism; Conservatism
- Political position: Centre; Factions: Center-right to center-left
- Parliamentary group: Hacemos Federal Coalition (HCF)
- Colors: Light blue
- Seats in the Chamber of Deputies: 2 / 257
- Seats in the Senate: 0 / 72
- Province Governors: 0 / 24

Website
- CoalicionCivicaARI.org.ar

Civic Coalition ARI (Spanish: Coalición Cívica ARI, CC-ARI), until October 2009 known as Support for an Egalitarian Republic (Spanish: Afirmación para una República Igualitaria, ARI), is a centrist political party in Argentina founded in 2002 by Elisa Carrió.

It is a member of Cambiemos since 2015, along with centrist and centre-right parties.

Many consider it a social liberal and an innovative party. It offers a political option located in the centre, where the defense of republican institutions and democratic freedoms prevails. It groups together modern social democrats, who accept the "Fundamentals of the economy" and publicly condemn the dictatorship of Fidel Castro; together with democratic liberals, supporters of civil liberties that clearly separate them from conservatives, primarily defenders of the rule of law and pragmatists.

== Creation and history ==
Elisa Carrió, a former Radical Civic Union (UCR) politician, created the ARI after the breakup of the government alliance that brought Fernando de la Rúa to the presidency in 1999.

The 2001 elections gave ARI 17 of the 257 seats in the Argentine Chamber of Deputies, and one senator. Carrió got a 14.1% share of the vote in the 2003 presidential elections. In the 2005 elections, ARI won eight seats. In the 2007 elections, ARI won the governorship of the deep-south Province of Tierra del Fuego, when Fabiana Rios, an ARI deputy, defeated the pro-government candidate Hugo Cóccaro, on June 24, 2007. Tierra del Fuego is currently (as of 2008) the first and only province ruled by ARI.

The party has established itself as a major force in the City of Buenos Aires, in Buenos Aires Province, and in the aforementioned Province of Tierra del Fuego.

In the presidential elections of 2007, Carrió came second, heading the Civic Coalition with Rubén Giustiniani. She obtained about 23% of the vote, coming in a second behind Cristina Fernández de Kirchner. She won the majority vote in two of the three largest cities of Argentina: Buenos Aires and Rosario, but she suffered a larger defeat in Buenos Aires Province, the most populated district, and could not force a run-off election. ARI did however win four Senate seats (2 of the City of Buenos Aires and 2 of Tierra del Fuego) and a considerable number of seats in the Argentine Chamber of Deputies, with further Congress seats for other members of the Coalition.

=== Current status ===
On 31 January 2015, through their personal accounts on social networks, Mauricio Macri and Elisa Carrió simultaneously announced that they "sealed the unity." Each one headed a formula of his same party in the primaries of August; the winner of the internship competed in the national generals on October.

== 2007 split ==
As part of building a broader coalition ahead of the 2007 elections, Carrió reached out to centre-right figures such as Patricia Bullrich and María Eugenia Estenssoro, who was elected Senator for Buenos Aires. This proved controversial in ARI ranks and some national legislators formed a separate block called the Autonomous ARI in Congress. In May 2008, the block, led by Eduardo Macaluse, announced that they were forming a new party, Solidarity and Equality (Solidaridad e Igualdad – SI). Others who left ARI were Carlos Raimundi, Leonardo Gorbacz, Delia Bisutti, Nélida Belous, Verónica Venas, Emilio García Méndez, Lidia Naim and María América González. Senator María Rosa Díaz also appeared at the launch of SI. Several of the legislators that created the new party had won their seats in the 2007 election as part of the Civic Coalition, which they later opposed. The ARI deputies from Tierra del Fuego sit with the SI members in a separate block in the Chamber of Deputies. Subsequently, Senators María Rosa Díaz and José Carlos Martínez left ARI altogether in March 2009.

In October 2009, the official name was changed into Partido Coalición Cívica para la Afirmación de una República Igualitaria (Civic Coalition Party for the Support of an Egalitarian Republic). Usually it is shortened to Coalición Cívica ARI (Civic Coalition ARI).

== Ideology and values ==
According to Maximiliano Ferraro, its national chairman, "the Civic Coalition and Lilita Carrió represent values and ideas that are linked to the republic, liberal democracy, humanism, the ethics of otherness and ecumenism."

Elisa Carrió is considered a liberal, Christian and heterodox politician in Argentina.

Gregorio Hernández Maqueda, chairman of CC-ARI in the province of Córdoba, declared that his vigilance is the fulfillment of the maximum alliance agreed by the people and for the people: the Constitution. He affirms that the other side of poverty is not lack of resources or wars, but corruption. He believes that Mauricio Macri has achieved a government that "brought freedom where there was only authoritarianism, truth where there was only lies and hope where there was only resignation."

In the Civic Coalition, of its 10 members, only one Juan Manuel López voted in favor of legalization of abortion. The most outraged by the result of the vote was Elisa Carrió, who threatened to break the coalition. His words fell lousy in the leadership of Cambiemos.

Being an opponent, during the conflict between ruralists and the government, Carrió said that the "way out is the countryside."

== See also ==
- Category:Civic Coalition ARI politicians
