= Juntos por el Cambio =

Argentine political coalition

Together for Change Juntos por el Cambio
- Abbreviation: JxC
- Party Presidents: Patricia Bullrich; Gerardo Morales; Maximiliano Ferraro; Ricardo López Murphy; Miguel Ángel Pichetto
- Deputies Leader: Mario Negri
- Senate Leader: Alfredo Cornejo
- Founder: Mauricio Macri; Elisa Carrió; Ernesto Sanz
- Founded: 15 June 2015; 11 years ago as Cambiemos; 12 June 2019; 7 years ago as Juntos por el Cambio
- Dissolved: 27 December 2023; 2 years ago
- Ideology: Liberalism; Factions: Liberal conservatism; Social liberalism; Conservative liberalism
- Political position: Centre to centre-right
- Colours: Yellow
- Member parties: 13 (full list): Republican Proposal; Radical Civic Union; Civic Coalition ARI; Civic Front of Córdoba; GEN Party; Democratic Progressive Party; Integration and Development Movement; Popular Union; UNIR Constitutional Nationalist Party; Republican Peronism; Dialogue Party; United Republicans; Public Trust

Website
- jxc.com.ar

Juntos por el Cambio (JxC, English: Together for Change) was a political coalition in Argentina. A liberal coalition, it was created in 2015 as Cambiemos (English: Let's Change), and renamed in 2019. It was composed of Republican Proposal, Radical Civic Union, Civic Coalition ARI and United Republicans.

These three parties respectively nominated Mauricio Macri, Ernesto Sanz, and Elisa Carrió as their representatives in the August 2015 primary elections, which were held to choose which candidate would run in the 2015 presidential election on 25 October. On 9 August, Macri was elected as the candidate who would represent Cambiemos in the presidential election; on 22 November, where he won in second round by 51%.

== Creation ==
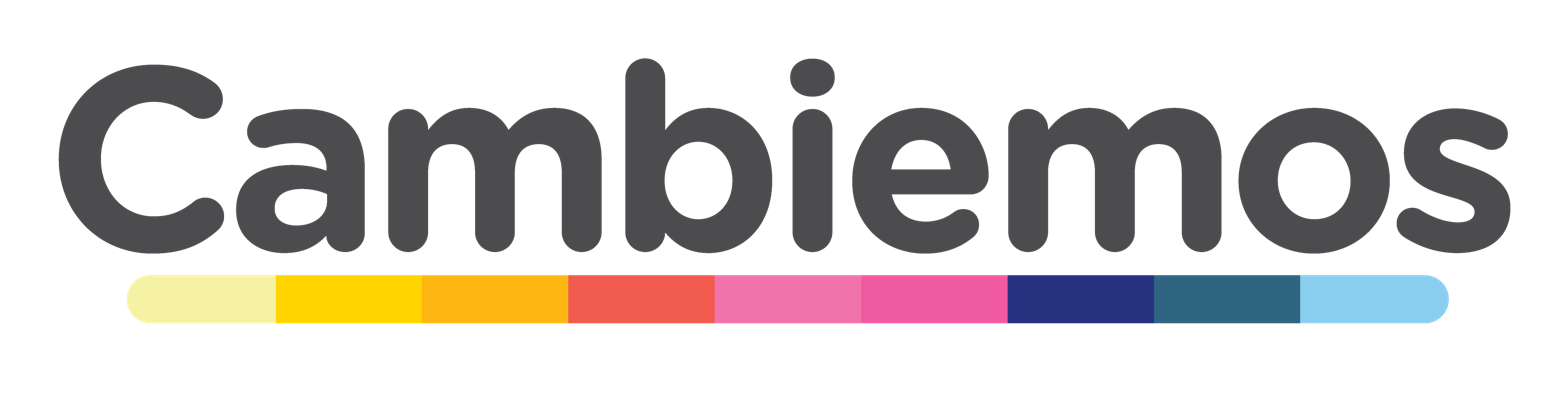
Cambiemos official logo.

Initially, the pre-candidates Mauricio Macri, Daniel Scioli, and Sergio Massa had a triple tie in the polls for the 2015 presidential election. Scioli was the candidate of the Front for Victory, the ruling party at the time.

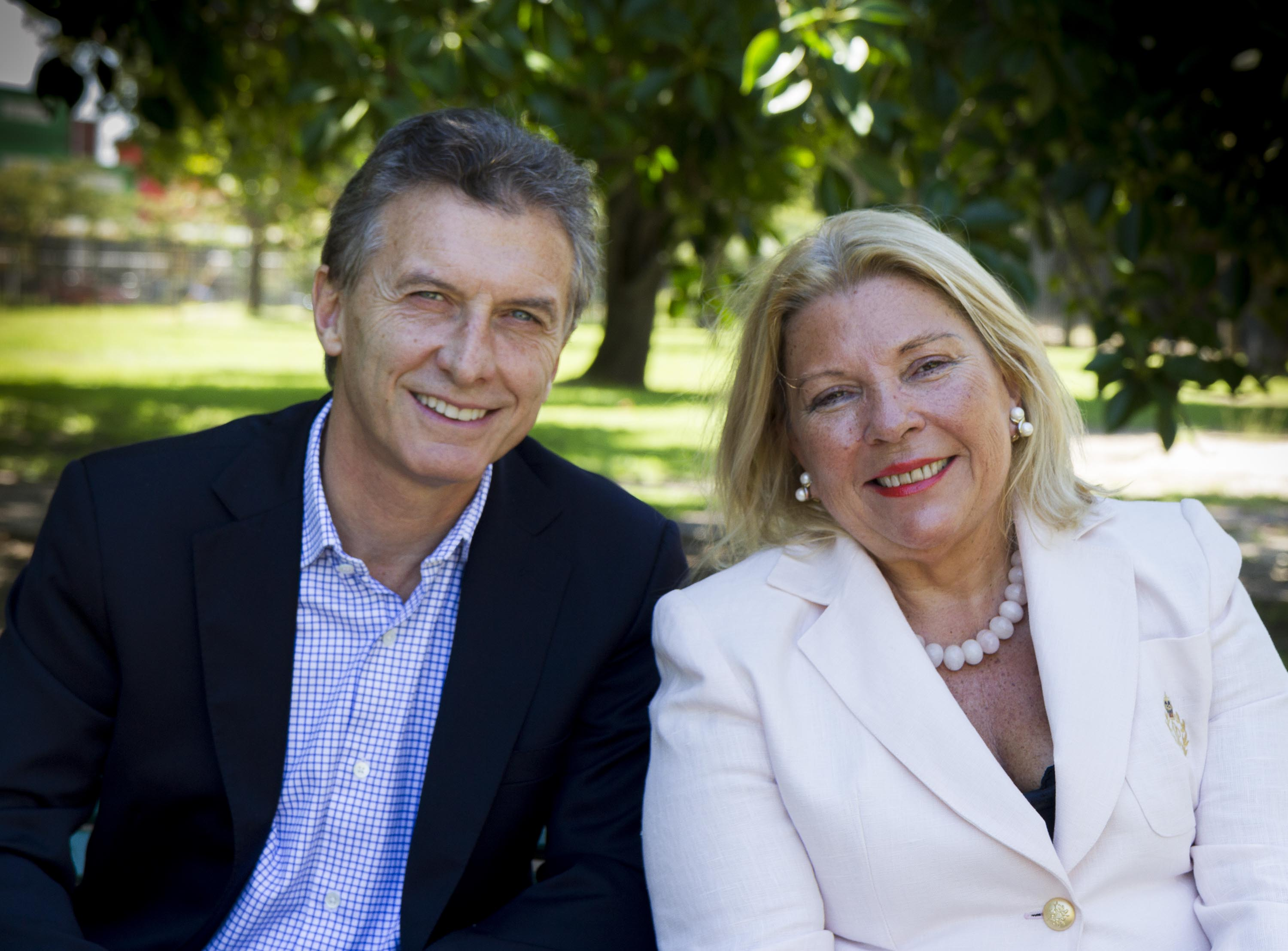
Macri and Carrió prepared a launch photo of their alliance.

The other parties created a political coalition, the Broad Front UNEN. Elisa Carrió, leader of the Civic Coalition, left UNEN and joined a coalition with Macri's PRO instead. Both of them would run in the primary elections.

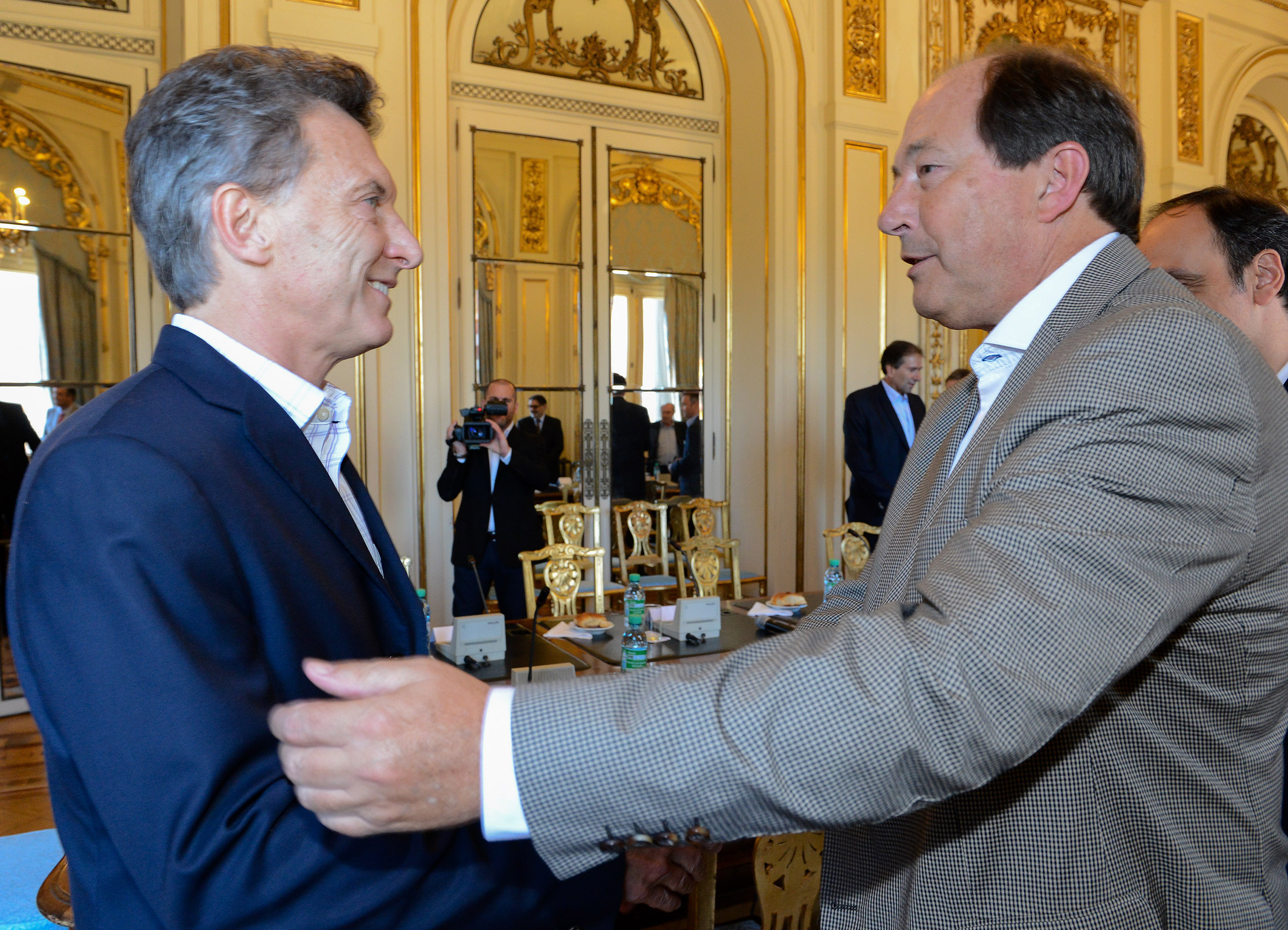
Sanz designed an alliance between PRO and UCR

The Radical Civic Union was divided: Ernesto Sanz proposed to join Macri as well, and Julio Cobos proposed to stay in UNEN. The party held a convention to decide what to do, and Sanz's proposal prevailed. Thus, the UCR left UNEN and joined the PRO-CC.

The new coalition was named "Cambiemos", suggesting a change from the 12-year long rule of center-left Kirchnerists.

== History ==
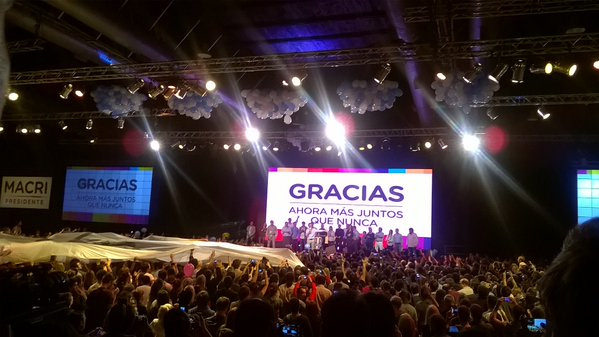
First speech of the president-elect Macri

Macri, Sanz, and Carrió ran to be the nominee in the primary elections with Macri winning by a wide margin. He won the presidential election against the Kirchnerite candidate Daniel Scioli in a ballotage. In lower-level posts, Horacio Rodríguez Larreta was elected as Macri's replacement, keeping the City of Buenos Aires under coalition control. Alfredo Cornejo and Gerardo Morales became governors of Mendoza and Jujuy Provinces, respectively. María Eugenia Vidal defeated Aníbal Fernández and became the governor of the populous Buenos Aires Province, ending 28 years of Peronist control.

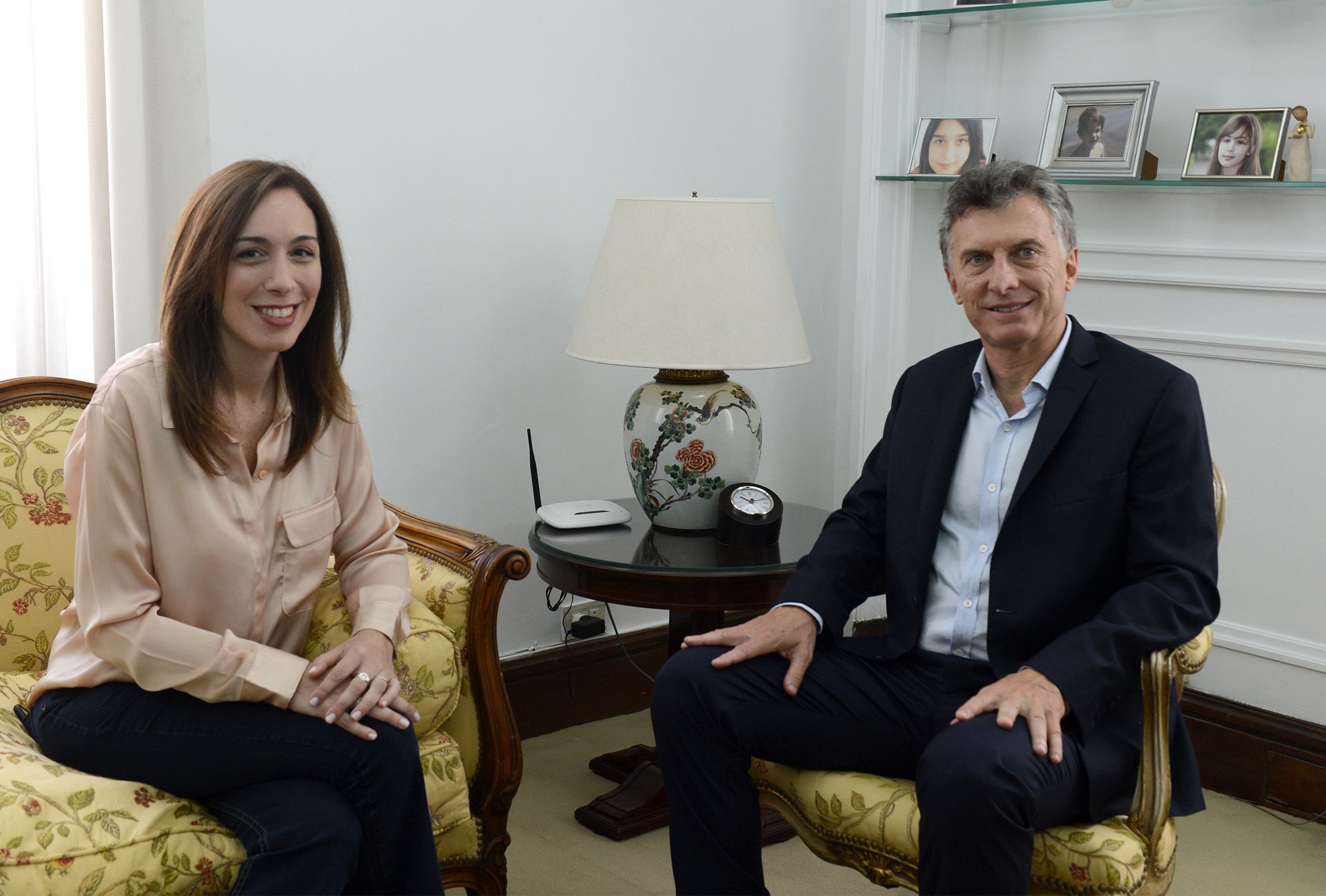
Macri and the governor-elect, Maria Eugenia Vidal

The 2017 Argentine legislative election renewed a third of the seats in the Senate and half in the Chamber of Deputies. The result was a victory for the ruling Cambiemos alliance, being the most voted force in 13 of the 24 districts.

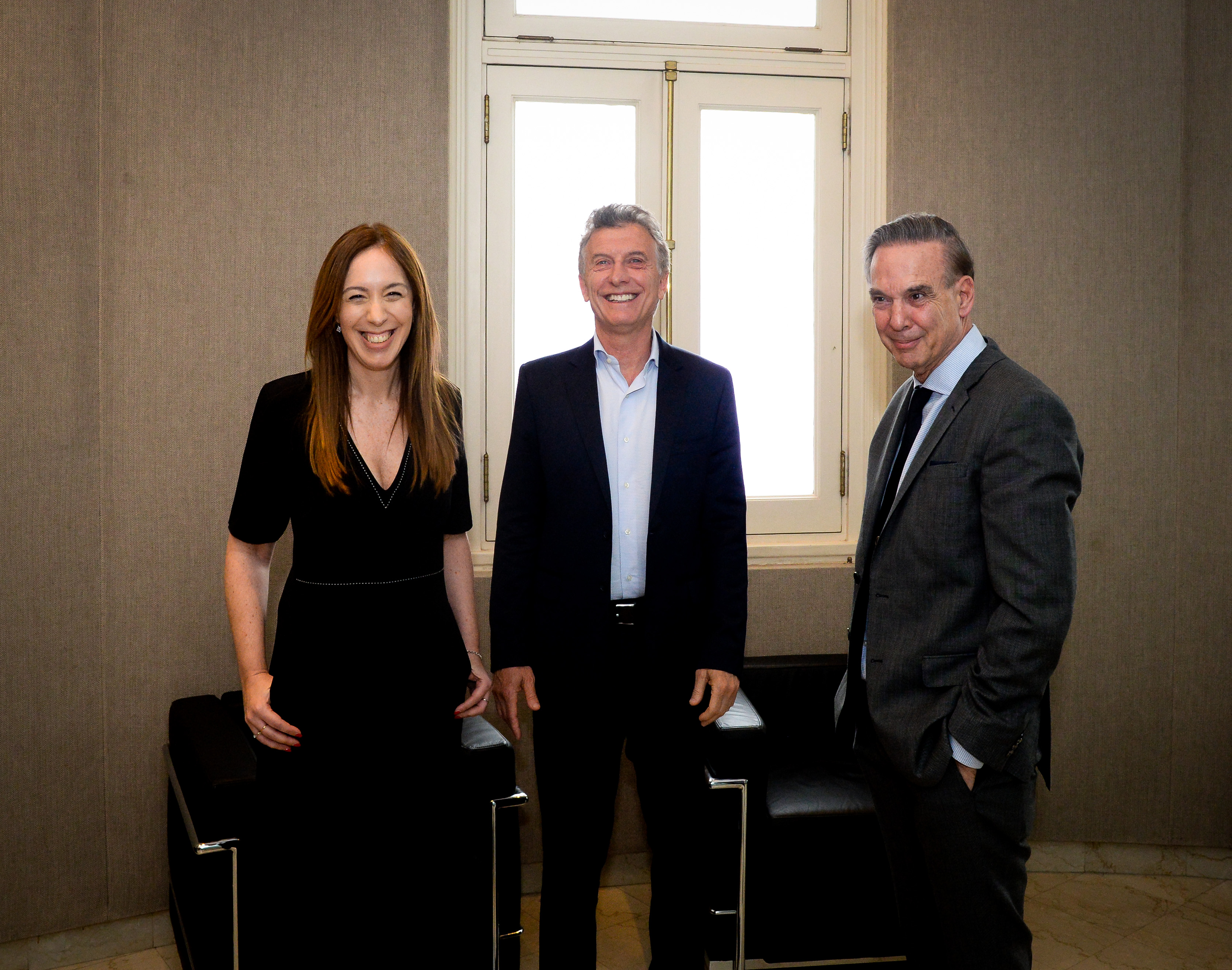
Macri, Vidal and the new member, Pichetto

In June 2019, an extension of the Cambiemos alliance was made: it is renamed Together for Change, by adding to Federal Peronism led by Miguel Ángel Pichetto, who would share the presidential formula of space together with Mauricio Macri. In the 2019 presidential elections, JxC was in second place, with 40% of the votes, behind Alberto Fernández, who won first round with 48% of the votes.

In the province of Buenos Aires, Governor María Eugenia Vidal sought re-election but was defeated by the candidate of the Frente de Todos, Axel Kicillof, who won 52% of the votes against 38% obtained by JxC.

In the City of Buenos Aires, Horacio Rodríguez Larreta joins the Radical Civic Union and the Socialist Party to the district alliance and is reelected as Chief of Government with 56% of the votes in the first round.

On 10 December 2019, the Centre-Left Alberto Fernández of the Justicialist Party was inaugurated President, after defeating the incumbent Mauricio Macri in the 2019 Argentine general election.

On 14 November 2021, the center-left coalition of Argentina's ruling Peronist party, Frente de Todos (Front for Everyone), lost its majority in Congress for the first time in almost 40 years in midterm legislative elections. The election victory of Juntos por el Cambio meant a tough final two years in office for President Alberto Fernández. Losing control of the Senate made it difficult for him to make key appointments, including to the judiciary. It also forced him to negotiate with the opposition every initiative he sends to the legislature.

In 2023 Argentine general election, Patricia Bullrich, the candidate of Juntos por el Cambio, was defeated in the first round. After the election, Patricia Bullrich returned to government as security minister in president Javier Milei's Cabinet in December 2023. Bullrich also stated that she will step down both as the leader of Juntos por el Cambio and her own Republican proposal (PRO) party.

== Positions ==
Cambiemos is a big tent coalition, variously described as centrist, to centre-right. The coalition describes itself as anti-populist and liberal.

Former President and coalition leader Mauricio Macri has been described as a conservative. Macri said he would tear up Argentina's memorandum of understanding with Iran, seek Venezuela’s exclusion from the regional free trade association Mercosur and ease away from a fixed exchange rate with the dollar. This is the "change of an era we need to be in the world", he declared at a press conference. He aligned the country with gradualist neoliberalism and re-opened Argentina to international markets by lifting currency controls, restructuring sovereign debt, and pressing free-market solutions.

Macri said he would seek more sweeping reforms for Argentina after his governing coalition scored a resounding victory in 2017 congressional elections. Macri told reporters Argentinians should expect reforms in tax, education and labor, without providing details. The conservative leader had been pushing a free-market reform agenda to try to overhaul Argentina's economy. His presidency has been criticized for failing to materially reform the Argentine economy, while receiving praise for leaving a legacy of anti-corruption, and increasing Argentina's sovereign marketability.

=== Domestic policies ===
The members of Cambiemos were constituted to "promote economic development, the strengthening of democracy and the republican system, the independence of justice, the quality of education, social solidarity, and the personal happiness of the inhabitants of the Argentine Republic."

=== Economic policies ===
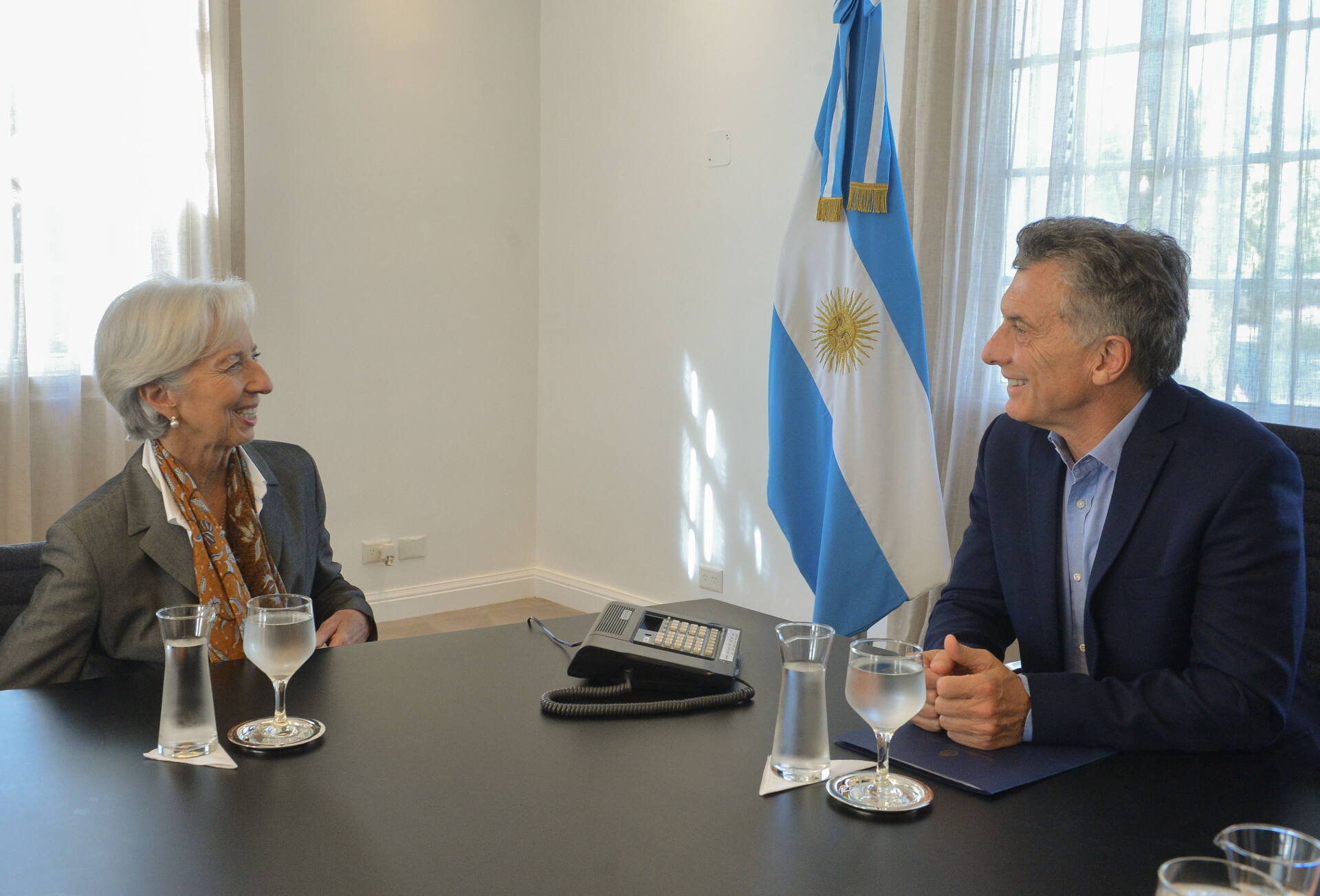
Macri and IMF Managing Director, Christine Lagarde.

Mauricio Macri received a country with huge economic problems, and sought to reverse things. Quickly, moved from a fixed exchange-rate system to a floating one, removed taxes on exports and reduced subsidies on energy, to reduce the fiscal deficit.

Macri avoided the use of shock therapy and introduced the changes in a gradual way.

In April 2016, he negotiated with the vulture fund and ended the default to return to the international capital markets.

Until January 2018, the gradualist system was working well, although at a slower pace than needed.

Since May 2018, as part of an agreement with the International Monetary Fund, the government accelerated the austerity plans, aiming to completely remove the fiscal deficit.

=== Social policies ===
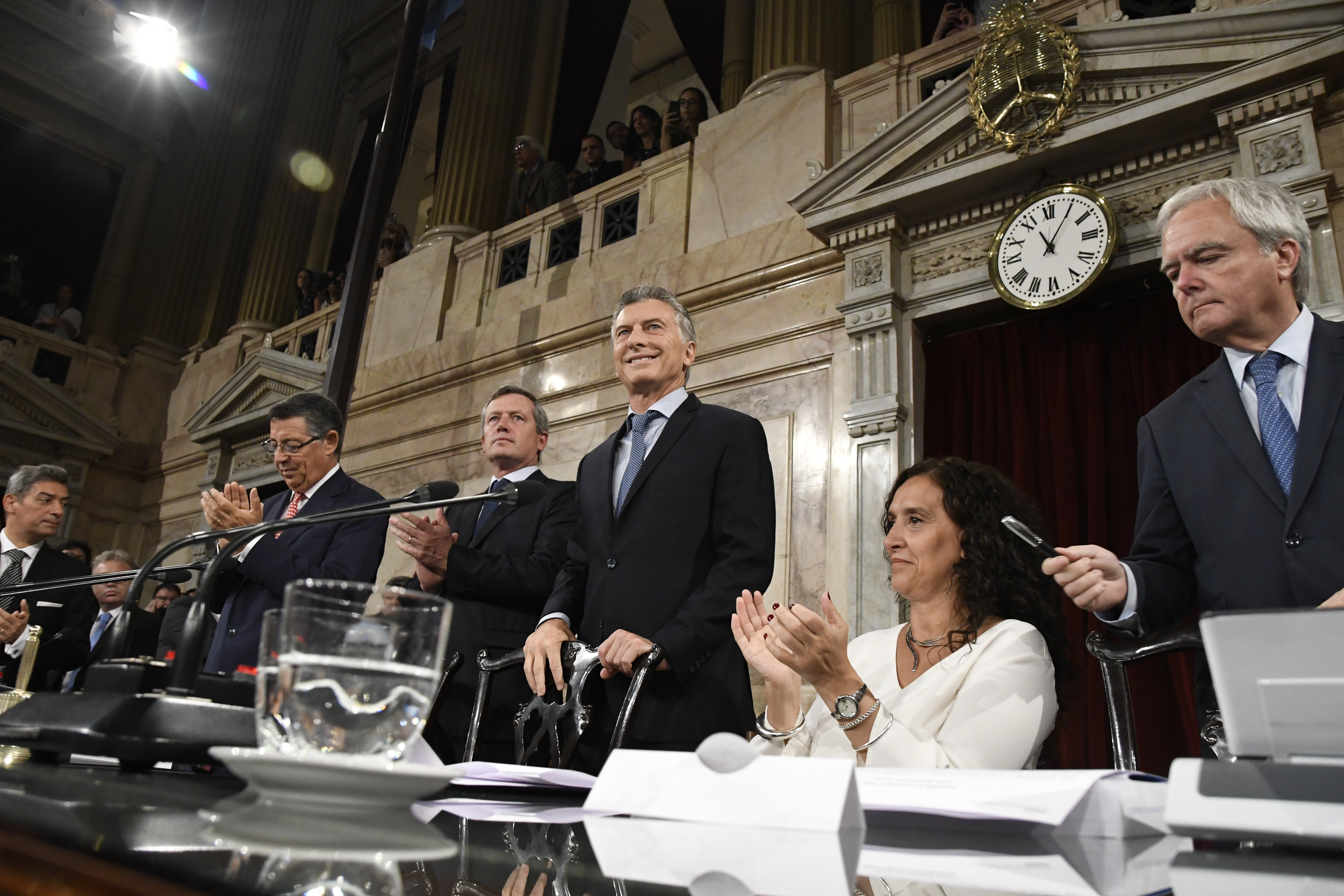
Macri with the members of Cambiemos Gabriela Michetti, Federico Pinedo and Emilio Monzó at the Argentine Congress.

Domestically, he pursued moderate socially liberal policies, liberalized the energy sector, and combatted public corruption.

Macri named two Supreme Court justices.

President Mauricio Macri encouraged the discussion of an abortion law during the 2018 opening of regular sessions of the National Congress of Argentina. The bill, called "Voluntary termination of pregnancy", divided the coalition, that had no official position and the legislators voted according their beliefs.

Mauricio Macri, Maria Eugenia Vidal, Horacio Rodríguez Larreta, Elisa Carrió, and ministers Marcos Peña, Rogelio Frigerio, Esteban Bullrich, etc., are anti-abortion; Martin Lousteau, Mario Negri, Luis Petcoff Naidenoff and ministers Sergio Rubinstein, Patricia Bullrich, Sergio Bergman, Juan José Aranguren, etc.; are pro-abortion.

In this coalition of 108 members, the rejection of the project was imposed, with 65 negative votes compared to 42 positive.

Within the ruling alliance, the PRO prevailed with the negative vote (37) - it should be remembered that President Mauricio Macri had expressed himself "in favor of life" - while 17 voted for the positive. In radicalism, 24 supported the initiative, 16 rejected it. In the Civic Coalition, of its 10 members, only Juan Manuel López voted in favor.

When the bill was brought up again in late 2020, the coalition split, with 69 voting against and 42 in favour. In the PRO 40 members voted against while only 11 voted in favour, while in the Civic Coalition 4 supported the bill and 9 voted against. In contrast the radicals saw a greater endorsement of the bill, having 27 of its members in support and only 18 against.

In the senate, the coalition was divided more evenly, with 11 members voting in favour and 14 against. It also resulted in an inversion of party support, with a majority of PRO voting favourably (5 yes and 3 no), while the radicals voted 9 against and 5 in favour. Other minor parties in JxC on both chambers also voted in different positions.

=== Foreign policy ===
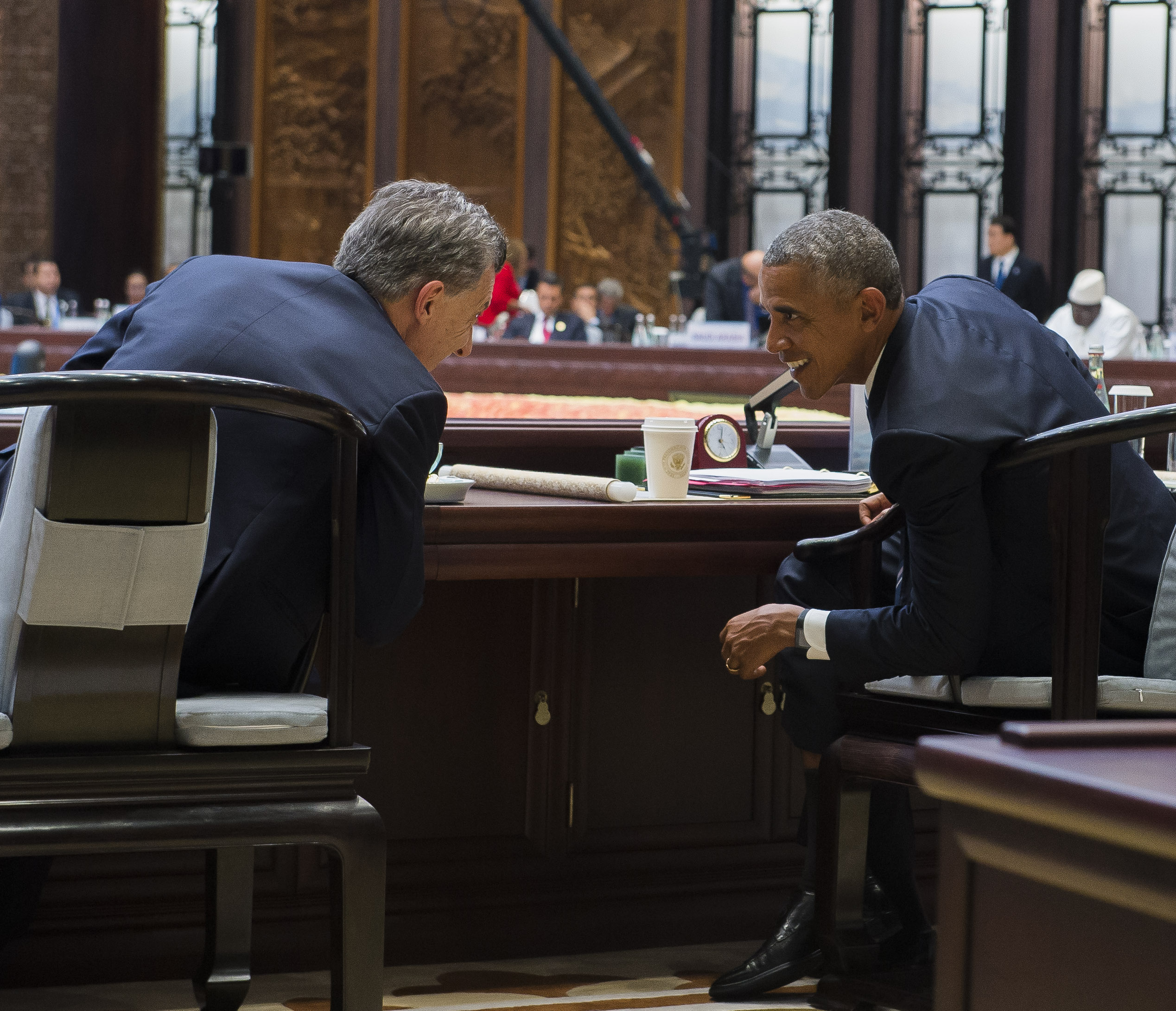
Macri and U.S President Barack Obama.

Cambiemos strongly opposes the regime of Nicolás Maduro in Venezuela for human rights abuses and calls for a restoration of democracy in the country. It recognized Juan Guaidó, who was elected President of Venezuela by the National Assembly during the Venezuelan presidential crisis of 2019.

Macri improved the relations with the United States and from Mercosur achieved a free trade agreement with the European Union and closer ties with the Pacific Alliance.

Macri and his Foreign Minister Susana Malcorra endorsed Democrat Hillary Clinton in the 2016 US presidential election, which was won by Republican Donald Trump.

Mauricio Macri said he wanted to start a "new kind of relationship" with the United Kingdom over the Falkland Islands as he tried to move his country towards a centrist position in world affairs.

During the first week in office, Macri annulled the Memorandum of understanding between Argentina and Iran, which would have established a joint investigation into the 1994 AMIA bombing, a terrorist attack on a Jewish organization in Buenos Aires for which Argentina blamed Hezbollah and Iran.

== Presidents ==
President	Photo	District	Presidency start date	Presidency end date	Time in office
Mauricio Macri (b. 1959)		Buenos Aires	10 December 2015	10 December 2019	4 years, 0 days

== Members ==
Party	Leader	Ideology
Republican Proposal	Patricia Bullrich	Liberal conservatism
Radical Civic Union	Alfredo Cornejo	Social liberalism
Coalición Cívica ARI	Maximiliano Ferraro	Liberalism
Republican Peronism	Miguel Ángel Pichetto	Federal Peronism
GEN Party	Margarita Stolbizer	Social democracy
Democratic Progressive Party	Ana Copes	Social liberalism
Public Trust	Graciela Ocaña	Anti-corruption
Integration and Development Movement	Juan Pablo Carrique	Developmentalism
Civic Front of Córdoba	Luis Juez	Progressivism
Popular Union	Graciela Devita	Federal Peronism
Dialogue Party	Emilio Monzó	Federal Peronism
UNIR Constitutional Nationalist Party	Alberto Asseff	National conservatism
United Republicans	Ricardo López Murphy	Conservative liberalism

== Electoral performance ==
=== President ===
Election	Candidate	First round		Second round		Result
Election	Candidate	Votes	%	Votes	%	Result
2015	Mauricio Macri	8,601,131	34.15 (#2)	12,988,349	51.34 (#1)	Won
2019	Mauricio Macri	10,811,586	40.28 (#2)	—N/a		Lost
2023	Patricia Bullrich	6,379,023	23.81 (#3)	—N/a		Lost

=== Legislative elections ===
==== Chamber of Deputies ====
Election year	votes	%	seats won	Position
2015	8,230,605	35.11	47 / 130	Minority government
2017	10,261,407	41.75	64 / 127	Minority government
2019	10,347,605	40.36	56 / 130	Opposition
2021	9,832,813	41.89	61 / 127	Opposition
2023	6,412,133	26.12	32 / 130	Confidence and supply

==== Senate ====
Election year	votes	%	seats won	Position
2015	2,770,410	38.81	9 / 24	Minority Government
2017	4,864,886	41.01	12 / 24	Minority Government
2019	2,210,310	39.22	8 / 24	Opposition
2021	3,260,964	46.85	14 / 24	Opposition
2023	2,969,070	25.57	2 / 24	Confidence and supply
