= Elisa Carrió =

Argentine politician and lawyer

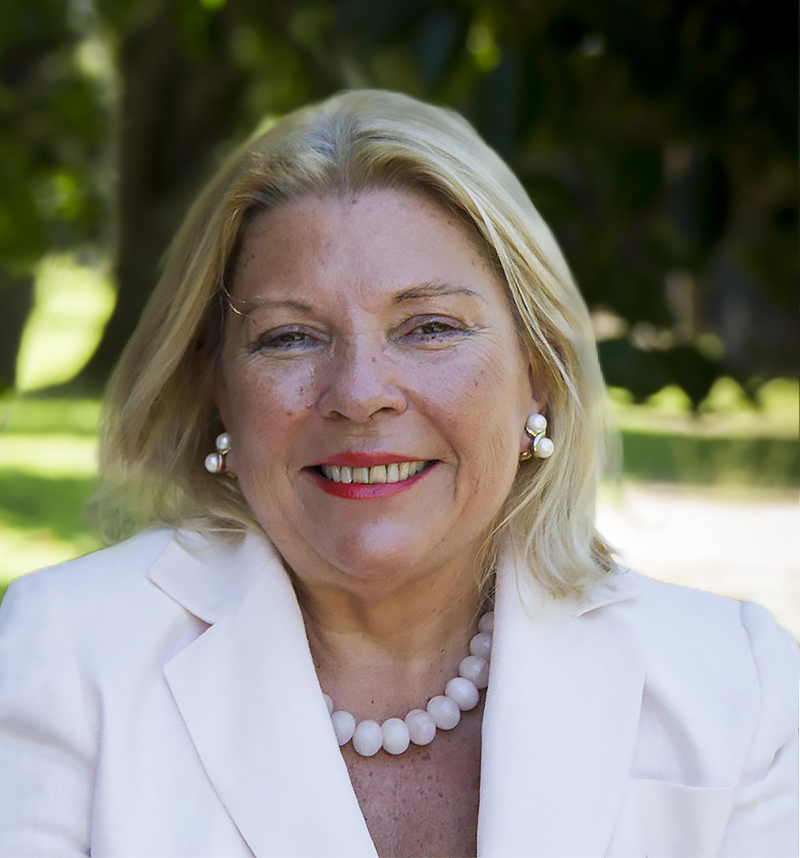
- Carrió in 2015

National Deputy
- In office 10 December 2009 – 1 March 2020
- Constituency: City of Buenos Aires
- In office 10 December 2005 – 14 March 2007
- Constituency: City of Buenos Aires
- In office 10 December 1995 – 10 December 2003
- Constituency: Chaco

Personal details
- Born: 26 December 1956 (age 69) Resistencia, Chaco, Argentina
- Party: Radical Civic Union (1995–2002); Civic Coalition ARI (since 2002)
- Other political affiliations: Alliance (1999–2001); Civic Coalition (2007–2011); FAP (2011–2013); Broad Front UNEN (2013–2015); Juntos por el Cambio (since 2015)
- Education: National University of the Northeast
- Profession: Lawyer

Elisa María Avelina "Lilita" Carrió (born 26 December 1956) is an Argentine lawyer, professor, and politician. She is the leader of Civic Coalition ARI, one of the founders of Cambiemos, and was National Deputy for Chaco Province and Buenos Aires. Carrió is considered a liberal, Christian, and heterodox politician in Argentina.

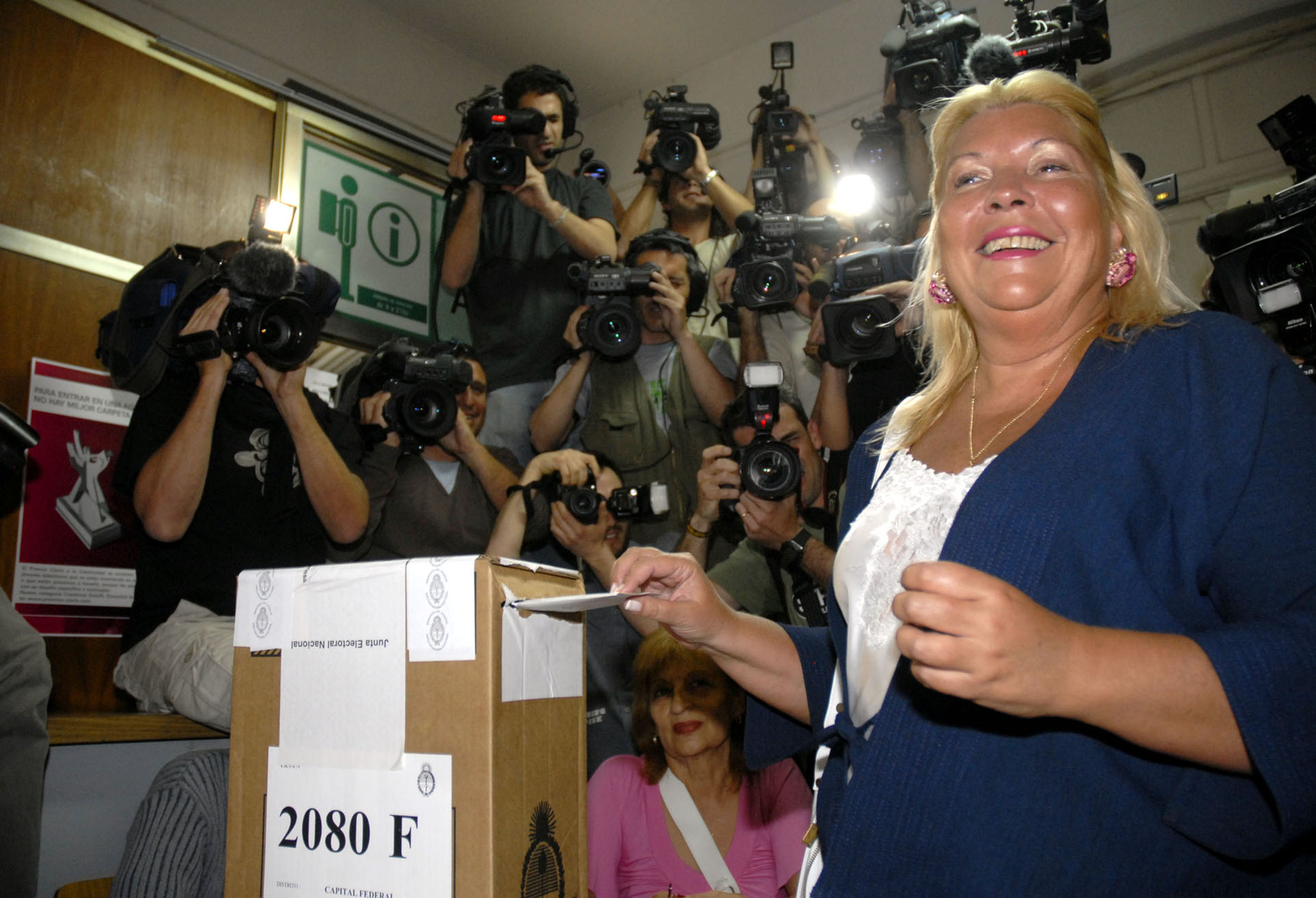
Carrió votes in the 2007 elections. She lost, but made history as the first female runner-up to another woman in a presidential race.

== Biography ==
Born in Resistencia, Chaco, in a traditional family, Carrió was a former teenage beauty queen. Her father, Rolando "Coco" Carrió, was a prominent Radical Civic Union politician. Her mother, María "Lela" Elisa Rodríguez, was a literature professor. She enrolled at the National University of the Northeast and earned a law degree in 1978 and later earned a graduate degree in Public Law at the National University of the Littoral. Carrió entered public service as a technical advisor to the Chaco Province Prosecutor's Office in 1979, and was appointed to the provincial Solicitor General's office in 1980.

She later taught constitutional law at her alma mater, and from 1986 to 1988 served as director of the human rights department of the University of Buenos Aires Law School. In 2004, she founded the Hannah Arendt Institute of Cultural and Political Education (Spanish: Hannah Arendt instituto de formación cultural y política), where she has taught ever since.

== Politics ==
Carrió entered politics at the request of her mentor, Raúl Alfonsín, was elected to the 1994 Constitutional Amendments Convention, during which she was a leading sponsor of Article 75, section 22, which mandated the adoption of international human rights treaties ratified by Argentina into the Argentine Constitution. She was elected to the Chamber of Deputies for her province, representing the centrist Radical Civic Union (UCR), in 1995, and in 1997, obtained passage of a bill giving constitutional authority to the international Treaty of Disappeared Persons.

She campaigned heavily for Fernando de la Rúa in 1999. Re-elected to Congress, Carrió earned growing publicity as the chair of the Congressional Committee on Corruption and Money Laundering after 1999, particularly during a series of exchanged accusations in 2001 between herself and Economy Minister Domingo Cavallo.

After the rupture in 2000 of the Alliance for Work, Justice and Education (which the UCR had formed in 1997 with Socialists and the Front for a Country in Solidarity), Carrió turned to the Democratic Socialist Party and other politicians with leftist leanings who were discontented in their parties, and formed an informal front, initially called "Argentinians for a Republic of Equals" (Argentinos por una República de Iguales), ARI. After dissensions, the socialists left, and so did Carrió and other figures from their original parties. Together, they formed a new party, called Alternative for a Republic of Equals (also Civic Coalition ARI), in 2002.

In the 2003 elections, Carrió ran for president with Mendoza deputy Gustavo Gutiérrez as the candidate for the Civic Coalition ARI party. Prior to running together, she had worked with him in the 2001 Money Laundering Investigation Commission (Spanish: Comisión investigadora de lavado de dinero). They ended up in the fourth place with about 16% of the votes, behind former president Carlos Menem, would-be president Néstor Kirchner, and minister of economy Ricardo López Murphy. After losing the election, she worked on securing the Civic Coalition ARI, which went through a major crisis during the 2003–07 Kirchner presidency, with members unable to settle their differences and several deputies leaving for the National Government. She returned to the Lower House of Congress in 2005, after winning a seat as a National Deputy for the Autonomous City of Buenos Aires with just over 20% of votes.

Carrió ran again for the Presidency on the 2007 elections, representing a front called the Civic Coalition. In March 2007 she resigned her seat in Congress to conduct the campaign. Together with her running mate Rubén Giustiniani (chairman of the Socialist Party), Carrió obtained about 23% of the vote, coming in a distant second after first lady Cristina Fernández de Kirchner. She won a majority in two of the three largest cities of Argentina (Buenos Aires and Rosario), but she suffered a larger defeat in Buenos Aires Province, the most populous district. Ultimately, Carrió lost to Cristina Fernández de Kirchner by a nearly 2-to-1 margin, and came up well short of forcing her into a ballotage. In Argentina, a presidential candidate can win an outright victory by either winning at least 45 percent of the vote, or 40 to 44 percent of the vote while finishing at least 10 points ahead of the runner-up.

Following the 2007 election, Carrió announced she would not be running for the presidency again, declaring that she would instead enhance her role as "leader of the opposition" and seek to become a member of or influence in a future administration following the 2011 elections. She was reunited ahead of the June 2009 mid-term elections with erstwhile allies, the UCR and Socialists, in the Civic and Social Agreement. This coalition yielded gains only for the UCR, however, and Carrió's reduced influence therein ended in her acrimonious departure from the group in August 2010. She later reconsidered her earlier decision to opt out of the 2011 presidential race, and on 12 December 2010, she announced her candidacy on the Civic Coalition/ARI ticket. Carrió received 1.8% of the vote in 23 October election, placing last in a field of seven candidates.

Carrió joined the Broad Front UNEN alliance upon its formation in June 2013, and was reelected to the Lower House on their ticket in elections that October. Her desire to fold UNEN into a coalition led by the PRO party, led to her break with UNEN in November 2014. The UCR also left the coalition and joined the PRO as well. The three parties became a new coalition, Cambiemos (Spanish: "Let's change"). She run for the presidency in the primary elections, and lost to Mauricio Macri. Macri won the 2015 general elections afterwards.

She voted against the legalization of abortion. After losing in the vote, Elisa Carrió left angry and warned: "Let it be clear to everyone Cambiemos, next time I'll break [ties]."

On 1 March 2020, she resigned as a national deputy.

== Personal life ==
Carrió always appears in public wearing a crucifix, claims to take communion every day and once told Raúl Alfonsín she had seen the Virgin Mary. She is against decriminalization of drug use and abortion. Carrió marked her firm stance against abortion before and after entering Congress, including during the time Cambiemos co-founder Mauricio Macri encouraged legislators of the alliance to maturely and responsibly debate an issue, as it divided both the opposition and the ruling party. She refrained from legalizing same-sex marriage and was neutral about it.

== Publications ==
- Vida (Life), 2019
- Yo amo la República (I love the Republic), 2015
- Humanismo y Libertad Tomo II (Humanism and Liberty Volume II), 2014
- Humanismo y Libertad Tomo I (Humanism and Liberty Volume I), 2013
- El futuro es hoy (The future is today), 2011
- La educación como política central del porvenir (Education as the central policy for the future), 2006
- La nueva matriz de saqueo (The new matrix of looting), 2006
- Búsquedas de sentido para una nueva política (Search for meaning for a new policy), 2005
- La concepción del poder desde las mujeres (The conception of women's power), 2005
- Hacia un nuevo contrato moral: discursos e intervenciones sobre la realidad nacional (Towards a new moral contract: discourse and interventions in national reality), 2004

== Electoral history ==
=== Executive ===
Electoral history of Elisa Carrió
Election	Office	List	Votes			Result	Ref.
Election	Office	List	Total	%	P.	Result	Ref.
2003	President of Argentina	ARI	2,723,207	14.05%	5th	Not elected	
2007	President of Argentina	Civic Coalition	5,168,481	27.05%	2nd	Not elected	
2011	President of Argentina	Civic Coalition ARI	399,685	1.82%	7th	Not elected	
2015 PASO	President of Argentina	Cambiemos	514,040	2.16%	5th	Not elected (Note: Lost in the coalition's internal election.)	

=== Legislative ===
Electoral history of Elisa Carrió
Election	Office	List	#	District	Votes			Result	Ref.
Election	Office	List	#	District	Total	%	P.	Result	Ref.
1995	National Deputy	Radical Civic Union	1	Chaco Province	122,238	31.59%	2nd (Note: Presented on an electoral list. The data shown represents the share of the vote the entire party/alliance received in that constituency.)	Elected	
1999	National Deputy	Front for All	1	Chaco Province	255,096	58.60%	1st	Elected	
2005	National Deputy	ARI	1	City of Buenos Aires	394,608	22.01%	2nd	Elected	
2009	National Deputy	Social and Civic Agreement	3	City of Buenos Aires	348,261	19.14%	3rd	Elected	
2013	National Deputy	Broad Front UNEN	1	City of Buenos Aires	589,545	32.21%	2nd	Elected	
2017	National Deputy	Cambiemos	1	City of Buenos Aires	982,867	50.98%	1st	Elected	

== See also ==
- List of political parties in Argentina
- Politics of Argentina
