= 2023 Tierra del Fuego provincial elections =

- Gubernatorial election
- 14 May 2023
- Registered: 147 064
- Turnout: 71.28% (▼2.6pp)
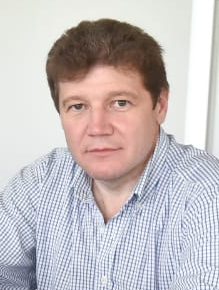

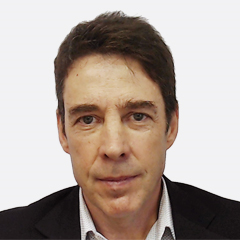

Nominee	Gustavo Melella	Héctor Stefani
Party	FORJA	PRO
Alliance	FdT
Running mate	Mónica Urquiza	Paulino Rossi
Popular vote	52,438	11,309
Percentage	65.37%	14.10%
Nominee	Andrea Almirón De Pauli	Pablo Blanco
Party	RU	UCR
Alliance		JxC
Running mate	Sebastián Galdeano	Federico Frigerio
Popular vote	7,656	5,759
Percentage	9.54%	7.18%
Governor before election
Gustavo Melella
FORJA–FdT
Elected Governor
Gustavo Melella
FORJA–FdT
- Legislature
- 14 May 2023
- All 15 seats in the Legislature of Tierra del Fuego
- Turnout: 70.84%
Party	Leader	Vote %	Seats	+/–
PJ	Sí Juan Carlos Pino	14.82	3	−1
FORJA	Federico Sciurano	14.76	3	−1
Somos Fueguinos	Raúl von der Thusen	11.42	3	New
MOPOF	Damián Alberto Löffler	9.17	2	0
Green Party	María Laura Colazo	8.47	2	−1
RU	Agustín Pedro Coto	7.96	2	New
This lists parties that won seats. See the complete results below.

Elections were held on 14 May 2023, as part of the 2023 Argentine provincial elections, in the Argentine province of Tierra del Fuego to elect the Governor and all 15 seats to the Legislature of Tierra del Fuego, both for a 4-year term. Incumbent Governor Gustavo Melella was re-elected in the first round of voting.

== Electoral System ==
=== Governor and Vice-Governor ===
The Governor and Vice-Governor are elected on a joint ticket using a two-round system. Should no candidate attain over 50% of the vote, a second round is held within 15 days following the first round between the candidates who received first and second place in the first round of voting, in terms of vote share.

=== Legislature ===
The Legislature is elected through party-list proportional representation in a province-wide constituency, with seats allocated using the D'Hondt method. There is an electoral threshold of 5% of all valid votes cast.

== Results ==
=== Governor and Vice-Governor ===
Candidate	Running mate	Party	Votes	%
Gustavo Melella	Mónica Urquiza	FORJA Concertation Party - Frente de Todos	52,438	65.37
Héctor Stefani	Paulino Rossi	Republican Proposal	11,309	14.10
Andrea Almirón De Pauli	Sebastián Galdeano	United Republicans	7,656	9.54
Pablo Blanco	Federico Frigerio	Radical Civic Union - Juntos por el Cambio	5,759	7.18
Lucía Zulma Fernández	María Luisa Meza	Workers Party - Workers' Left Front	3,056	3.81
Total			80,218	100.00
Valid votes			80,218	76.52
Invalid votes			2,528	2.41
Blank votes			22,083	21.07
Total votes			104,829	100.00
Registered voters/turnout			147,064	71.28

=== Legislature ===
Party	Votes	%	Seats	+/–
Justicialist Party	11,099	14.82	3	-1
FORJA Concertation Party	11,058	14.76	3	-1
Somos Fueginos	8,559	11.42	3	New
Fuegian People's Movement	6,872	9.17	2	0
Green Party	6,346	8.47	2	-1
United Republicans	5,965	7.96	2	New
Juntos por el Cambio	4,841	6.46	0	-2
Unity and Reconstruction	3,919	5.23	0	New
Fuegian Commitment	3,093	4.13	0	New
Patagonian Social Party	2,532	3.38	0	0
Republican Proposal	2,426	3.24	0	New
Collective of the Organized Revolutionary Regional Economy	2,321	3.10	0	New
Sun of May	1,709	2.28	0	New
Workers' Left Front	1,607	2.15	0	New
Popular Front	1,471	1.96	0	New
Federal Commitment	1,098	1.47	0	New
Total	74,916	100.00	15	–
Valid votes	74,916	71.91		
Invalid votes	3,884	3.73		
Blank votes	25,380	24.36		
Total votes	104,180	100.00		
Registered voters/turnout	147,064	70.84		
