= Mabel Caparrós =

Argentine politician (born 1956)

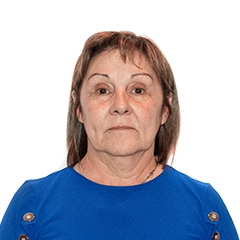

National Deputy
- In office 19 December 2019 – 10 December 2023
- Constituency: Tierra del Fuego

National Senator
- In office 10 December 2001 – 10 December 2007
- Constituency: Tierra del Fuego

Personal details
- Born: 9 January 1956 (age 70) Mar del Plata, Argentina
- Party: Justicialist Party (until 2019); FORJA Concertation Party (since 2019)
- Other political affiliations: Front for Victory (2003–2017); Frente de Todos (2019–present)
- Education: National University of Mar del Plata
- Profession: Psychologist, politician

Mabel Luisa Caparrós (born 9 January 1956) is an Argentine psychologist and politician. She previously served as a National Senator for Tierra del Fuego from 2001 to 2007 and later served as a National Deputy from 2019 to 2023. Formerly a member of the Justicialist Party, since 2019 she is a member of the FORJA Concertation Party.

== Early and personal life ==
Caparrós was born on 9 January 1956 in Mar del Plata, in Buenos Aires Province. She studied psychology at the National University of Mar del Plata, graduating in 1982. In 1985 she moved to Río Grande, in Tierra del Fuego, where she worked at the Department of Minors and Families of the provincial government, and later at the Mental Health Service of Río Grande Regional Hospital.

Caparrós is married to Roberto Eduardo Sánchez and has three children.

== Political career ==
A member of the Justicialist Party (PJ), in 1993 she was an alternate candidate to the Chamber of Deputies, and, in 1995, she was elected to the City Council of Río Grande. As a councillor, she presided the commissions on Legislation and Interpretation. She was re-elected for a second term in 1999, during which she presided the PJ bloc.

She ran for one of Tierra del Fuego's three seats in the Argentine Senate in the 2001 legislative election, as the second candidate in the PJ list, behind Mario Daniele. The list was the most voted, with 34.75% of the vote, and both Daniele and Caparrós were elected for the majority. She took office on 10 December 2001. Starting in 2003, she formed part of the Front for Victory bloc. In 2004, she authored Law 25.649, which mandates the use of generic names for drugs in medical prescriptions.

In 2005, she was elected president of the Tierra del Fuego chapter of the Justicialist Party. In 2007, following poor results in that year's local elections, she resigned from the position. Later that year, Daniele and Caparrós ran for re-election, but the Front for Victory list came third and neither of them were elected.

Caparrós was the vice governor candidate in the PJ ticket, alongside Adrián Fernández, in the 2011 provincial election. The Fernández-Caparrós ticket landed fourth in the election, with 6% of the vote. From 2011 to 2015, she was administrative secretary of the Tierra del Fuego Legislature, and from 2018 she served as legislative secretary of the Río Grande City Council.

=== National Deputy ===
As a member of the FORJA Concertation Party, Caparrós ran for one of the Tierra del Fuego seats in the Argentine Chamber of Deputies in the 2019 legislative election; she was the first candidate in the Vamos Todos a Vivir Mejor ("Let's All Live Better") list – an alliance formed by the Solidary Party, Popular Unity, New Encounter and FORJA – which supported the gubernatorial candidacy of Gustavo Melella. Although all the parties in the Vamos Todos a Vivir Mejor alliance supported the Frente de Todos coalition nationwide, they ran a separate list in Tierra del Fuego, as the Frente de Todos in the province supported the list headed by former governor Rosana Bertone. Vamos Todos a Vivir Mejor was the third-most voted list, with 20.53% of the vote, and Caparrós was elected.

As deputy, Caparrós formed part of the parliamentary commissions on Maritime Interests, Economy, Energy and Fuels, Industry, Natural Resources, Foreign Affairs, Tourism, and National Defense. She was a supporter of the 2020 Voluntary Interruption of Pregnancy bill, which legalized abortion in Argentina.
