= Osvaldo Ramón López =

Argentine politician (born 1971)

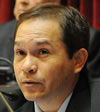

National Senator
- In office 27 July 2011 – 10 December 2013
- Constituency: Tierra del Fuego

Provincial Legislator of Tierra del Fuego
- In office 28 February 2009 – 27 July 2011

Personal details
- Born: 4 September 1971 (age 55) Malabrigo, Argentina
- Party: ARI (until 2009); New Encounter (since 2009)
- Other political affiliations: Front for Victory (2011–2017); Frente de Todos (since 2019)
- Spouse: Javier Calisaya (m. 2010)
- Education: National University of the Littoral

Osvaldo Ramón López (born 4 September 1971) is an Argentine lawyer and politician, who was a National Senator for Tierra del Fuego from 2011 to 2013. He took office in the Senate in replacement of José Carlos Martínez following Martínez's death in 2011. Upon being sworn in, López became the first openly gay member of the Argentine Congress.

López belongs to the New Encounter party, and formerly formed part of Affirmation for a Republic of Equals (ARI). He served as a member of the legislature of Tierra del Fuego from 2009 to 2011. As of 2021, he remains the only openly LGBT person to have served in the Argentine Senate.

== Early life and career ==
López was born on 4 September 1971 in Malabrigo, a rural community in the General Obligado Department of Santa Fe Province. His family worked as rural workers in the Southern Chaco region. He began his political activism as a student delegate in his hometown high school. In 1991, he moved to Santa Fe to study law at the National University of the Littoral (UNL), graduating in 1995. During his time as a university student, he was active in a political group linked to the Socialist Party.

In 1998, López moved to Tierra del Fuego, and worked in the Río Grande chapter of the Asociación de Trabajadores del Estado (ATE), the state workers' union.

== Political career ==
From 2003 to 2008, López served as a legislative aide in the Legislature of Tierra del Fuego for José Carlos Martínez, then a member of ARI. In 2007, López ran for a seat in the provincial legislature in the ARI list, but with 24.32% of the vote, the list did not receive enough votes for López to be elected. That same year, he was the first alternate candidate in the ARI list to the National Senate, behind Martínez and María Rosa Díaz, who were both elected.

In December 2008, ARI legislator Roberto Crocianelli resigned from his seat to be appointed minister of economy in the provincial government, and López took office in his place. In 2010, López left ARI and joined New Encounter, a new political coalition led by Martín Sabbatella.

On 7 July 2011, Martínez died in a car crash in Tolhuin, and as an alternate candidate, López was called on to replace him for the remainder of his 2007–2013 term. López was sworn in on 27 July 2011. Upon taking office, he became the first openly gay member of the Argentine Congress.

As senator, López proposed several bills aimed at granting further rights to LGBT people, such as a labour quota in the public sector for trans people (an initiative that would come to fruition in 2021) and reparative pension benefits for trans people. He additionally introduced bills to legalise and regulate prostitution, reformulate the maternity and paternity leaves system, and reduce working hours. He also continued Martínez's initiative to create a "Southern Maritime Corridor" to connect Tierra del Fuego island to the Argentine mainland.

López stood for re-election in 2013 as the first candidate in the Democratic Space for Victory list, separate from the Front for Victory. The list received 5.55% of the vote and placed fifth overall, far from the second place that would have granted López the seat for the minority. His term expired on 10 December 2013. López ran for governor of Tierra del Fuego in 2015, earning 5.79% of the vote and placing third overall. In 2019, he ran for a seat in the Argentine Chamber of Deputies as the second candidate in the Vamos Todos a Vivir Mejor ("Let's All Live Better") list, behind Mabel Caparrós. The list received 20.53% of the vote, enough for only Caparrós to be elected.

== Personal life ==
López is openly gay. Following the legalisation of same-sex marriage in Argentina in 2010, he married his long-term partner, Javier Calisaya, a trade union leader. It was the second gay marriage to be held in Tierra del Fuego.
