= Patagonian Social Party =

Argentine political party

Patagonian Social Party Partido Social Patagónico
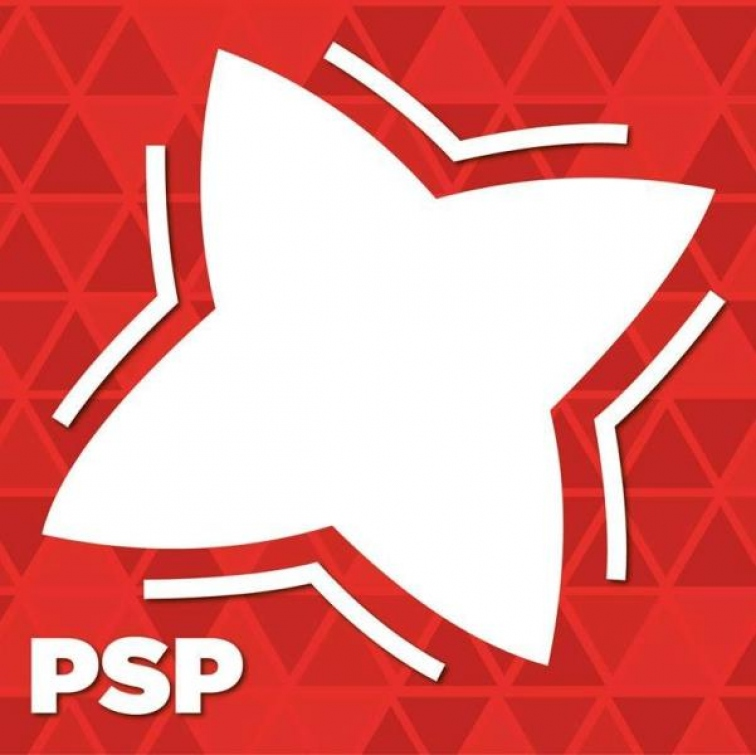
- Leader: Fabiana Ríos
- Headquarters: Ushuaia
- Membership (2017): ▼518
- Ideology: Progressivism
- Colors: Red
- Argentine Chamber of Deputies (Tierra del Fuego seats): 1 / 5
- Argentine Senate (Tierra del Fuego seats): 0 / 3
- Seats in the Tierra del Fuego Legislature: 0 / 15

Website
- Official website

The Patagonian Social Party (Spanish: Partido Social Patagónico; PSP) is a provincial political party in the Tierra del Fuego Province of Argentina. It was founded by then-governor Fabiana Ríos in 2010 as a splinter from ARI. Although Ríos was re-elected in 2011, the PSP has failed to gain much electoral success on its own since then. The party supported the successful 2019 gubernatorial candidacy of Gustavo Melella.

The party presently has representation in the Argentine Chamber of Deputies, as one of its members, Carolina Yutrovic, took office in the lower chamber in replacement of Martín Perez, who resigned to become intendente of Río Grande. Yutrovic was elected as deputy in her own right in 2021.

== Electoral results ==
=== Chamber of Deputies ===
| Election | Votes | % | seats won | total seats | position | presidency | notes |
|---|---|---|---|---|---|---|---|
| 2011 | 4,712 | 7.70 (#6th) | 0 | 0 / 3 | Extra-parliamentary | Cristina Fernández de Kirchner (Justicialist Party—FPV) | |
| 2013 | — | | 0 | 0 / 2 | Extra-parliamentary | Cristina Fernández de Kirchner (Justicialist Party—FPV) | did not participate |
| 2015 | 2,832 | 3.62 (#7th) | 0 | 0 / 3 | Extra-parliamentary | Mauricio Macri (PRO—Cambiemos) | |
| 2017 | 27,825 | 29.96 (#1st) | 0 (Note: Carolina Yutrovic, of the PSP, was second in the Civic and Social Front list and took office in replacement of Martín Pérez upon his resignation in 2019.) | 0 / 2 | Extra-parliamentary | Mauricio Macri (PRO—Cambiemos) | within Citizen's Unity |
| 2019 | 4,727 | 5.39 (#5th) | 0 | 0 / 3 | Extra-parliamentary | Alberto Fernández (PJ—FDT) | |
| 2021 | 37,692 | 39.65 (#1st) | 1 | 1 / 2 | Minority | Alberto Fernández (PJ—FDT) | within Frente de Todos |

=== Senate ===
| Election | Votes | % | seats won | total seats | position | presidency | notes |
|---|---|---|---|---|---|---|---|
| 2013 | — | | 0 | 0 / 3 | Extra-parliamentary | Cristina Fernández de Kirchner (Justicialist Party—FPV) | did not participate |
| 2019 | 4,826 | 5.30 (#5th) | 0 | 0 / 3 | Extra-parliamentary | Alberto Fernández (PJ—FDT) | |

=== Tierra del Fuego governorship ===
| Election | Candidate | Coalition | 1st round | | 2nd round | | Result |
| Election | Candidate | Coalition | Votes | % | Votes | % | Result |
|---|---|---|---|---|---|---|---|
| 2011 | Fabiana Ríos | — | 23,683 | 36.82 (2nd) | 36,201 | 50.66 (1st) | ✓ 2-R Elected |
| 2015 | Roberto Crocianelli | — | 4,251 | 5.48 (4th) | — | | ✗ Defeated |
| 2019 | Gustavo Melella | Concertación Fueguina | 50,329 | 55.03 (1st) | — | | ✓ 1-R Elected |

=== Tierra del Fuego provincial legislature ===
| Election | Votes | % | seats won | position |
|---|---|---|---|---|
| 2011 | 4,602 | 8.49 | 2 / 15 | Minority |
| 2015 | 3,511 | 5,18 | 0 / 15 | Extra-parliamentary |
| 2019 | 852 | 1.17 | 0 / 15 | Extra-parliamentary |
