= Carolina Yutrovic =

Argentine politician

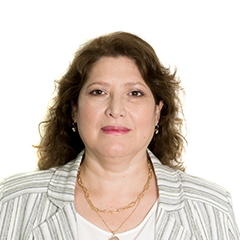

National Deputy
- Incumbent
- Assumed office 19 December 2019
- Constituency: Tierra del Fuego

Personal details
- Born: 12 September 1964 (age 61) Salta, Argentina
- Party: Patagonian Social Party
- Other political affiliations: Unidad Ciudadana (2017–2019); Frente de Todos (2019–present)

Inés Carolina Yutrovic (born 12 September 1964) is an Argentine politician, currently serving as National Deputy elected in Tierra del Fuego. A member of the localist Patagonian Social Party (PSP), Yutrovic first ran for a seat in 2017, but only took office upon the resignation of Martín Pérez in 2019. She currently sits in the Frente de Todos bloc.

== Early and personal life ==
Yutrovic was born on 12 September 1964 in Salta. She is married to Jorge Edmundo González Echazu and has four children.

== Political career ==
Yutrovic served in a number of positions in the provincial government of Tierra del Fuego during the administration of Fabiana Ríos, the founder and leader of the Patagonian Social Party. Yutrovic was an undersecretary at the Ministry of Labour from 2009 to 2011, and was appointed Minister of Labour in 2012. Later on, she was Minister of Industry and Productive Innovation from 2012 to 2015. Following the end of Ríos's governorship in 2015, Yutrovic was Undersecretary of Planning Administration and Public Investment in the municipal government of Ushuaia, from 2016 to 2019.

Yutrovic ran for one of the Tierra del Fuego seats in the Argentine Chamber of Deputies in the 2017 legislative election; she was the second candidate in the Civic and Social Front – a coalition of the PSP, the Victory Party, FORJA, the Humanist Party and New Encounter – behind Martín Pérez. The list was the most voted with 29.99% of the vote, but it was not enough for Yutrovic to make it past the D'Hondt cut.

In 2019, Pérez was elected intendente (mayor) of Río Grande; Yutrovic then took office in Pérez's stead for the remainder of the four-year term. She was sworn in on 19 December 2019. She became part of the newly established Frente de Todos bloc. Yutrovic became the first (and, to date, the only) member of the PSP to be elected to Congress. As deputy, she was a supporter of the 2020 Voluntary Interruption of Pregnancy bill, which legalized abortion in Argentina.

Ahead of the 2021 primary elections, Yutrovic was confirmed as the first candidate in the Frente de Todos list in Tierra del Fuego.
