= Analuz Carol =

Argentine politician (born 1984)

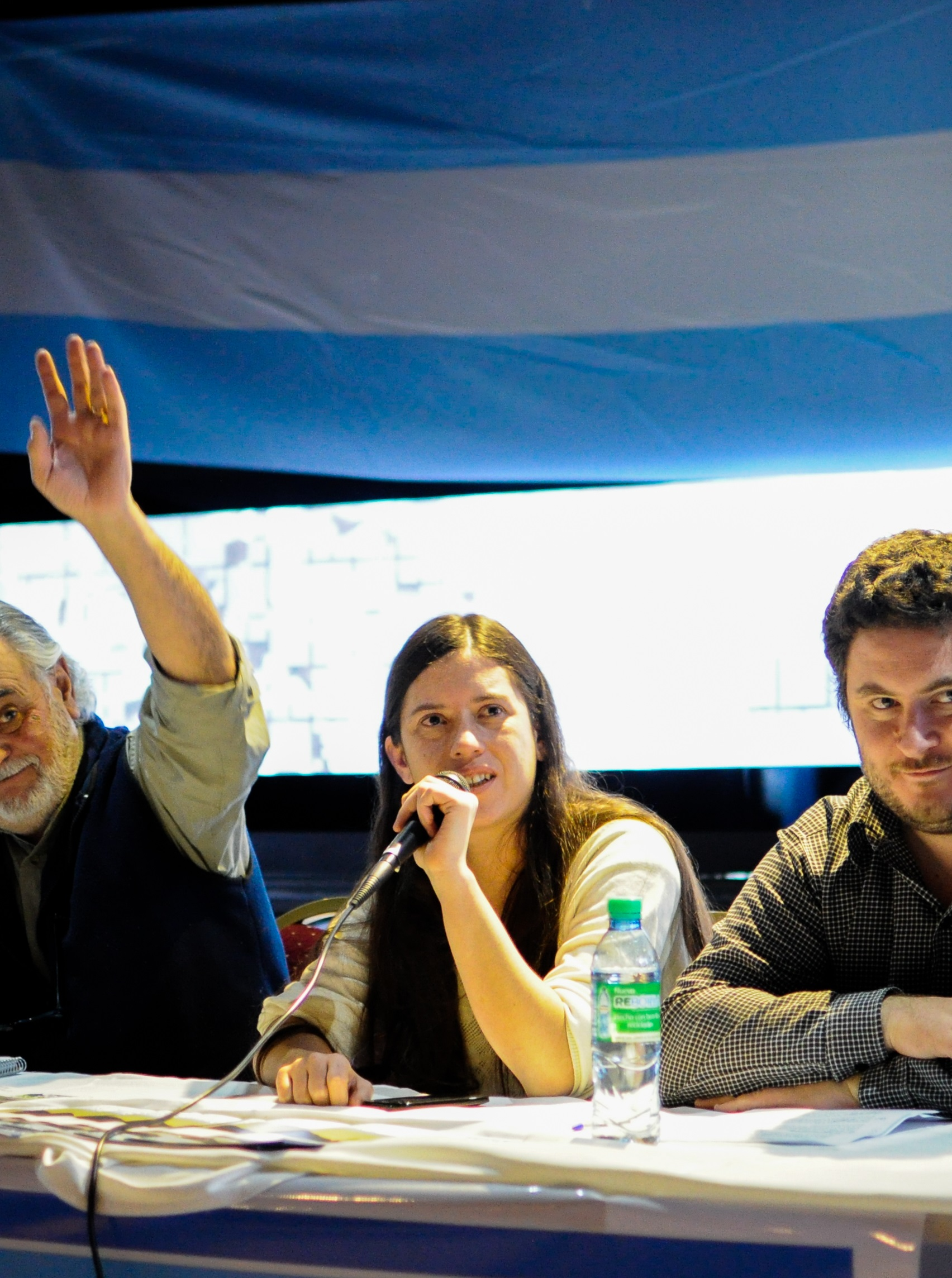

National Deputy
- In office 10 December 2015 – 10 December 2019
- Constituency: Tierra del Fuego

Personal details
- Born: 30 May 1984 (age 42) Bahía Blanca, Buenos Aires Province, Argentina
- Party: Justicialist Party
- Other political affiliations: Front for Victory (2015–2017); Citizen's Unity (2017–2019); Frente de Todos (since 2019)
- Spouse: Paula Cejas (m. 2016)
- Education: National Technological University

Analuz Ailén Carol (born 30 May 1984) is an Argentine fisheries engineer and politician who was a National Deputy elected in Tierra del Fuego from 2015 to 2019. She currently serves as Secretary of Science and Technology of Tierra del Fuego Province, in the administration of Governor Gustavo Melella.

== Early life and education ==
Analuz Ailén Carol was born on 30 May 1984 in Bahía Blanca, Buenos Aires Province. When she was two years old, her family moved to Tierra del Fuego. She studied fisheries engineering at the Río Grande Faculty of the National Technological University (UTN), being the first woman to earn that title from the UTN.

== Political career ==
Carol's political activism began in La Cámpora. She was the second candidate in the Front for Victory list to the Argentine Chamber of Deputies, under Matías David Rodríguez. The list received 42.01% of the vote and Carol was elected; she was sworn in on 4 December 2015.

As deputy, Carol voted in favor of the Voluntary Interruption of Pregnancy bill, which would have legalized abortion in Argentina, but was struck down by the Senate on 8 August 2018. In her intervention on the session to vote on the bill on 13 June 2018, Carol stated that "[abortion] is a human right". She also voted against the Mauricio Macri administration's pension reform in 2017.

Carol's term in the Chamber of Deputies expired on 10 December 2019, and she did not seek re-election. Upon the election of Gustavo Melella as governor of Tierra del Fuego, Carol was appointed in his government as Secretary of Science and Technology, taking office in 2019 under Minister of Education, Culture, Science and Technology Analía Cubino.

== Personal life ==
Carol married her partner, Paula Cejas, on 21 July 2016 – the sixth anniversary of the legalization of same-sex marriage in Argentina. Cejas was at the time a councilwoman in Tolhuin, also for the FPV. Carol was the first deputy, second congressperson and first congresswoman to marry under the 2010 Equal Marriage law, after Senator Osvaldo López, also from Tierra del Fuego.
