= Hugo Cóccaro =

Argentine politician (1954–2019)

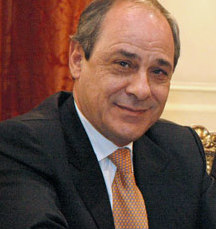

Governor of Tierra del Fuego
- In office 25 October 2005 – 10 December 2007
- Preceded by: Jorge Colazo
- Succeeded by: Fabiana Ríos

Personal details
- Born: 4 May 1954 Saladillo, Buenos Aires Province
- Died: 21 July 2019 (aged 65) Buenos Aires, Argentina
- Political party: Justicialist Party
- Profession: Sawmill proprietor

Hugo Omar Cóccaro (4 May 1954 – 21 July 2019) was an Argentine Justicialist Party (PJ) politician, who served as governor of Tierra del Fuego Province (formerly Tierra del Fuego, Antarctica, and South Atlantic Islands).

== Life ==
Born in Saladillo, Buenos Aires Province, Cóccaro relocated to Tierra del Fuego at age 20 with his brother, with whom he started a construction firm. He later purchased the San Justo Estancia, a lenga beech sawmill near Río Grande. He had four daughters, and his marriage ended in separation.

Cóccaro entered politics in 2003, when he was elected vice-governor under Governor Jorge Colazo of the Radical Civic Union (UCR). He fell out with Colazo, however, and there were public rows between them. He became acting governor of Tierra del Fuego on 25 October 2005, when Colazo was suspended, and was confirmed in the post on 2 December.

His tenure was marked by its failed support for RENASA, a provincial petroleum concern, and a subsequent impeachment. Cóccaro was not removed in his impeachment. Cóccaro ran for re-election in 2007, and won the first round, but was defeated in the runoff by Fabiana Ríos, the first woman to be elected governor in the history of Argentina.

Cóccaro died of cancer on 21 July 2019 in Buenos Aires at the age of 65.

Preceded by Jorge Colazo	Governor of Tierra del Fuego; 2005–2007	Succeeded by Fabiana Ríos
