= 2015 Argentine provincial elections =

Election of Argentine Governors, 2015
← 2013	2015	2017 →

21 of the 23 Provinces of Argentina and the Autonomous City of Buenos Aires
	First party	Second party	Third party
Party	PJ	UCR-PRO	PJ
Alliance	Front for Victory	Cambiemos	Federal Peronism
Seats before	15	2	3
Seats won	12	5	4
Seat change	-3	+3	+1
	Fourth party	Fifth party	Sixth party
Party	PJ	PS	[[Others|Others]]
Alliance	Renewal Front	Progresistas	[[Others|Others]]
Seats before	0	1	1
Seats won	1	1	1
Seat change	+1	0	0
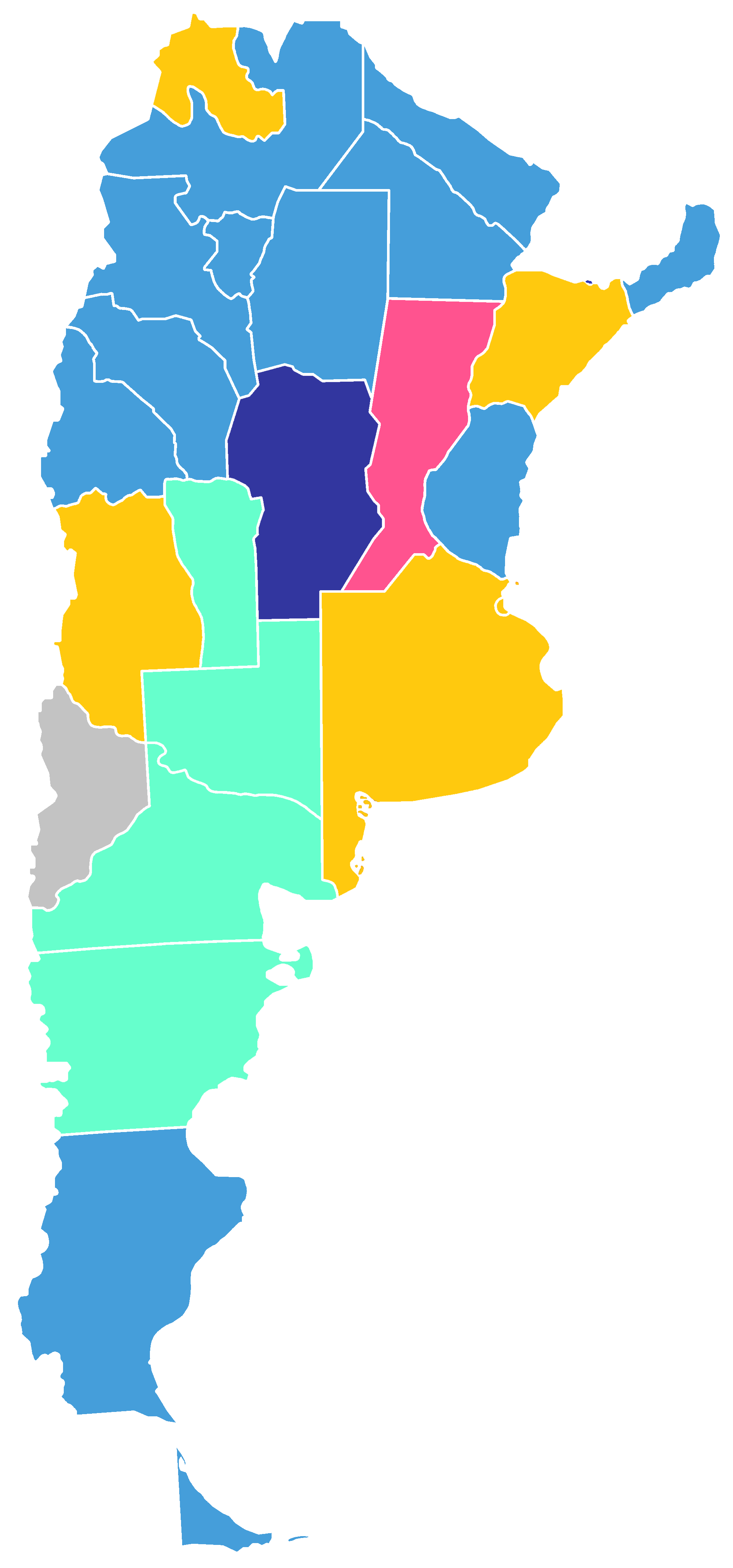

On the 25 October elections numerous provinces also elected governors, with the new ones beginning their terms on 10 December 2015. These provinces were Buenos Aires province, Catamarca, Chubut, Entre Ríos, Formosa, Jujuy, La Pampa, Misiones, San Juan, San Luis and Santa Cruz, encompassing 11 of the country's 23 provinces. The other provinces elected governors in different days of 2015; the only exceptions were Corrientes and Santiago del Estero whose governors' terms were not due to finish in 2015.

María Eugenia Vidal was elected governor of the populous Buenos Aires Province, defeating the controversial Aníbal Fernández; her victory influenced as well the growth of Macri in the presidential elections. Similarly, the unpopular Fernández may have subtracted non-Kirchnerite votes from Scioli. The victory was considered significant given that Fernández is the incumbent Cabinet Chief of the Kirchner administration, and that Vidal is directly replacing Daniel Scioli's current post as governor of the province. It is made more significant as she is the first female governor of the province, and the first non-Peronist governor since 1987. The Republican Proposal also retained the city of Buenos Aires, that elected Horacio Rodríguez Larreta as the new mayor. The PRO stronghold had gone to a second round between Larreta and Martín Lousteau (also of the Cambiemos front, but not in the same party) after the Front for Victory's Mariano Recalde finished third. Juan Schiaretti won the elections in Córdoba, and he is the single governor of the UNA ticket. The socialist Miguel Lifschitz was elected governor of Santa Fe, after a controversial triple tie with the PJ and PRO. Carlos Verna was reelected governor of La Pampa.

The votes in Entre Ríos had a slow count. During a week, the provisional results suggested that Gustavo Bordet may be the new governor of Entre Ríos, but Alfredo de Angeli claimed that the uncounted votes may turn the tide and make him the winner instead. The final results were released on October 30, confirming the victory of Bordet. Hugo Passalacqua, vice governor of Maurice Closs was elected governor by a wide margin.

Rosana Bertone was elected governor of Tierra del Fuego. The radical Eduardo Costa got the higher number of votes in Santa Cruz, but Alicia Kirchner was elected governor, thanks to the Ley de Lemas. The former governor of Chubut Mario Das Neves was elected again. Neuquén and Río Negro elected Omar Gutiérrez and Alberto Weretilneck, who ran for local parties.

Mendoza provided an early victory for the opposition, by the radical Alfredo Cornejo. Alberto Rodríguez Saá was elected governor of San Luis once again. The Front for Victory retained the provinces of San Juan and La Rioja, with Sergio Uñac and Sergio Casas.

Lucía Corpacci was reelected in Catamarca. Juan Manuel Urtubey got an important victory in Salta against Romero, and kept the province for the FPV. The radical Gerardo Morales was elected governor of Jujuy, the first non-Peronist one since the return of democracy in 1983. He expects to have a tense relation with the populist Milagro Sala. Juan Luis Manzur was elected governor of Tucumán, but the denounces of electoral fraud became a national scandal. The elections were first declared null by local judge, and then ratified by the local Supreme Court. The case is currently held by the national Supreme Court.

Province	Affiliation (Party)	Governor	Vice Governor	Date held
City of Buenos Aires (in detail)	Cambiemos (PRO)	Horacio Rodríguez Larreta	Diego Santilli	5 July; 25 July (runoff)
Buenos Aires Province	Cambiemos (PRO)	María Eugenia Vidal	Daniel Salvador	25 October
(Catamarca Province); Catamarca	Front for Victory	Lucía Corpacci	Octavio Gutiérrez	25 October
(Chaco Province); Chaco	Front for Victory	Domingo Peppo	Daniel Capitanich	20 September
(Chubut Province); Chubut	Federal Peronism (We Are All Chubut)	Mario Das Neves	Mariano Arcioni	25 October
(Córdoba Province, Argentina); Córdoba	Frente Renovador (Union for Córdoba)	Juan Schiaretti	Martín Llaryora	5 July
(Entre Ríos Province); Entre Ríos	Front for Victory	Gustavo Bordet	Adán Bahl	25 October
(Formosa Province); Formosa	Front for Victory	Gildo Insfrán	Floro Bogado	25 October
(Jujuy Province); Jujuy	Cambiemos (UCR)	Gerardo Morales	Carlos Haquim	25 October
(La Pampa Province); La Pampa	Federal Peronism (PJ)	Carlos Verna	Mariano Fernández	25 October
(La Rioja Province, Argentina); La Rioja	Front for Victory	Sergio Casas	Néstor Bosetti	5 July
(Mendoza Province); Mendoza	Cambiemos (UCR)	Alfredo Cornejo	Laura Montero	21 June
(Misiones Province); Misiones	Front for Victory (Front for the Renewal of Concord)	Hugo Passalacqua	Oscar Herrera Ahuad	25 October
(Neuquén Province); Neuquén	Movimiento Popular Neuquino	Omar Gutiérrez	Rolando Figueroa	26 April
(Río Negro Province); Río Negro	Federal Peronism (Together We Are Río Negro)	Alberto Weretilneck	Pedro Pesatti	14 June
(Salta Province); Salta	Front for Victory	Juan Manuel Urtubey	Miguel Isa	17 May
(San Juan Province, Argentina); San Juan	Front for Victory	Sergio Uñac	Marcelo Lima	25 October
(San Luis Province); San Luis	Federal Peronism (PJ)	Alberto Rodríguez Saá	Carlos Ponce	25 October
(Santa Cruz Province, Argentina); Santa Cruz	Front for Victory	Alicia Kirchner	Pablo González	25 October
(Santa Fe Province); Santa Fe	Progressives (Partido Socialista)	Miguel Lifschitz	Carlos Fascendini	17 June
(Tierra del Fuego Province, Argentina); Tierra del Fuego	Front for Victory	Rosana Bertone	Juan Carlos Arcando	21 June; 28 June (runoff)
(Tucumán Province); Tucumán	Front for Victory	Juan Luis Manzur (Note: José Cano (UCR) denounced electoral fraud that may have benefited Manzur. The Supreme Court of Tucumán ratified the elections, but the case is still going on at the Supreme Court of Argentina)	Osvaldo Jaldo	23 August

== See also ==
- List of current provincial governors in Argentina
