= Mónica Urquiza =

Argentine politician

Vice Governor of Tierra del Fuego
- Incumbent
- Assumed office 17 December 2019
- Governor: Gustavo Melella
- Preceded by: Juan Carlos Arcando

Provincial Legislator of Tierra del Fuego
- In office 10 December 2015 – 10 December 2019
- In office 10 December 2007 – 10 December 2011

Personal details
- Born: 5 May 1965 (age 60) Concepción del Uruguay, Argentina
- Party: Fueguian People's Movement

Mónica Susana Urquiza (born 5 May 1965) is an Argentine politician who has been Vice Governor of Tierra del Fuego Province since 2019, under Governor Gustavo Melella. She previously served as a member of the provincial legislature for two non-consecutive terms. Urquiza belongs to the Fueguian People's Movement (MOPOF).

== Early life ==
Urquiza was born on 5 May 1965 in Concepción del Uruguay, Entre Ríos Province, to Justo José Urquiza and Estela. She moved to Ushuaia, Tierra del Fuego, in 1983. In addition to politics, she has also worked as a public auctioneer.

== Career ==
Urquiza was Secretary of Finances of the provincial government of Tierra del Fuego from 1998 to 2000, during the second governorship of José Arturo Estabillo. She later went on to have a similar position at the municipal government of Ushuaia, then led by intendente Jorge Alberto Garramuño, from 2003 to 2007. In 2007, she was elected to the provincial legislature on the Fueguian People's Movement (MOPOF) list for a four year-term, until 2011. She later served in the legislature again from 2015 to 2019.

In the 2019 provincial elections, she was the running mate of Gustavo Melella (of the FORJA Party) in the "Vamos Todos a Vivir Mejor" ticket to the governorship of Tierra del Fuego. The ticket won over 50% of the vote. Upon taking office on 17 December 2019, she became the first female vice governor of Tierra del Fuego (despite the province having already elected two women to the governorship before). As vice governor, Urquiza is the constitutionally-recognised president of the provincial legislature.

Political offices
| Preceded by Juan Carlos Arcando | Vice Governor of Tierra del Fuego; 2019–present | Incumbent |
