= Jorge Colazo =

Argentine Radical Civic Union politician

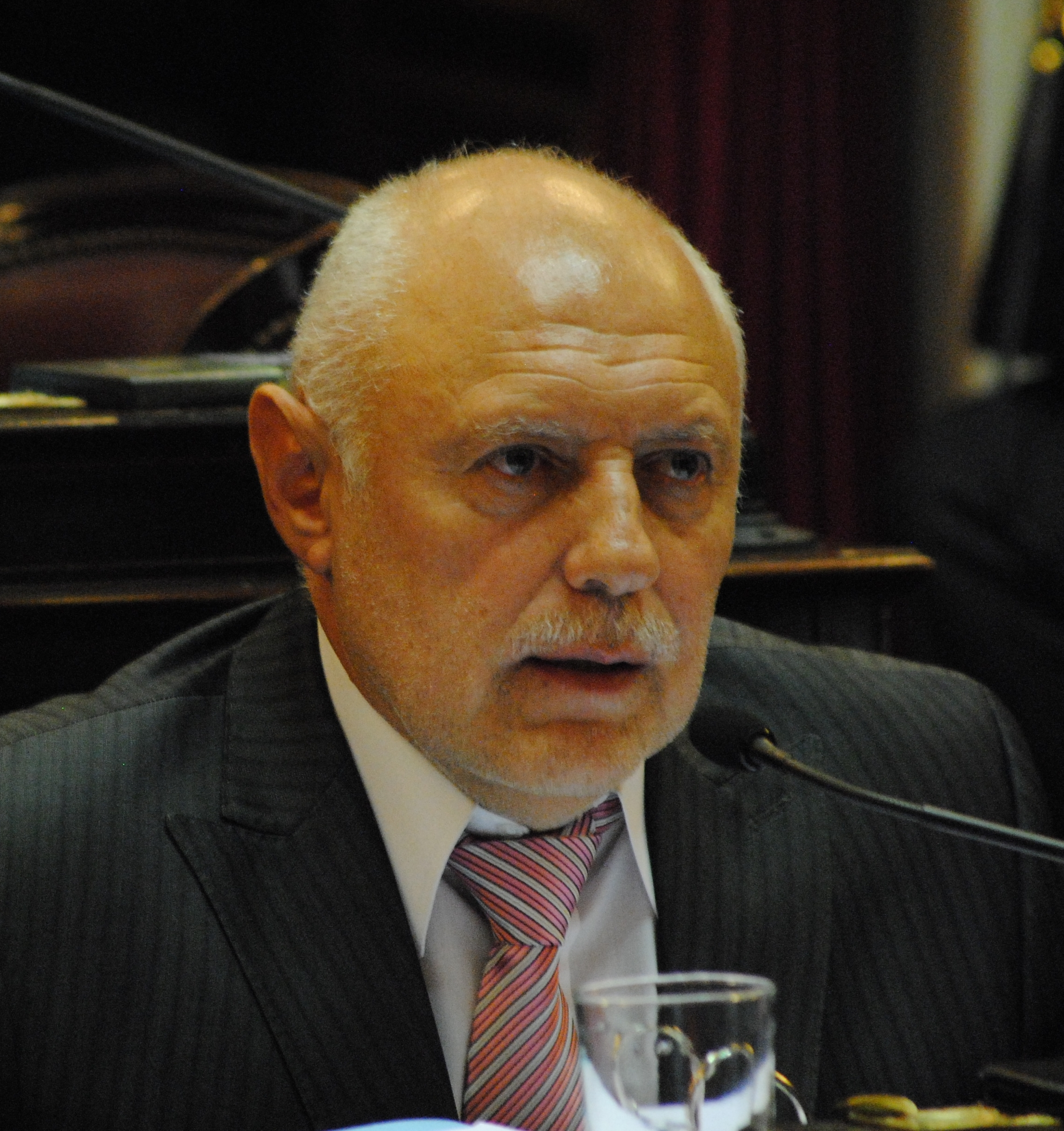
- Mario Jorge Colazo

National Senator
- In office 10 December 2007 – 10 December 2013
- Constituency: Tierra del Fuego
- In office 10 December 2001 – 10 January 2004
- Constituency: Tierra del Fuego

Governor of Tierra del Fuego
- In office 10 January 2004 – 2 December 2005
- Preceded by: Carlos Manfredotti
- Succeeded by: Hugo Cóccaro

Mayor of Río Grande
- In office 1991–1999

Personal details
- Born: March 4, 1954 (age 72) Río Tercero, Argentina
- Party: Radical Civic Union
- Spouse: Ana María del Carmen Córdoba

Mario Jorge Colazo, "El Potro", (born 4 March 1954) is an Argentine Radical Civic Union (UCR) politician. He was governor of Tierra del Fuego from 2004 to 2005, when he was removed from office by the Supreme Court. From 2001 to 2004, and again from 2007 to 2013, he sat in the Argentine Senate.

== Early life and career ==
Colazo was born on 4 March 1954 in Río Tercero, Córdoba Province. He attended primary school in Córdoba before moving to Río Grande, Tierra del Fuego for his secondary education. He was involved in various community organisations. During the Falklands War he served in civil protection in Río Grande.

From an early age, Colazo was involved in the UCR and held senior positions in the party at provincial and national levels. From 1989 to 1991 he served as a Río Grande councillor and in 1991 he was elected Mayor of Río Grande, serving until 1999. In that year he stood as candidate for governor of the Province. From January 2000 he worked as head of the Social Services for Pensioners for the Province until 2001.

== Political career ==
In 2001 Colazo was elected as senator. Then in 2003 he was elected as governor of the province, defeating incumbent Peronist Carlos Manfredotti and taking office in January 2004 with Hugo Cóccaro as his vice-governor. Although a Radical, he was by now identified with the attempt at political consensus of the new President, Peronist Néstor Kirchner, and was seen as one of the leading 'Radicales K'. Indeed, Cóccaro was a Justicialist, although he had been a supporter of the anti-Kirchner Peronist leader Adolfo Rodríguez Saá against Kirchner for the Presidency.

The relationship between Colazo and Cóccaro soon deteriorated, to the extent that Colazo even accused his deputy of involvement in plans to assassinate him. Colazo had also been isolated from his party, who had suspended him for his links with the Peronists. He was put under investigation by the provincial legislature for misuse of municipal funds in Río Grande and for bypassing the legislature when making budget decisions in 2004, and in September 2005 he was suspended as governor. He was impeached in December 2005 and Cóccaro formally took over.

In 2007, Colazo stood for and was re-elected to the Senate, heading the Federalist Union list. He sits with the Kirchners' Front for Victory. However, in March 2008, a Tierra del Fuego court requested that the Senate expel him in connection with the ongoing allegations relating to improper use of funds while Mayor of Río Grande. This would allow Colazo to be prosecuted.
