= Leonardo Grosso =

Argentine politician and political scientist

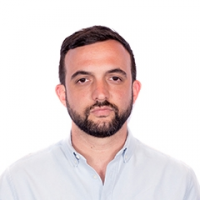

National Deputy
- In office 4 December 2011 – 10 December 2023
- Constituency: Buenos Aires

Personal details
- Born: 1 April 1983 (age 43) San Martín, Buenos Aires Province, Argentina
- Party: Evita Movement (2005–present)
- Other political affiliations: Front for Victory (2011–2017); Frente de Todos (2019–present)
- Spouse: Guillermo Castro (m. 2019)

Leonardo Grosso (born 1 April 1983) is an Argentine politician. Grosso is a member and one of the most prominent faces of the Evita Movement, a peronist political and social organization. He was a member of the Argentine Chamber of Deputies for Buenos Aires Province for 12 years, from 2011 to 2023.

== Early life and education ==
Grosso was born on 1 April 1983 in San Martín, a city in the Greater Buenos Aires conurbation. He started his political activism in the JP Evita, the Evita Movement's youth wing, in 2005. He is currently studying political science at the National University of General San Martín (UNSAM).

== Political career ==
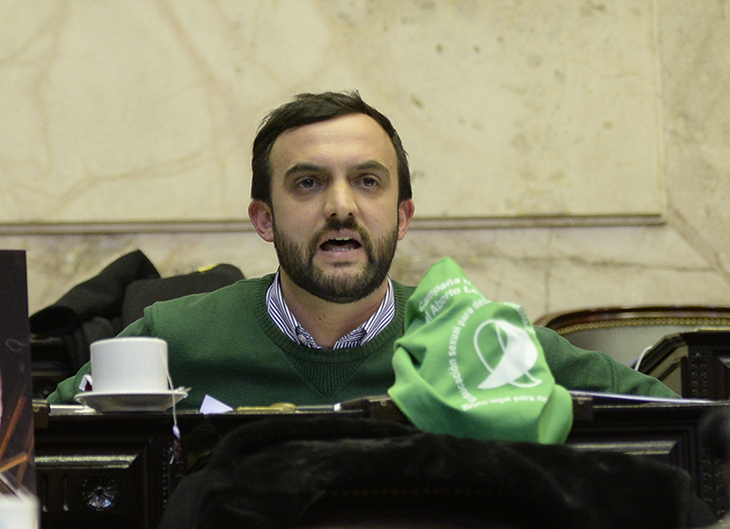
Grosso in 2018, during the first debate on the Voluntary Interruption of Pregnancy Bill

Grosso was first elected to the Chamber of Deputies in 2011 in the Front for Victory list in Buenos Aires Province, in which he was the 20th candidate. He was elected and sat in the Front for Victory bloc, aligned with the government of then-president Cristina Fernández de Kirchner. He was re-elected in 2015, this time placing 13th in the FPV list.

Ahead of the 2017 legislative election, Grosso and the rest of the Evita Movement broke ranks with the FPV and instead backed the unsuccessful senatorial candidacy of former Interior Minister Florencio Randazzo; in the Chamber of Deputies, the Evita Movement formed the Peronism for Victory bloc, which later formed part of the Red por Argentina parliamentary group alongside, among others, deputies Felipe Solá and Victoria Donda.

Ahead of the 2019 general election, the Evita Movement joined the Frente de Todos (FDT) to back the presidential candidacy of Alberto Fernández; Grosso was 3rd in the FDT deputies list in Buenos Aires Province and was easily re-elected.

In 2023, he announced his intention to run for the mayorship of General San Martín Partido.

== Personal life ==
In 2019 Grosso married his long-term partner, Guillermo Castro, becoming one of the few members of the Argentine National Congress to marry a same-sex partner under the 2010 same-sex marriage law, after Analuz Carol and Osvaldo López. Grosso has stated that he identifies as marica.

Grosso is a vocal supporter of the legalization of abortion in Argentina, and voted in favor of the Voluntary Interruption of Pregnancy Bill during its treatment by the Chamber of Deputies in 2018 and 2020.

== Electoral history ==
=== Legislative ===
Electoral history of Leonardo Grosso
Election	Office	List	#	District	Votes			Result	Ref.
Election	Office	List	#	District	Total	%	P.	Result	Ref.
2011	National Deputy	Front for Victory	20	Buenos Aires Province	4,592,054	57.10%	1st (Note: Presented on an electoral list. The data shown represents the share of the vote the entire party/alliance received in that constituency.)	Elected	
2015	National Deputy	Front for Victory	13	Buenos Aires Province	3,354,619	37.28%	1st	Elected	
2019	National Deputy	Frente de Todos	3	Buenos Aires Province	5,113,359	52.64%	1st	Elected	
2021	Councillor	Frente de Todos	2	General San Martín Partido	96,394	39.47%	1st	Elected (Note: Never took office.)	
