= Matías David Rodríguez =

Argentine politician (1981–2023)

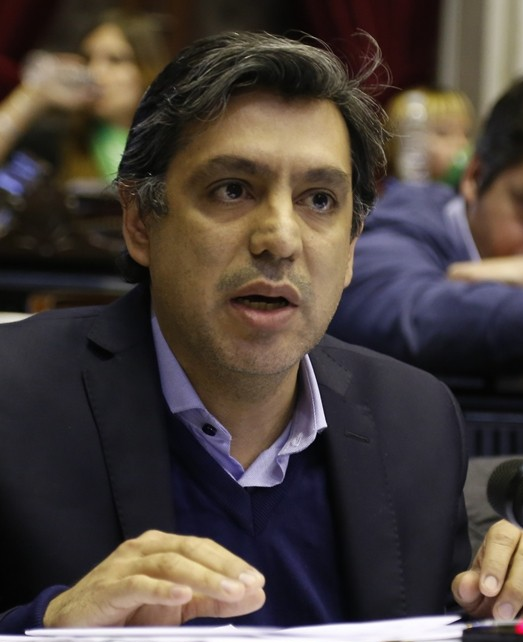
- Rodríguez in 2018

National Senator
- In office 10 December 2019 – 18 October 2023
- Constituency: Tierra del Fuego

National Deputy
- In office 10 December 2015 – 10 December 2019
- Constituency: Tierra del Fuego

Personal details
- Born: 14 December 1981 Ushuaia, Tierra del Fuego, Argentina
- Died: 18 October 2023 (aged 41) Ushuaia, Tierra del Fuego, Argentina
- Party: Justicialist Party
- Other political affiliations: Front for Victory (2015–2017); Citizen's Unity (2017–2019); Frente de Todos (2019-2023)
- Children: 2

Matías David Rodríguez (14 December 1981 – 18 October 2023) was an Argentine politician who served as a National Senator for Tierra del Fuego. A member of the Justicialist Party and La Cámpora, Rodríguez was elected in 2019, and sat in the Frente de Todos parliamentary bloc.

Rodríguez previously served as a National Deputy from 2015 to 2019, and as head of the provincial branch of ANSES in Tierra del Fuego from 2012 to 2015.

== Early and personal life ==
Matías David Rodríguez was born in Ushuaia, Tierra del Fuego on 14 December 1981. He was married to Laura Beatriz Ávila and had two children.

== Political career ==
Rodríguez became a supporter of former president Néstor Kirchner during his presidential campaign in 2003, when he became part of the "Kirchner Presidente" committee in Tierra del Fuego. Later, in 2007, Rodríguez was one of the founders of La Cámpora in the province.

In 2012, Rodríguez was appointed chief of the Tierra del Fuego branch of ANSES, Argentina's national social security agency. Two years later, in the 2015 legislative election, he ran for a seat in the National Chamber of Deputies as the first candidate in the Front for Victory list. The list received 42.01% of the vote, and Rodríguez was comfortably elected alongside the next candidate in the list, Analuz Carol. They were sworn in on 4 December 2015.

As a national deputy, Rodríguez served as secretary on the parliamentary commission on small and medium-sized businesses (PyMES), and formed part of the commissions on commerce, finances, industry, and tourism.

In the 2019 legislative election, Rodríguez ran for one of Tierra del Fuego's three seats in the Argentine Senate as the first candidate in the Frente de Todos (FDT) list, followed by María Eugenia Duré. With 41.1% of the vote, the FDT was the most-voted list in Tierra del Fuego, and both Rodríguez and Duré were elected for the majority seats. As senator, he formed part of the commissions on accords, administrative and municipal affairs, national defense, and national economy and investment.

Rodríguez was a supporter of the legalisation of abortion in Argentina, voting in favour of the Voluntary Interruption of Pregnancy Bill in 2018 as deputy and in 2020 as senator.

== Death ==
On 18 October 2023, Rodríguez was found dead inside his home in Ushuaia. It was reported that his body had sustained a gunshot wound. The initial investigation concluded that his death was a suicide as Rodriguez had left behind a note that stated he had found his wife in bed with his friend, the current intendant of Ushuaia, Walter Vuoto, and that they had confessed to him they had been lovers for some time.
