= Rosana Bertone =

Argentine politician

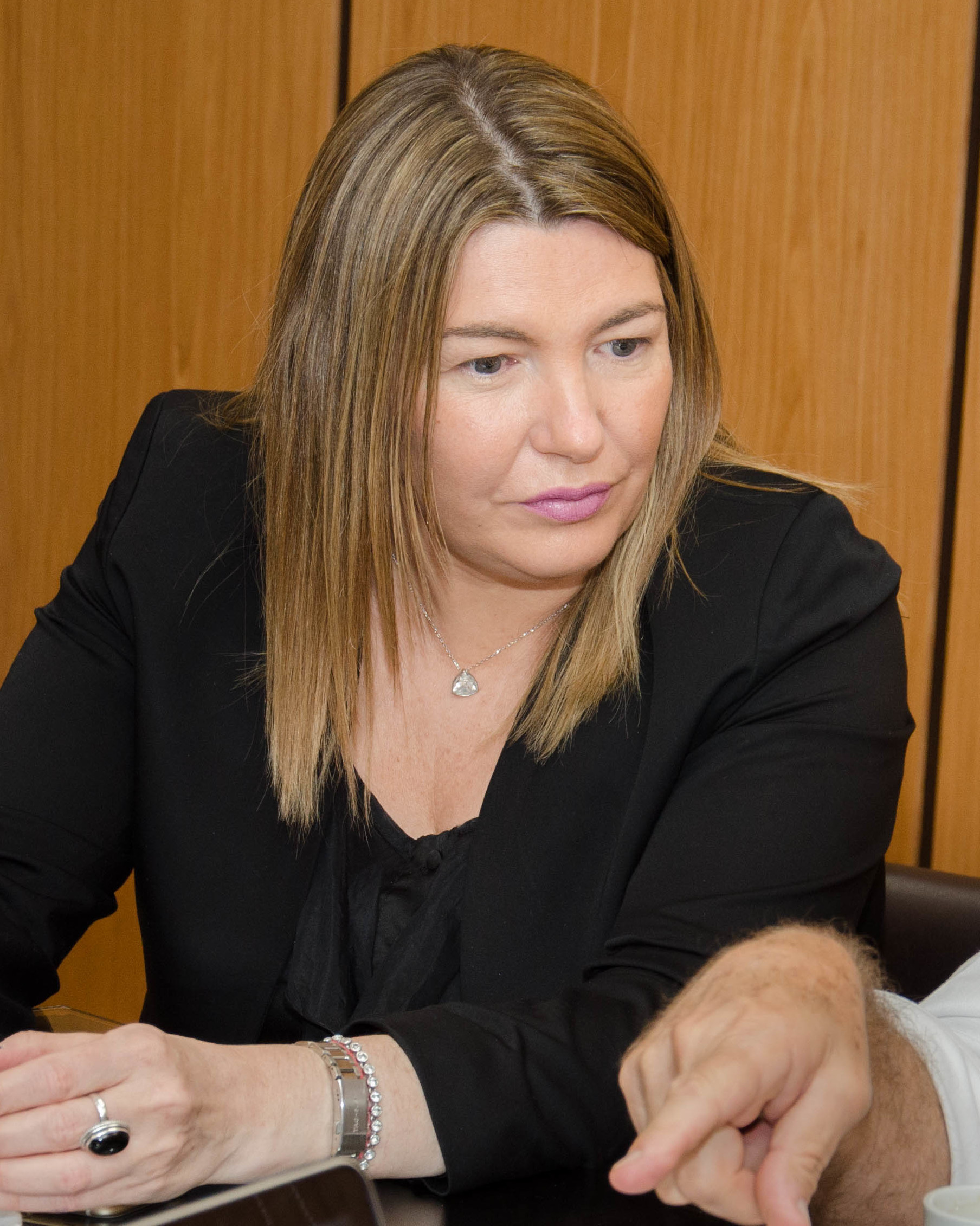
- Rosana Bertone in 2016

National Deputy
- In office 10 December 2019 – 10 December 2023
- Constituency: Tierra del Fuego
- In office 10 December 2001 – 10 December 2013
- Constituency: Tierra del Fuego

Governor of Tierra del Fuego, Antarctica and Southern Atlantic Islands
- In office 10 December 2015 – 10 December 2019
- Vice Governor: Juan Carlos Arcando
- Preceded by: Fabiana Ríos
- Succeeded by: Juan Carlos Arcando

National Senator
- In office 10 December 2013 – 10 December 2015
- Constituency: Tierra del Fuego

Personal details
- Born: 9 May 1972 (age 54) San Salvador, Entre Ríos
- Party: Justicialist Party
- Other political affiliations: Frente de Todos (2019–2023); Front for Victory (2003–2019)
- Education: National University of the Littoral
- Profession: Lawyer

Rosana Andrea Bertone (born 9 May 1972, in San Salvador, Entre Ríos) is an Argentine politician and the former Governor of Tierra del Fuego Province, serving from 2015 to 2019.

Bertone served as a National Deputy from 2001 to 2013 and again from 2015 to 2019. She also served as a National Senator from 2013 to 2015.

== Political career ==
Bertone qualified as a lawyer in 1995 from the Faculty of Law and Social Sciences of the National University of the Littoral. In 2001 she was elected to the Argentine Chamber of Deputies for Tierra del Fuego and was re-elected in 2005 and 2009. In 2010 she caused controversy when she opposed her party's plans to introduce same-sex marriage.

Bertone ran for Governor of Tierra del Fuego in the 2011 election but lost in the run-off vote to incumbent Governor Fabiana Ríos. Following the completion of her third term as a Deputy in 2013, Bertone was elected to the Argentine Senate for Tierra del Fuego. In 2015 she ran again for Governor, gaining 42.26% of the vote in the first round on June 21. On June 28 she defeated her opponent, Federico Sciurano, with over 50% of the vote to be elected Governor.

In 2017, Bertone condemned the Falkland Islands general election as an 'illegitimate legislative electoral act' and stated that the only 'legitimate' legislators for the islands were those elected in 2015 to the Legislature of Tierra del Fuego province, under whose jurisdiction the Falklands fall according to Argentina's sovereignty claim to the Islands.

Bertone sought re-election as governor in 2019, but lost in the first round to the FORJA candidate, Gustavo Melella. Bertone left office in December 2019 at the end of her term.
