= Federico Frigerio =

Argentine politician

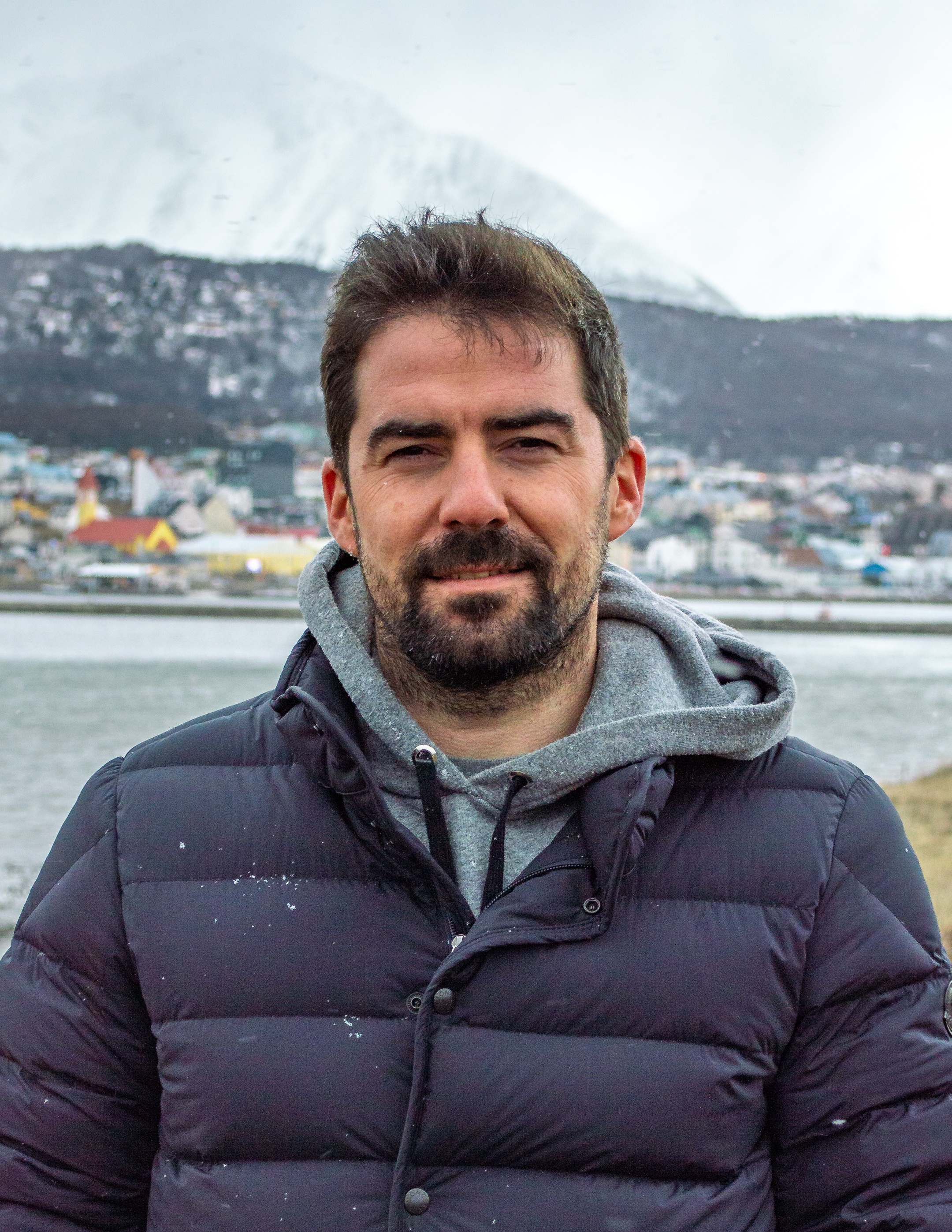

National Deputy
- Incumbent
- Assumed office 10 December 2019
- Constituency: Tierra del Fuego

Personal details
- Born: 4 May 1987 (age 38) Buenos Aires, Argentina
- Party: Integration and Development Movement
- Other political affiliations: Juntos por el Cambio (2015–present)

Federico Frigerio (born May 4 1987) is an Argentine politician, currently serving as National Deputy elected in Tierra del Fuego. A member of the Integration and Development Movement (MID), he currently forms part of the Republican Proposal parliamentary bloc in the Chamber of Deputies.

== Early and personal life ==
Frigerio was born on 5 April 1987 in Buenos Aires, son of Mario Enrique Frigerio (1949–2020) and grandson of Rogelio Julio Frigerio (1914–2006), who founded the Integration and Development Movement (MID). Frigerio's cousins include former Interior Minister Rogelio Frigerio.

He enrolled to study law at the Pontifical Catholic University of Argentina, but dropped out before finishing his degree. In 2011, he moved to Río Grande, Tierra del Fuego, to establish his own company. He is a delegate of the Argentine Industrial Union.

== Political career ==
Frigerio is a member of the Integration and Development Movement, and served as president of the MID Youth. In alliance with Republican Proposal, Frigerio ran for one of the Tierra del Fuego seats in the Argentine Chamber of Deputies in the 2019 legislative election; he was the first candidate in the Juntos por el Cambio list. Juntos por el Cambio was the second-most voted list, with 23.68% of the vote, and Frigerio was elected.

As deputy, Frigerio formed part of the parliamentary commissions on Tourism, Natural Resources, Women and Diversity, Maritime Interests, Industry, National Defense, and Small and Medium-sized Companies. He was a supporter of the 2020 Voluntary Interruption of Pregnancy bill, which legalized abortion in Argentina.
