= Juan Carlos Arcando =

Argentine politician

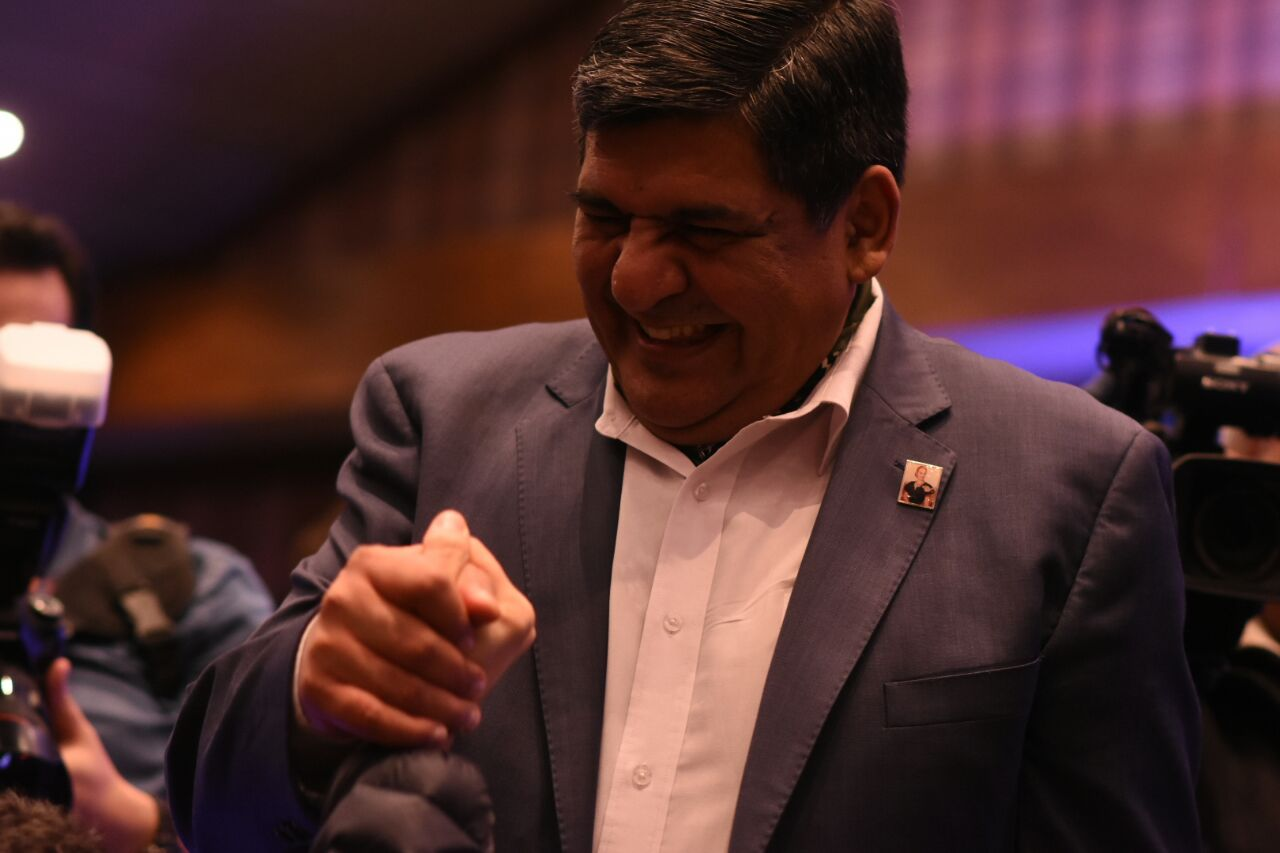

Governor of Tierra del Fuego
- In office 10 December 2019 – 17 December 2019
- Vice Governor: Vacant
- Preceded by: Rosana Bertone
- Succeeded by: Gustavo Melella

Vice Governor of Tierra del Fuego
- In office 17 December 2015 – 10 December 2019
- Governor: Rosana Bertone
- Preceded by: Roberto Crocianelli
- Succeeded by: Mónica Urquiza

Personal details
- Born: 18 July 1961 (age 64) Río Tercero, Argentina
- Party: Justicialist Party

Juan Carlos Arcando (born 18 July 1961) is an Argentine politician and retired navy officer. He served as Vice Governor of Tierra del Fuego Province from 2015 to 2019, under Governor Rosana Bertone. In 2019, following Bertone's election to Congress, Arcando served as Governor for a week from 10 December to 17 December 2019. He belongs to the Justicialist Party.

Arcando was born in Río Tercero, Córdoba Province. He served in the Argentine Navy from 1977 to 1986, and was involved in logistical operations during the Falklands War. He served as a town councillor and as a member of the Provincial Legislature before being elected Vice Governor alongside Bertone in the 2015 provincial election.

In the 2019 general election, Bertone was elected to the National Chamber of Deputies. She took office on 10 December 2019, seven days before her successor to the governorship, Governor-elect Gustavo Melella, was due to be sworn in. Arcando then took office as governor to complete Bertone's four-year term for seven days.

During his seven-day term, Arcando caused a number of nationwide controversies, including commissioning a $450,000 ARS-gubernatorial baton for his inauguration ceremony, replacing the entire provincial cabinet (including the chief of police), increasing the governor's salary by 66%, and reincorporating a convicted thief to the provincial government.

Political offices
Preceded by Roberto Crocianelli	Vice Governor of Tierra del Fuego; 2015–2019	Succeeded by Mónica Urquiza
Preceded by Rosana Bertone	Governor of Tierra del Fuego; 2019	Succeeded by Gustavo Melella
