= María Eugenia Duré =

Argentine politician (born 1980)

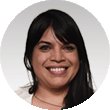

National Senator
- Incumbent
- Assumed office 10 December 2019
- Constituency: Tierra del Fuego

Personal details
- Born: 17 March 1980 (age 46) Paraná, Argentina
- Party: Justicialist Party
- Other political affiliations: Front for Victory (2015–2017); Frente de Todos (since 2019)
- Profession: Journalist, politician

María Eugenia Duré (born 17 March 1980) is an Argentine journalist and politician currently serving as a National Senator for Tierra del Fuego. A member of the Justicialist Party and La Cámpora, Duré was elected in 2019, and currently sits in the Frente de Todos parliamentary bloc.

== Early life ==
Duré was born on 17 March 1980 in Paraná, Entre Ríos. She moved with her family to Río Gallegos, Santa Cruz, at an early age, later settling in Ushuaia and Río Grande, in Tierra del Fuego.

She studied sports journalism in Buenos Aires, later working in radio and television. She worked for Radio Nacional Buenos Aires from 2004 to 2009, and as the Tierra del Fuego correspondent at the Estudio País 24 segment of Televisión Pública Argentina from 2006 to 2009. She moved back to Río Grande in 2010, and became employed at Radio Nacional Río Grande as a presenter and producer, before being ascended to director.

== Political career ==
As a member of La Cámpora, a kirchnerist youth organization within the Front for Victory, Duré ran for a seat in the Río Grande City Council in the 2015 local elections. She was elected, and held the seat until 2019. In the 2019 legislative elections, Duré was the second candidate in the Frente de Todos list to the National Senate in Tierra del Fuego, behind Matías David Rodríguez. The list was the most-voted in the province, with 41.12% of the vote, granting both Rodríguez and Duré the two seats for the majority.

As a national senator, she was vice president of the parliamentary commission on Population and Human Development, and secretary of the bicameral commission on Consumer Rights. In addition, she formed part of the commissions on Foreign Affairs, Agriculture, Media and Freedom of Expression, Environment, Tourism, Education and Culture, Sports, Health, Women's Affairs, and the joint parliamentary commission on Argentina–Chile relations. She voted in favour of the legalisation of abortion in Argentina in 2018 and 2020.

In November 2020, she was designated as one of the Senate's two representatives to the Federal Council on Human Trafficking, alongside San Luis senator María Eugenia Catalfamo.
