= Héctor Stefani =

Argentine politician (1959–2024)

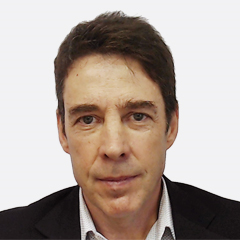
- Stefani in 2017

National Deputy
- In office 10 December 2017 – 12 October 2024
- Constituency: Tierra de Fuego

Personal details
- Born: 6 November 1959 Las Flores, Buenos Aires Province, Argentina
- Died: 12 October 2024 (aged 64) Buenos Aires, Argentina
- Party: Republican Proposal
- Education: National University of Patagonia San Juan Bosco

Héctor Antonio "Tito" Stefani (6 November 1959 – 12 October 2024) was an Argentine politician. A member of Republican Proposal (PRO), he was a member of the Chamber of Deputies of Argentina from 2017 until his death in 2024.

== Biography ==
Stefani was born in Las Flores, Buenos Aires Province, on 6 November 1959. He studied to be a higher technician on maritime security at the Escuela de Prefectura Matías de Irigoyen, graduating in 1980. Later, he acquired a specialization on navigation at the Escuela Superior de Jefes y Oficiales in 1984. In 2003, he completed a licenciatura degree on political science at the National University of Patagonia San Juan Bosco.

He held numerous positions in the Port of Ushuaia, and served as secretary and undersecretary of the provincial government of Tierra del Fuego Province. In the 2017 legislative election, he was elected to the Argentine Chamber of Deputies as part of the Cambiemos list. He was re-elected in 2021.

He served as president of the Republican Proposal (PRO) party in Tierra del Fuego. In 2023, he unsuccessfully ran for governor of Tierra del Fuego Province.

Stefani died of skin cancer in Buenos Aires, on 12 October 2024, at the age of 64.
