= List of Argentine provinces by population =

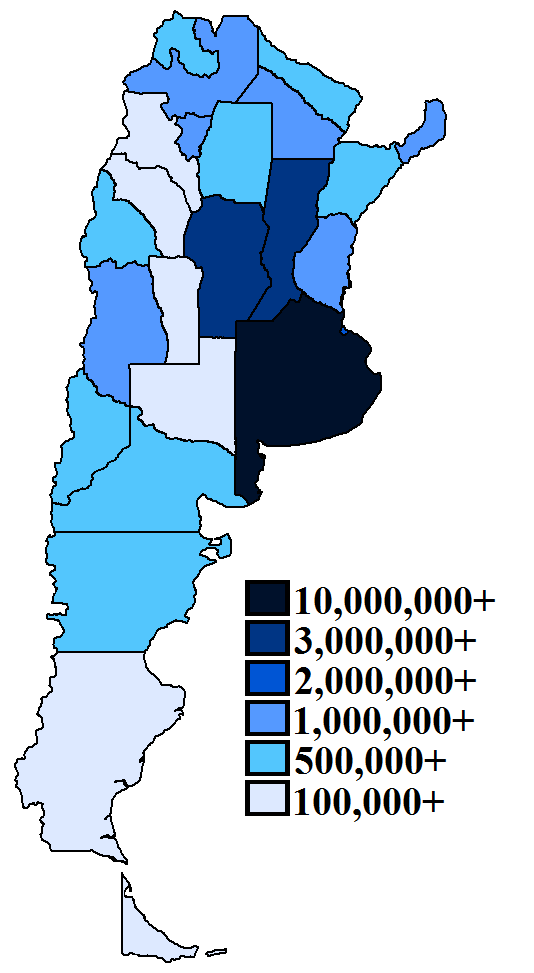
Map of each province's population as of 2010

The following table is a list of the 23 provinces and the Autonomous City of Buenos Aires of Argentina, ranked in order of their total population based on data from the 2026 and 2022 census from the National Institute of Statistics and Census of Argentina.

| Rank | Province/District | Population (2026) | Population (2022) |
|---|---|---|---|
| 1 | Buenos Aires | 17,794,009 | 17,569,053 |
| 2 | Córdoba | 3,927,355 | 3,978,984 |
| 3 | Santa Fe | 3,581,357 | 3,556,522 |
| 4 | City of Buenos Aires | 3,368,589 | 3,120,612 |
| 5 | Mendoza | 1,994,188 | 2,014,533 |
| 6 | Tucumán | 1,717,609 | 1,703,186 |
| 7 | Salta | 1,457,878 | 1,440,672 |
| 8 | Entre Ríos | 1,453,314 | 1,426,426 |
| 9 | Misiones | 1,372,303 | 1,280,960 |
| 10 | Chaco | 1,322,706 | 1,142,963 |
| 11 | Corrientes | 1,223,660 | 1,197,553 |
| 12 | Santiago del Estero | 1,084,763 | 1,054,028 |
| 13 | San Juan | 823,494 | 818,234 |
| 14 | Río Negro | 815,983 | 762,067 |
| 15 | Neuquén | 787,223 | 726,590 |
| 16 | Jujuy | 765,300 | 797,955 |
| 17 | Formosa | 641,862 | 606,041 |
| 18 | Chubut | 626,933 | 603,120 |
| 19 | San Luis | 542,292 | 540,905 |
| 20 | Catamarca | 440,236 | 429,556 |
| 21 | La Rioja | 399,497 | 384,607 |
| 22 | La Pampa | 380,359 | 366,022 |
| 23 | Santa Cruz | 356,618 | 333,473 |
| 24 | Tierra del Fuego | 192,689 | 190,641 |
| Total | Argentina | 47,070,217 | 46,044,703 |
