= Evita Movement =

Evita Movement Movimiento Evita
- Secretary-General: Emilio Pérsico
- Founded: June 2004; 21 years ago
- Headquarters: Buenos Aires
- Youth wing: Evita Peronist Youth
- Ideology: Kirchnerism
- Political position: Left-wing
- National affiliation: Homeland Force
- Regional affiliation: São Paulo Forum
- Mercosur Parliament group: Grupo Progresista
- Colors: White, Blue
- Senators: 0 / 72
- Deputies: 2 / 257
- Governors: 0 / 24
- Mercosur Parliamentarians: 1 / 43

Website
- movimiento-evita.org.ar

The Evita Movement (Spanish: Movimiento Evita) is a social, piquetero and political movement of Argentina, which is defined by Peronist, national, popular, and revolutionary ideology. Its name was adopted as a tribute to the Argentine popular political leader and First Lady Eva Perón.

It was created in 2004 and was part of the Front for Victory. Its general secretary is Emilio Pérsico. Other major figures of the movement are National Deputies Leonardo Grosso (former chairman of the Movement's in the lower house), the journalist Fernando "Chino" Navarro, Gildo Onorato, Silvia Horne, Remo Carlotto, Lucila De Ponti, and Araceli Ferreyra, former senators Juan Manuel Abal Medina Jr. and Teresita Luna, and Evita-UTEP liaison Esteban Castro.

In 2016, it separated from the parliamentary bloc Front for Victory, forming one of its own called Peronism for Victory. Now, it supports Alberto Fernández and is part of Frente de Todos, a new Peronist coalition. In 2023 it created a new political party, "La Patria de los comunes", to be part of the Frente de Todos in a more formal capacity.

== History ==
The Evita Movement emerged in 2004, as a result of the union of diverse groups from the Quebracho Revolutionary Patriotic Movement and the Anibal Verón Current of Unemployed Workers, with roots mainly in the suburbs of Buenos Aires.

In its first year, the Evita Movement organized itself as a piquetero unemployed movement (MTD), but later redefined its purpose to reorganize itself as a popular revolutionary wing of Kirchnerism, acting with ample autonomy both inside and outside the Justicialist Party (PJ). In 2007, Emilio Pérsico was named secretary of Territorial Organizations of the PJ. One of the unusual characteristics of the Evita Movement is that its electoral secretary has lacked interest in holding political office.

The Evita Movement, like other movements of the unemployed, grants a central role to the organization of its members to work cooperatively, mainly in the construction of popular housing, financed by the state. The popular power policy of the Evita Movement was explained in these terms by one of its members:

The popular organization determines the possibility for participants' appropriation of public policy decisions and of the allocation of resources. And this generates a much more solid relationship of public policy [with the beneficiaries] that makes this process more difficult to reverse. When a person in a cooperative builds fifty houses, how can you tell him that he no longer has his job? On the other hand, when the houses are built by a company, the company just submits another tender to the state. This does not produce a relationship of power in which the active participants are the people. We call this social policy, as Evita [Perón] called it: "the organized popular force", "the popular power".

It participated in the 2017 legislative election, joining the Citizen's Unity electoral front.

== Electoral performance ==
=== President ===
Election year	Candidate	Coalition	1st round		2nd round		Result
Election year	Candidate	Coalition	# of overall votes	% of overall vote	# of overall votes	% of overall vote	Result
2011	Cristina Kirchner	Front for Victory	11,865,055	54.11 (1st)	—N/a		✓ Elected
2015	Daniel Scioli	Front for Victory	9,338,449	37.08 (1st)	12,198,441	48.60 (2nd)	✗ 2-R Defeated
2019	Alberto Fernández	Frente de Todos	12,473,709	48.10 (1st)	—N/a		✓ Elected

=== Chamber of Deputies ===
Election year	Votes	%	seats won	total seats	position	presidency	notes
2009	5,544,069	28.70 (#2nd)	2	5 / 257	Minority	Cristina Fernández de Kirchner (PJ—FPV)	within Front for Victory
2011	10,793,689	52.46 (#1st)	5	7 / 257	Minority	Cristina Fernández de Kirchner (PJ—FPV)	within Front for Victory
2013	7,422,451	32.82 (#1st)	1	6 / 257	Minority	Cristina Fernández de Kirchner (PJ—FPV)	within Front for Victory
2015	8,797,279	37.41 (#1st)	4	6 / 257	Minority	Mauricio Macri (PRO—Cambiemos)	within Front for Victory
2017	5,265,069	21.03 (#2nd)	0	4 / 257	Minority	Mauricio Macri (PRO—Cambiemos)	within Citizen's Unity
2019	11,359,508	45.50 (#1st)	1	2 / 257	Minority	Alberto Fernández (PJ—FDT)	within Frente de Todos
