= United Republicans =

Argentinian political party

United Republicans Republicanos Unidos
- Abbreviation: RU
- Leader: Ricardo López Murphy
- Founded: 9 November 2020; 5 years ago
- Split from: Republican Proposal
- Headquarters: City of Buenos Aires
- Ideology: Radicalism; Republican liberalism Economic liberalism Conservatism; Libertarianism
- Political position: Center-right
- National affiliation: La Libertad Avanza
- Regional affiliation: Liberal Network for Latin America (associate)
- Colors: Violet
- Seats in the Chamber of Deputies: 1 / 257
- Seats in the Senate: 0 / 72
- CABA Legislature: 1 / 60

Website
- www.republicanosunidos.com.ar

United Republicans (Spanish: Republicanos Unidos, RU) is a political party from Argentina, founded on November 9, 2020, with its main representative being Deputy Ricardo López Murphy. The party has definitive legal status in the Autonomous City of Buenos Aires, Province of Córdoba, and in the Province of Tierra del Fuego, in addition to having provisional status in the Province of Corrientes and in the Province of Buenos Aires.

It is a member of Together for Change in the provinces of Buenos Aires, Córdoba and Mendoza, while in Tierra del Fuego, Antarctica and the South Atlantic Islands it is part of the La Libertad Avanza front.

The party participated for the first time in the 2021 legislative elections.
