= Jorge Alberto Garramuño =

Argentine politician (1953–2015)

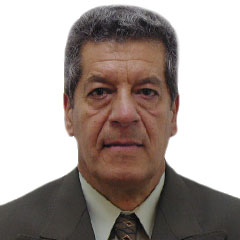
Jorge Alberto Garramuño

Jorge Alberto Garramuño (14 September 1953 – 7 September 2015) was an Argentine politician who was a Senator for the Fueguian People's Movement between 2013 and 2015. He began his political career as Minister of Public Works of Tierra del Fuego in 1992. He died on 7 September 2015 in Buenos Aires.
