= Governor of Tierra del Fuego =

Governor of Tierra del Fuego, Antarctica and South Atlantic Islands
- Gobernador de Tierra del Fuego, Antártida e Islas del Atlántico Sur
- Provincial Coat of arms

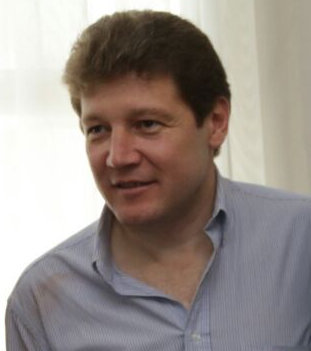
- Incumbent; Gustavo Melella since 17 December 2019
- Appointer: Direct popular vote
- Term length: 4 years
- Inaugural holder: Félix Mariano Paz
- Formation: 25 November 1884
- Website: www.tierradelfuego.gov.ar

The Governor of Tierra del Fuego, Antarctica and South Atlantic Islands (Spanish: Gobernador de Tierra del Fuego, Antártida e Islas del Atlántico Sur) is the highest executive officer of the Argentine province of Tierra del Fuego. The Governor is directly elected by the people of the province for a four-year term. A Vice Governor (vicegobernador) is elected at the same time and can assume office in the absence, death or suspension of the Governor. The current governor of Tierra del Fuego is Gustavo Melella, elected in 2019.

The office of Governor was created in 1884, when it was a position appointed by the Government of Argentina. Argentina claims Argentine Antarctica, the Falkland Islands, and South Georgia and the South Sandwich Islands as part of its territory (although these regions are governed as overseas territories of the United Kingdom) and in 1957 they were added to the National Territory of Tierra del Fuego (which became known as Tierra del Fuego, Antarctica and South Atlantic Islands). During the Argentine occupation of the Falkland Islands, the South Atlantic Islands were removed from the jurisdiction of the Government of Tierra del Fuego, although they were officially returned in 1985. On 17 May 1991, Tierra del Fuego became a full-fledged province of the Argentine Republic.

== List of governors ==
=== Governors of the National Territory of Tierra del Fuego ===
Governor	Took office	Left office	Notes
Félix Mariano Paz	25 November 1884	6 June 1890	
Mario Cornero	1890	1893	
Pedro Godoy	1893	1899	
Félix A. Carrié	1899	1902	
Esteban Deloqui	1902	1905	
Manuel Fernández Valdés	1905	1918	
Haroldo Simesen de Bielke; Cayetano Ripoll; Juan Grandón; Avelino Jiménez; Esteban Repetto	1918	1920	Interim Governors
Carlos C. Molina	1920	1923	
José María Gómez	1924	1932	
Mario Siches	1932	1935	
Carlos Moneta	1935	1939	
Gregorio Báez	1939	1942	
Horacio Rotondaro	21 October 1942	1943	
José María Gómez	1943	21 September 1943	
In 1943, the Gobernación Marítima de Tierra del Fuego was established.
Fidel Anadón	21 September 1943	1 January 1944	
Gregorio Portillo	1 January 1944	12 February 1946	
Fidel Degaudenzi	12 February 1946	2 November 1947	
Mario Sánchez Negrete	2 November 1947	1947	
Antonio Pietranera	1947	1948	
Horacio Howard	January 1948	17 January 1948	
Manlio Buldrini	17 January 1948	24 September 1949	
Pedro Cases	24 September 1949	17 January 1950	
Guillermo Carro Catáneo	17 January 1950	17 January 1952	
Jorge E. Suaya	17 January 1952	1954	
Carlos Suárez Doriga	1954	1954	
Juan José Jáuregui	1 January 1955	1955	
José María Guzmán	1955	1957	
In 1957, the National territory of Tierra del Fuego, Antarctica and South Atlantic Islands was established.
Pedro C. Florido	1957	7 June 1958	
Ernesto M. Campos	7 June 1958	December 1965	
Ruperto Bilbao	December 1965	10 July 1966	
José María Guzmán	10 July 1966	1969	
Gregorio Lloret	1969	13 June 1973	
Mariano Loedel	20 June 1973	1974	
Justo G. Padilla	1974	1975	
Gregorio Lloret	1975	1976	
Jorge Arigoti	1976	1981	
On 3 April 1982 (following the invasion and occupation of the Falkland Islands and their dependencies by the Argentine military junta) the South Atlantic Islands were removed from the jurisdiction of Tierra del Fuego.
Raúl E. Suárez del Cerro	1981	10 December 1983	
Ramón Alberto Trejo Noel	10 December 1983	15 May 1984	
Jorge Néstor Vera	17 May 1984	15 July 1984	
On 15 May 1985, the South Atlantic Islands were returned to the jurisdiction of Tierra del Fuego (although in reality they are under British administration).
Adolfo Luis Sciurano	15 July 1984	26 May 1986	
Alfredo A. Ferro	26 May 1986	12 December 1987	
Helios Eseverri	12 December 1987	13 July 1989	
Carlos Martín Torres	13 July 1989	1991	
Adrián Aquiles Fariña	1991	17 January 1991	
Matilde Svatetz de Menéndez	17 January 1991	10 January 1992	Federal interventor

=== Governors of Tierra del Fuego Province ===
Governor	Term in office	Party	Election	Vice Governor
José Arturo Estabillo	10 January 1992 – 4 November 1997	MOPOF	1991	Miguel Ángel Castro
José Arturo Estabillo	10 January 1992 – 4 November 1997	MOPOF	1995	Miguel Ángel Castro
Miguel Ángel Castro	4 November 1997 – 10 December 1997	MOPOF	1995	Vacant
José Arturo Estabillo	10 December 1997 – 10 January 2000	MOPOF	1995	Miguel Ángel Castro
Carlos Manfredotti	10 January 2000 – 10 January 2004	PJ	1999	Daniel Gallo
Jorge Colazo	10 January 2004 – 2 December 2005	UCR	2003	Hugo Cóccaro
Hugo Cóccaro	2 December 2005 – 17 December 2007	PJ	2003	Vacant
Fabiana Ríos	17 December 2007 – 17 December 2015	ARI	2007	Carlos Basanetti
Fabiana Ríos	17 December 2007 – 17 December 2015	PSP	2011	Roberto Crocianelli
Rosana Bertone	17 December 2015 – 10 December 2019	PJ	2015	Juan Carlos Arcando
Juan Carlos Arcando	10 December 2019 – 17 December 2019	PJ	2015	Vacant
Gustavo Melella	17 December 2019 – Incumbent	FORJA	2019	Mónica Urquiza
Gustavo Melella	17 December 2019 – Incumbent	FORJA	2023	Mónica Urquiza

== See also ==
- Legislature of Tierra del Fuego
