= Fuegian People's Movement =

Argentine political party

Fuegian People's Movement Movimiento Popular Fueguino
- Abbreviation: MOPOF
- Leader: Miriam Boyadjian
- Founded: 8 May 1985; 40 years ago
- Merger of: Feguian People's Union; Neighbourhood Group
- Headquarters: Kayén y Kupanaka, Ushuaia
- Ideology: Regionalism
- National affiliation: Frente de Todos
- Argentine Chamber of Deputies (Tierra del Fuego seats): 0 / 5
- Argentine Senate (Tierra del Fuego seats): 0 / 3
- Seats in the Tierra del Fuego Legislature: 4 / 15

Website
- Official website

The Fuegian People's Movement (Spanish: Movimiento Popular Fueguino; MOPOF) is a provincial political party in the Tierra del Fuego Province of Argentina. It was formed in 1985, becoming the first provincial political party in Tierra del Fuego; for most of its history, it was one of the main political parties in the province.

== Electoral results ==
=== Chamber of Deputies ===
Election year	Votes	%	seats won	total seats	position	presidency	notes
1985	3,582	23,12 (#3rd)	0	0 / 2	Minority	Raúl Alfonsín (UCR)	
1991	2,309	8.30 (#3rd)	2	2 / 5	Minority	Carlos Menem (PJ)	
1991	9,704	38.11 (#1st)	2	2 / 5	Minority	Carlos Menem (PJ)	
1993	7,972	26.09 (#2nd)	1	3 / 5	Majority	Carlos Menem (PJ)	
1995	7,683	22.49 (#2nd)	1	2 / 5	Minority	Carlos Menem (PJ)	
1997	10,740	28,23 (#2nd)	1	2 / 5	Minority	Carlos Menem (PJ)	
1999	4,562	11.62 (#4th)	0	1 / 5	Minority	Fernando de la Rúa (UCR—Alliance)	
2001	4,660	13.44 (#4th)	0	0 / 5	Extra-parliamentary	Eduardo Duhalde (PJ)	
2003	3,731	8.21 (#4th)	0	0 / 5	Extra-parliamentary	Néstor Kirchner (PJ—FPV)	
2005	9,447	18.30 (#3rd)	0	0 / 5	Extra-parliamentary	Néstor Kirchner (PJ—FPV)	
2007	2,216	4.47 (#9th)	0	0 / 5	Extra-parliamentary	Cristina Fernández de Kirchner (PJ—FPV)	
2009	2,242	3.68 (#7th)	0	0 / 5	Extra-parliamentary	Cristina Fernández de Kirchner (PJ—FPV)	
2011	13,788	22.54 (#2nd)	1	1 / 5	Minority	Cristina Fernández de Kirchner (PJ—FPV)	
2013	12,796	17.08 (#3rd)	0	1 / 5	Minority	Cristina Fernández de Kirchner (PJ—FPV)	
2015	5,608	7.17 (#4th)	0	0 / 5	Extra-parliamentary	Mauricio Macri (PRO—Cambiemos)	
2017	—N/a		0	0 / 5	Extra-parliamentary	Mauricio Macri (PRO—Cambiemos)	did not participate
2019	—N/a		0	0 / 5	Extra-parliamentary	Alberto Fernández (PJ—FDT)	did not participate

=== Senate ===
Election year	Votes	%	seats won	total seats	position	presidency	notes
1991	—N/a		2	2 / 3	Majority	Carlos Menem (PJ)	indirect election
1995	—N/a		2	2 / 5	Majority	Carlos Menem (PJ)	indirect election
2001	2,757	7.71 (#5th)	0	0 / 3	Extra-parliamentary	Eduardo Duhalde (PJ)	
2007	1,585	3.11 (#10th)	0	0 / 3	Extra-parliamentary	Cristina Fernández de Kirchner (PJ—FPV)	
2013	15,639	22.37 (#2nd)	1	1 / 3	Minority	Cristina Fernández de Kirchner (PJ—FPV)	
2019	—N/a		0	0 / 3	Extra-parliamentary	Alberto Fernández (PJ—FDT)	did not participate

=== Tierra del Fuego governorship ===
Election year	Candidate	Coalition	1st round		2nd round		Result
Election year	Candidate	Coalition	# of overall votes	% of overall vote	# of overall votes	% of overall vote	Result
1991	José Arturo Estabillo	—N/a	12,414	45.41	12,395	50.59	✓ 2-R Elected
1995	José Arturo Estabillo	—N/a	22,232	57.99	—N/a		✓ 1-R Elected
1999	Roque Martinelli	—N/a	9,635	22.32	—N/a		✗ 1-R Defeated
2003	Jorge Alberto Garramuño	—N/a	9,172	18.96	—N/a		✗ 1-R Defeated
2007	Jorge Alberto Garramuño	MOPOF+UCR (Note: The MOPOF+UCR formula received, in total, 16,094 votes (30.25%), in the first round.)	9,461	17.78	—N/a		✗ 1-R Defeated
2011	—N/a						did not participate
2015	Federico Sciurano	Unite Tierra del Fuego (Note: Unite Tierra del Fuego received, in total, 30,781 votes (39.71%), in the first round.)	6,736	8.69	41,737	48.09	✗ 2-R Defeated
2019	Gustavo Melella	Concertación Fueguina (Note: Concentración Fueguina received, in total, 50,329 votes (55.03%).)	8,502	9.30	—N/a		✓ 1-R Elected

=== Tierra del Fuego provincial legislature ===
Election year	Votes	%	seats won	position
1987	2,141	20.87	3 / 15	Minority
1987	3,381	21.90	4 / 15	Minority
1987	3,760	15.93	2 / 15	Minority
1989	2,840	10.40	1 / 15	Minority
1991	No data		7 / 15	Minority
1995	14,311	40.06	7 / 15	Minority
1999	12,352	32.06	5 / 15	Minority
2003	8,131	20.12	4 / 15	Minority
2007	5,577	11.91	3 / 15	Minority
2011	6,153	11.35	3 / 15	Minority
2015	6,719	9.90	4 / 15	Minority
2019	7,971	10.91	2 / 15	Minority
