= Legislature of Tierra del Fuego =

Legislative body of Tierra del Fuego Province, Argentina

Type
- Type: Unicameral

Leadership
- President (Vice Governor): Mónica Urquiza (MOPOF) since 10 December 2019
- First Vice President: Myriam Noemí Martínez (PJ/FDT) since 10 December 2019
- Second Vice President: Liliana Martínez Allende, UCR since 10 December 2019

Structure
- Seats: 15 legislators
- Political groups: Government (6): FORJA (4); MOPOF (2); Opposition (9): Green Party (3); UCR (2); FDT–PJ (2); Provincial PJ (2)
- Length of term: 4 years
- Authority: Constitution of Tierra del Fuego

Elections
- Voting system: Proportional representation
- Last election: 2023
- Next election: 2027

Website
- legistdf.gov.ar

The Legislature of Tierra del Fuego, Antarctica and South Atlantic Islands (Spanish: Legislatura de la provincia de Tierra del Fuego, Antártida e Islas del Atlántico Sur) is the unicameral legislative body of Tierra del Fuego Province, in Argentina. It comprises 15 legislators, elected in a single province-wide multi-member district that encompasses the entirety of the province's territory.

The legislature was established in 1983, as the legislature of the National Territory of Tierra del Fuego. In 1990, the territory became the 23rd province of Argentina, and the first such legislature was elected in 1991, alongside the first democratically elected governor. Elections to the legislature take place every four years, when the entirety of its members are renewed. The legislature is presided by the Vice Governor of Tierra del Fuego, who is elected alongside the governor every four years.

The legislature formerly convened at the Old Government House, on Maipú Avenue, Ushuaia. Although the old building is still used for ceremonial purposes and as headquarters of the vice governorship, legislative sessions are held in a new building on Yaganes 683, Ushuaia.

Since 2019, the president of the legislature has been Mónica Urquiza, of the Fueguian People's Movement (MOPOF). Urquiza was elected in the gubernatorial ticket of Gustavo Melella.
