= Gustavo Melella =

Argentine politician (born 1970)

Gustavo Adrián Melella
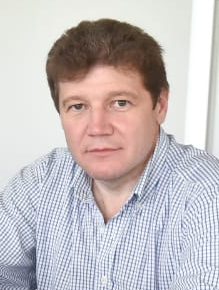

Governor of Tierra del Fuego, Antarctica and Southern Atlantic Islands
- Incumbent
- Assumed office 17 December 2019
- Vice Governor: Mónica Urquiza
- Preceded by: Juan Carlos Arcando

Mayor of Río Grande
- In office 14 December 2011 – 17 December 2019
- Preceded by: Jorge Martín
- Succeeded by: Martín Pérez

Personal details
- Born: Gustavo Adrián Melella; 2 December 1970 (age 55) San Justo, Buenos Aires, Argentina
- Party: FORJA Concertation Party (2010–present)

Gustavo Adrián Melella (born 2 December 1970) is an Argentine politician who has been the governor of Tierra del Fuego Province since December 2019. He was previously mayor of Río Grande from 2011 to 2019. He is the first openly gay governor of an Argentine province.

He belongs to the FORJA Concertation Party.

== Early life ==
Melella was born in San Justo, Buenos Aires Province, in 1970 and attended a Salesian school in Almagro. When he was 26 years old, he moved to Río Grande in Tierra del Fuego Province, becoming a philosophy lecturer at a Salesian School. In 2002, he was made rector.

== Political career ==
From 2004 to 2005, Melella worked as the director of local development in the Río Grande municipal government and from 2005 to 2011, he was secretary of production. In 2011, he was elected mayor of the city of Río Grande and was re-elected in 2015.

Melella was elected governor of Tierra del Fuego, Antarctica and Southern Atlantic Islands on 16 June 2019, defeating the incumbent Rosana Bertone in the first round. His "Let's All Live Better" coalition included his own FORJA party as well as the regionalist Fueguian People's Movement (MOPOF), to which vice-gubernatorial candidate Mónica Urquiza belongs. Melella and Urquiza were both sworn in on 17 December 2019.

In the 14 May 2023 provincial elections, Melella was re-elected to a second term with 51.26% of the votes.

== Personal life ==
Melella is openly gay. In a radio interview on 18 June 2019, he revealed he has been in a same-sex relationship for 16 years.

== Electoral history ==
Electoral history of Gustavo Melella
Election	Office	List	Votes			Result	Ref.
Election	Office	List	Total	%	P.	Result	Ref.
2011	Mayor of Río Grande	Radical Civic Union	13,248	33.62%	1st	Elected	
2015	Mayor of Río Grande	Front for Victory	26,253	53.28%	1st	Elected	
2019	Governor of Tierra del Fuego	Fuegian Concertation	50,329	55.03%	1st	Elected	
2023	Governor of Tierra del Fuego	United, We Make Future	52,438	65.37%	1st	Elected	

Political offices
Preceded by Juan Carlos Arcando	Governor of Tierra del Fuego; 2019–present	Incumbent
