= FORJA Concertation Party =

FORJA Concertation Party Partido de la Concertación FORJA
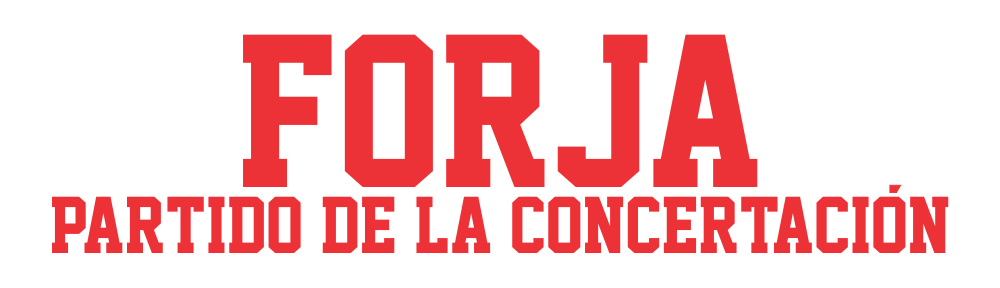
- President: Gustavo López
- Founded: 1 September 2008; 17 years ago
- Split from: Radical Civic Union
- Preceded by: Plural Consensus
- Headquarters: Av. Estado de Israel 4622, Buenos Aires
- Ideology: K Radicalism; Social democracy Progressivism
- Political position: Centre-left
- National affiliation: Homeland Force
- Colours: Red
- Seats in the Chamber of Deputies: 1 / 257
- Seats in the Senate: 0 / 72
- Province Governors: 1 / 24

Website
- https://forja.org/

The FORJA Concertation Party (Spanish: Partido de la Concertación FORJA) is a centre-left political party in Argentina. The party is a member of the political coalition Homeland Force. Previously, the party was a member of the Front for Victory.

The party has minor representation in the Argentine Chamber of Deputies: Mabel Caparrós, national deputy from Tierra del Fuego, was elected in 2019. In 2019, FORJA also gained its first-ever provincial governor: Gustavo Melella, also of Tierra del Fuego.

== History ==
The party takes its name from the historical organization FORJA (Spanish: Fuerza de Orientación Radical de la Joven Argentina; lit. "Young Argentina Radical Orientation Force"), which existed from 1935 to 1945. Like the historical Forja, the Concertation Party is of Radical origins but is ideologically and politically closer to Peronism.

== Electoral performance ==
=== President ===
Election year	Candidate	Coalition	1st round		2nd round		Result
Election year	Candidate	Coalition	# of overall votes	% of overall vote	# of overall votes	% of overall vote	Result
2011	Cristina Kirchner	Front for Victory	11,865,055	54.11 (1st)	—N/a		✓ Elected
2015	Daniel Scioli	Front for Victory	9,338,449	37.08 (1st)	12,198,441	48.60 (2nd)	✗ 2-R Defeated
2019	Alberto Fernández	Frente de Todos	12,473,709	48.10 (1st)	—N/a		✓ Elected

== See also ==
- Radicales K
- Front for Victory
- Plural Consensus
