= Río Grande, Tierra del Fuego =

Río Grande
- City
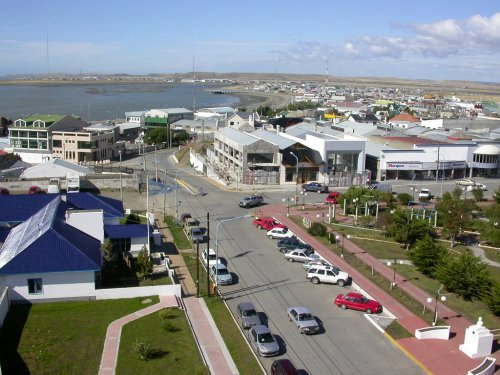
- Río Grande

- Seal

- Location in Argentina
- Coordinates: 53°47′S 67°42′W
- Country: Argentina
- Province: Tierra del Fuego
- Department: Río Grande
- Established: 11 July 1921

Government
  - Type: Municipality
  - Intendant: Martín Pérez (PJ)

Area
  - Total: 12,181 km^{2} (4,703 sq mi)
- Elevation: 0 m (0 ft)

Population (2022 Census)
  - Total: 98,017
  - Density: 8.0467/km^{2} (20.841/sq mi)
- Time zone: UTC−3 (ART)
- CPA Base: V 9420
- Area code: +54 2964
- Climate: Dfc/Cfc
- Website: riogrande.gob.ar/mun/index.php/es/

Río Grande (English: Big River) is a city in Argentina, on the north coast of the eastern part of the Isla Grande de Tierra del Fuego. It has a population of 98,017, and is the industrial capital of the Tierra del Fuego Province. It is located 212 kilometres (132 mi) north-east of Ushuaia, the capital of the province.

It is served by Hermes Quijada International Airport.

== History ==
Sheep farming, as many other places in Patagonia, was the main impetus for population settlements beginning in the late 19th century.

Abundant rivers, the seacoast, and good pastures were some of the reasons that fueled population growth. Río Grande was founded on 11 July 1921, when the central government issued a decree recognising this locality as the "Agricultural Colony of Río Grande".

In the beginning, the land was subdivided among a few families, owning large estates until the agrarian reform of 1925. Cattle raising became one of the most important economic activities in the area.

In 2014, the city came into international scrutiny after a mob of some 300 vehicles blocked the escape of the support staff for the BBC Television program Top Gear after they had already been attacked with eggs and stones in Tolhuin, on a protest that started after their car plate resembled the Falkland Islands dispute. Arriving at the river border crossing, the crew had to illegally cross the border with Chile, after the crew was temporarily expelled from the province, which their crossing was successful.

== Economy ==
To promote industrial development, Tierra del Fuego is excluded from VAT and federal income tax. As a result, several manufacturing companies, particularly those involving electronic products, have opened factories in this city.

The city's population has grown rapidly since 1980. Many people have relocated from the northern parts of Argentina and from other countries, such as Bolivia, to work in factories that offer higher wages than other provinces of Argentina and also as a result of the television set production and assembly plants opened by ITT.

One of the most rapidly growing sectors is the production of laptops and netbooks. These products were totally imported until 2006 but by 2010, and due to initiatives under the Kirchner administrations, 42% of the Argentine market for these goods was supplied by firms established in Río Grande and Vicente López.

In April 2011, portfolio investments announced that they were planning to produce over 6.9 million units made in Tierra del Fuego Province, principally in Río Grande, which means more than a half of the sold netbooks in the country.

== Climate ==
Rio Grande's climate is strongly influenced by the ocean: generally quite cool, and sometimes very windy. It has a subpolar oceanic climate (Köppen Cfc) bordering on a subantarctic climate very rare for the Southern Hemisphere, with cool temperatures year round. It also closely borders on a cold semi-arid climate (Köppen BSk) and a tundra climate (Köppen ET). Temperatures in the warmest months, January and February average 11 °C (51.8 °F) while temperatures in the coolest month average 0 °C (32.0 °F). With a mean temperature of −0.3 °C (31.5 °F) in the coldest month, Río Grande has the coldest mean monthly temperature among cities in Argentina. Precipitation is low at around 330 millimetres (13 in). Also, due to its latitude, the length of the day varies tremendously across the year. Winter days can have as few as seven hours of sunlight, while summer days stretch to seventeen hours. Frost occurs throughout the year, and winter temperatures can remain below freezing for relatively long periods of time. As such, the frost free period is very short with the first date of frost being 23 February and the last date of frost being 22 November. During the summer, conditions are generally very windy and cloudy, and nights remain cold. Freak snowfalls can occur even in midsummer. The highest recorded temperature was 30.8 °C (87.4 °F) on 4 February 2019. It is believed that this is the southernmost recorded instance where temperatures exceed 30 °C (86 °F). The lowest recorded temperature was −22.2 °C (−8.0 °F) on 19 July 1984.

Climate data for Rio Grande, Argentina (1991–2020, extremes 1941–1950 and 1961–present) (Note: The record highs and lows are based on the Secretaria de Mineria link for the period 1941–1950 and from 1971 to 1990 while records beyond 1961 come from the Servicio Meteorológico Nacional link. When these 2 sources are used together, the record highs and lows are from the periods 1941–1950 and from 1961–present)
Month	Jan	Feb	Mar	Apr	May	Jun	Jul	Aug	Sep	Oct	Nov	Dec	Year
Record high °C (°F)	27.5 (81.5)	30.8 (87.4)	27.0 (80.6)	23.0 (73.4)	15.4 (59.7)	13.5 (56.3)	11.6 (52.9)	12.8 (55.0)	17.5 (63.5)	21.0 (69.8)	23.6 (74.5)	25.0 (77.0)	30.8 (87.4)
Mean daily maximum °C (°F)	16.0 (60.8)	15.7 (60.3)	13.6 (56.5)	10.6 (51.1)	6.8 (44.2)	3.4 (38.1)	3.2 (37.8)	5.4 (41.7)	8.2 (46.8)	11.4 (52.5)	13.4 (56.1)	14.9 (58.8)	10.2 (50.4)
Daily mean °C (°F)	11.0 (51.8)	10.4 (50.7)	8.4 (47.1)	5.7 (42.3)	2.9 (37.2)	0.3 (32.5)	0.1 (32.2)	1.6 (34.9)	3.6 (38.5)	6.2 (43.2)	8.5 (47.3)	10.0 (50.0)	5.7 (42.3)
Mean daily minimum °C (°F)	5.9 (42.6)	5.5 (41.9)	4.1 (39.4)	1.8 (35.2)	−0.5 (31.1)	−2.8 (27.0)	−3.0 (26.6)	−1.4 (29.5)	−0.1 (31.8)	1.6 (34.9)	3.5 (38.3)	4.9 (40.8)	1.6 (34.9)
Record low °C (°F)	−5.1 (22.8)	−6.0 (21.2)	−8.2 (17.2)	−13.2 (8.2)	−13.1 (8.4)	−20.0 (−4.0)	−22.2 (−8.0)	−14.9 (5.2)	−10.7 (12.7)	−8.2 (17.2)	−6.6 (20.1)	−5.5 (22.1)	−22.2 (−8.0)
Average precipitation mm (inches)	37.2 (1.46)	31.4 (1.24)	28.6 (1.13)	30.1 (1.19)	28.8 (1.13)	26.0 (1.02)	26.1 (1.03)	21.8 (0.86)	17.5 (0.69)	16.0 (0.63)	23.6 (0.93)	38.4 (1.51)	325.5 (12.81)
Average precipitation days (≥ 0.1 mm)	11.4	9.8	10.2	9.1	8.6	8.2	8.1	8.3	8.2	6.5	8.5	11.3	108.2
Average snowy days	0.0	0.1	0.3	0.5	1.1	3.4	4.2	3.4	2.3	0.9	0.2	0.1	16.5
Average relative humidity (%)	74.3	76.4	80.3	84.0	87.5	89.1	88.6	86.3	82.3	76.5	73.5	73.4	81.0
Mean monthly sunshine hours	198.4	161.0	142.6	117.0	96.1	72.0	83.7	111.6	135.0	182.9	198.0	201.5	1,699.8
Mean daily sunshine hours	6.4	5.7	4.6	3.9	3.1	2.4	2.7	3.6	4.5	5.9	6.6	6.5	4.6
Percentage possible sunshine	33	43	40	36	29	37	35	39	42	44	39	36	37.8
Source 1: Servicio Meteorológico Nacional
Source 2: Secretaria de Mineria (extremes and percent sun 1941–1950 and 1971–1990)

== Gallery ==
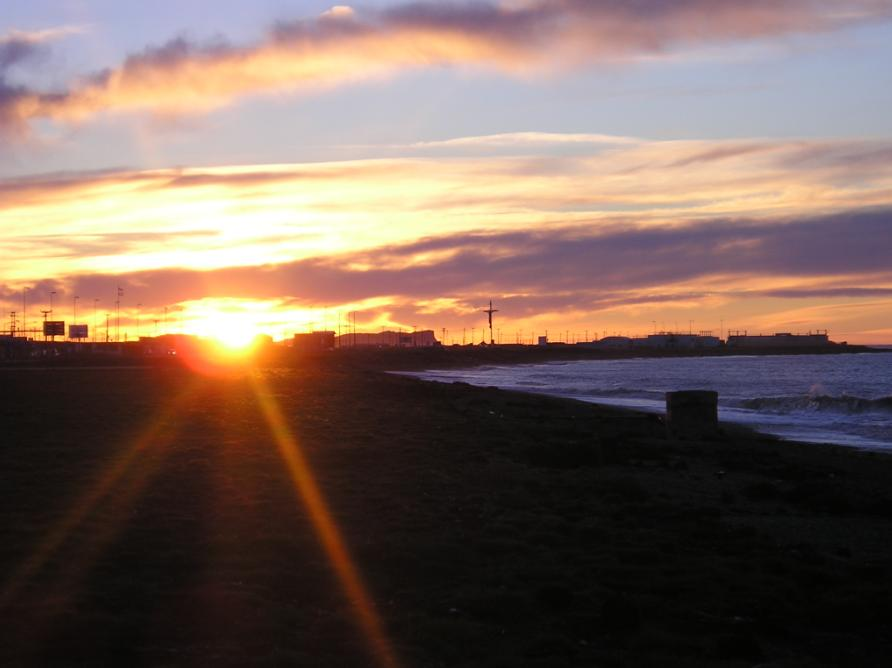
Río Grande at sunset

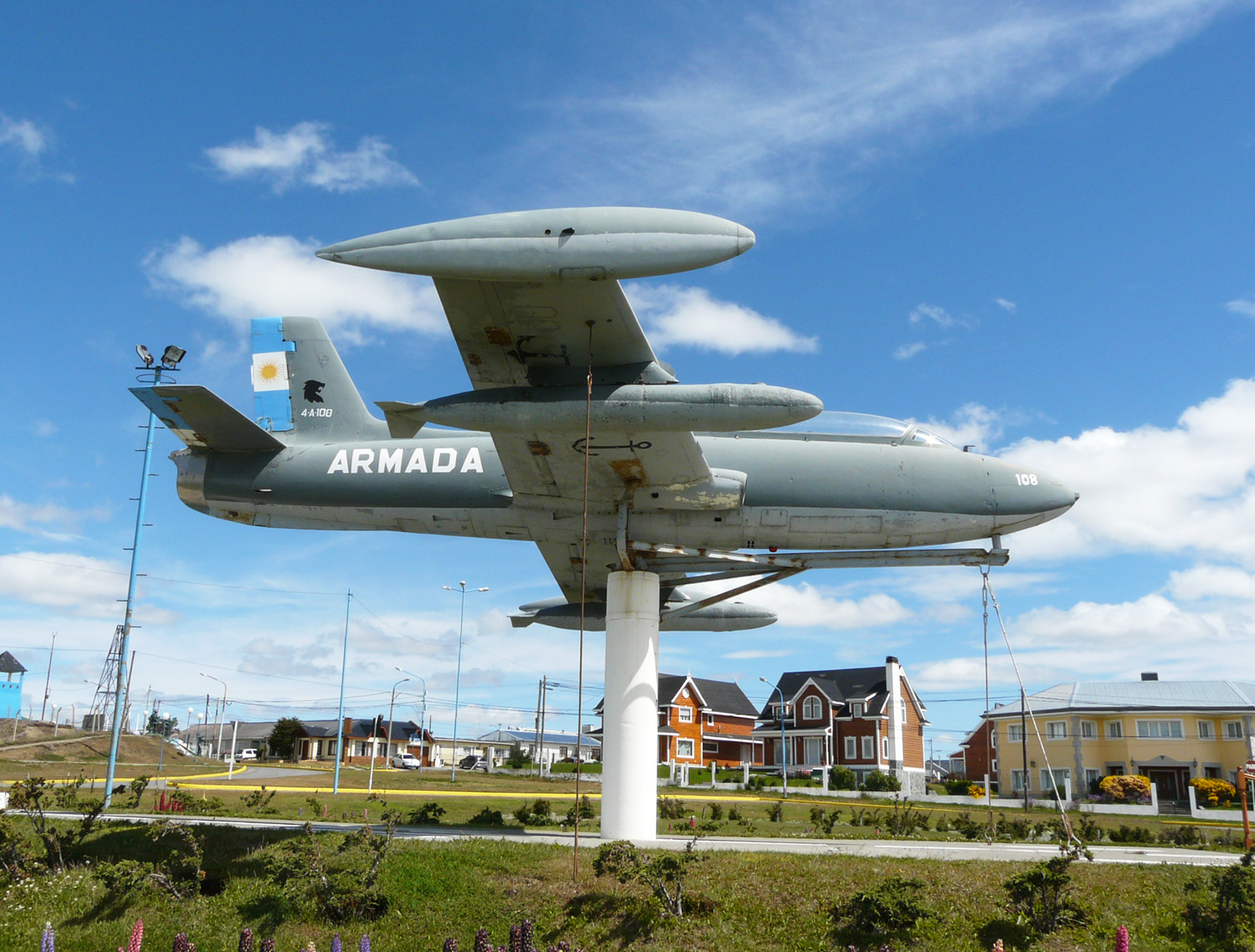
Argentine Navy MB326 monument

San Martín Avenue

== See also ==
- Ushuaia
