= Tierra del Fuego Province, Argentina =

Province in Argentina

Tierra del Fuego
- Province
- Province of Tierra del Fuego, Antarctica and South Atlantic Islands; Provincia de Tierra del Fuego, Antártida e Islas del Atlántico Sur (Spanish)
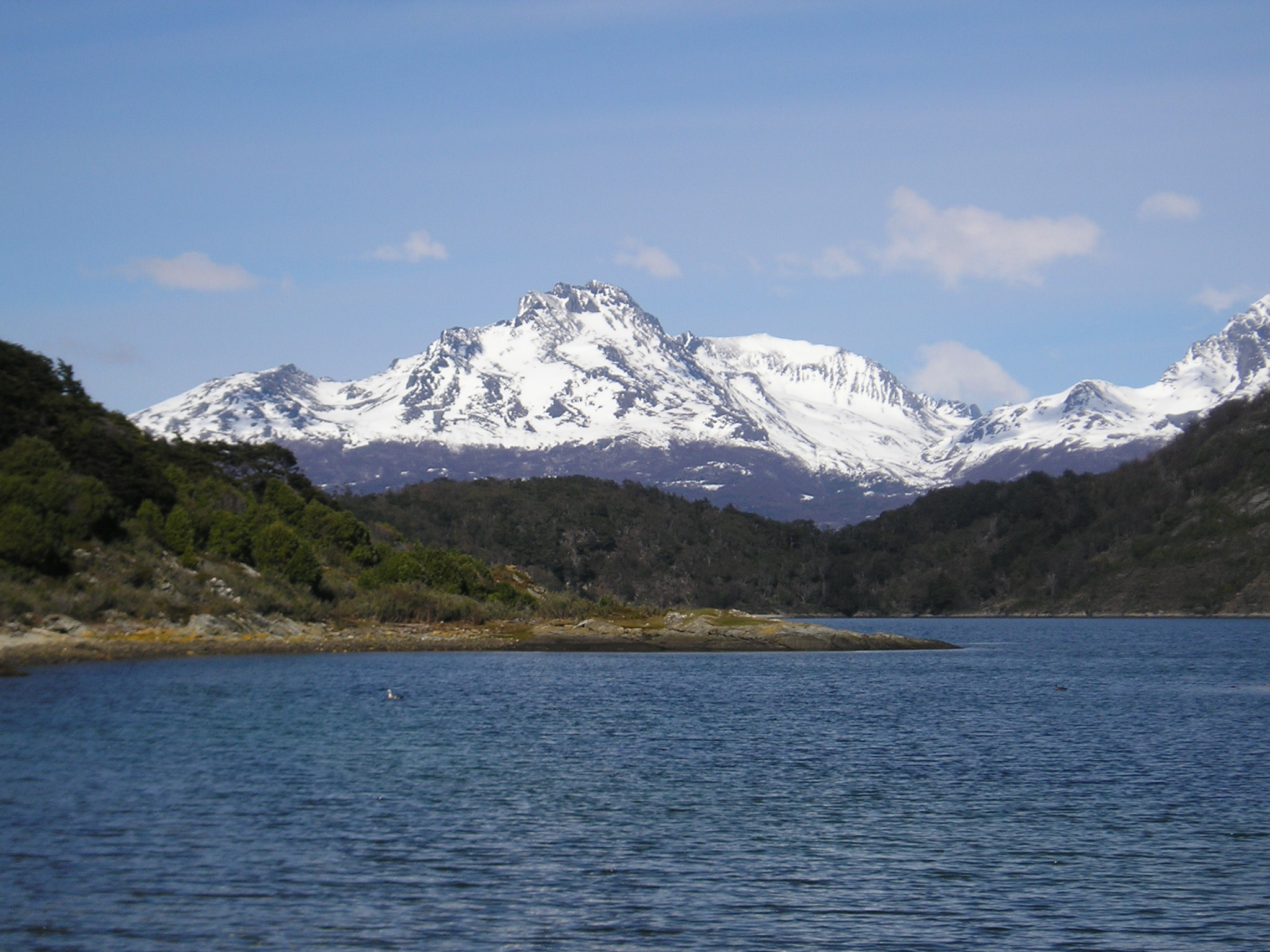
- View of the Tierra del Fuego National Park

- Flag Coat of arms

- Location of Tierra del Fuego, Antarctica and South Atlantic Islands Province within Argentina

- Location of Tierra del Fuego Province within Argentina (mainland portion and Falkland Islands only)
- Country: Argentina
- Capital: Ushuaia
- Departments: 5
- Local Governments: 3

Government
  - Governor: Gustavo Melella (FORJA)
  - Vice Governor: Mónica Urquiza (MOPOF)
  - Legislature: 15
  - National Deputies: 5
  - National Senators: Pablo Blanco (UCR); María Eugenia Duré (PJ); Cristina López (PJ)

Area Ranked 23rd (mainland)
  - Total: 21,263 km^{2} (8,210 sq mi)

Population (2022 census)
  - Total: 190,641
  - Rank: 24th
  - Density: 8.9659/km^{2} (23.221/sq mi)
- Demonym: fueguino

GDP
  - Total: US$ 2.5 billion
  - Per capita: US$ 13,800
- Time zone: UTC−3 (ART)
- ISO 3166 code: AR-V
- HDI (2021): 0.856 very high (4th)
- Website: tierradelfuego.gob.ar

Tierra del Fuego (Spanish: [ˈtjera ðel ˈfweɣo]; Spanish for 'Land of Fire'), officially the Province of Tierra del Fuego, Antarctica and South Atlantic Islands (Spanish: Provincia de Tierra del Fuego, Antártida e Islas del Atlántico Sur, the latter two abbreviated A.e.I.A.S.), is the southernmost and least populous Argentine province. The provincial capital city is Ushuaia.

== Extent ==
The Province of Tierra del Fuego, Antártida e Islas del Atlántico Sur, including all its territorial claims

The effective extent of the province is the eastern part of the island of Tierra del Fuego, Isla de los Estados and adjacent islands.

The province includes Argentina's claims to the Falkland Islands and South Georgia and the South Sandwich Islands (which are British Overseas Territories) and to a segment of Antarctica that overlaps with the British and Chilean claims on that continent. Argentina has no effective control in these territories beyond its own Antarctic bases.

== History ==
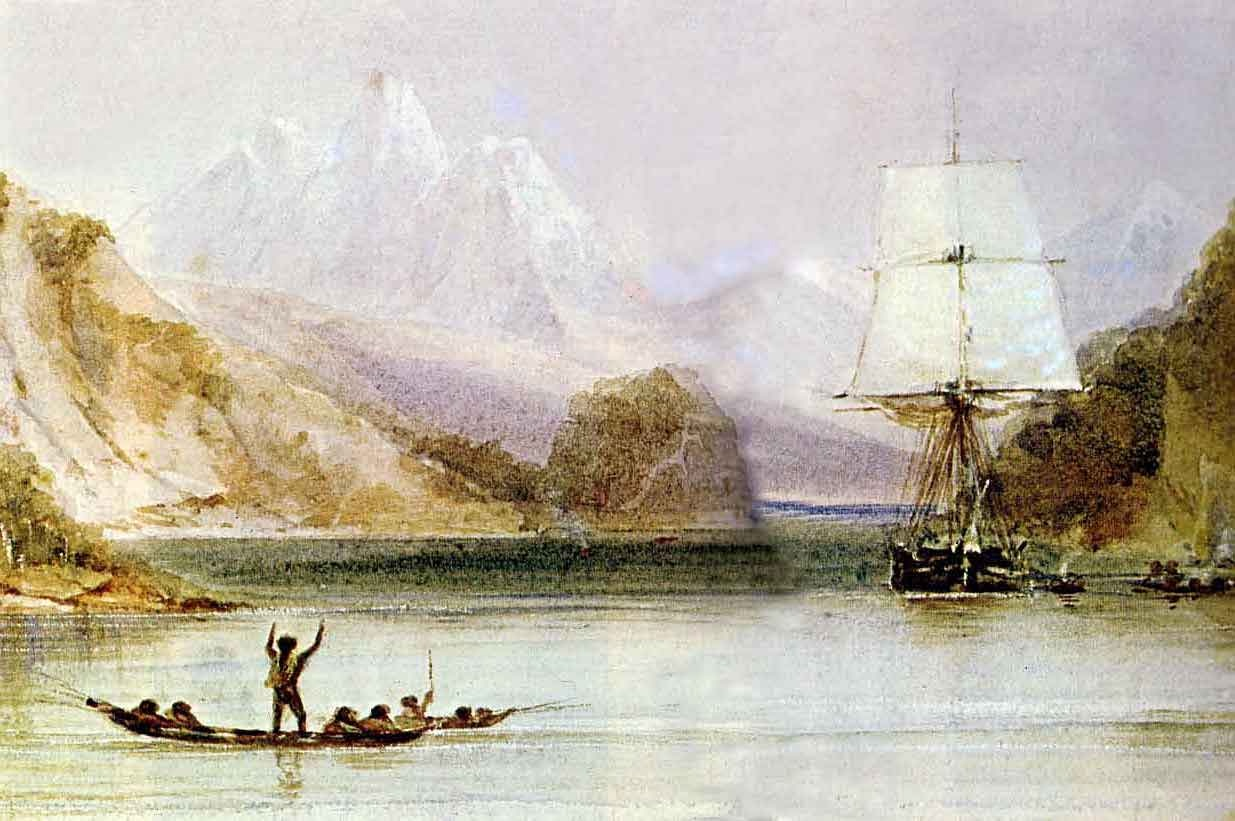
Period impression of HMS Beagle navigating along Tierra del Fuego, 1833

Tierra del Fuego was first settled by indigenous peoples around 12,000 years ago. When the first Europeans arrived, they encountered a population of about 10,000 indigenous people belonging to four tribes: Yámana, Alakaluf (now known by their autonym of Kawésqar), Selkʼnam (Ona) and Manekʼenk (Haush).

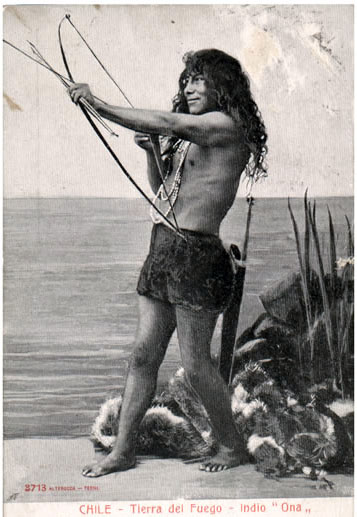
A member of the Selkʼnam people, 1904. The Selkʼnam, or Ona, who traditionally placed great value on amiability, were the island's most numerous native people until their numbers were reduced by disease and genocide in the 19th and 20th centuries

Luis Piedrabuena installed a base in San Juan de Salvamento on Isla de los Estados. The British South American Mission Society Patagonia Mission, under its superintendent Waite Stirling, founded Ushuaia as an Anglican mission in southern Tierra del Fuego in 1869.

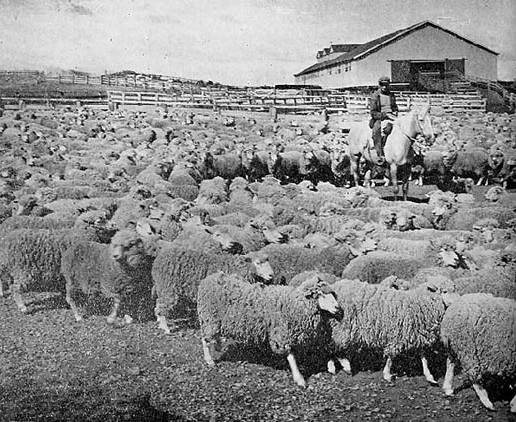
Local sheep ranch, 1942. Sheep, the most important part of the economy by the turn of the 20th century, have been eclipsed by the decline in the global wool market and the rise in petroleum extraction

The Amerindians suffered high fatalities from diseases (including measles and smallpox) and the outright warfare waged by ranchers and bounty hunters; by 1916 their population on the island had dropped to only 900. In addition, in the late 19th century, ranchers and settlers committed genocide against the Selkʼnam.

== Geography ==
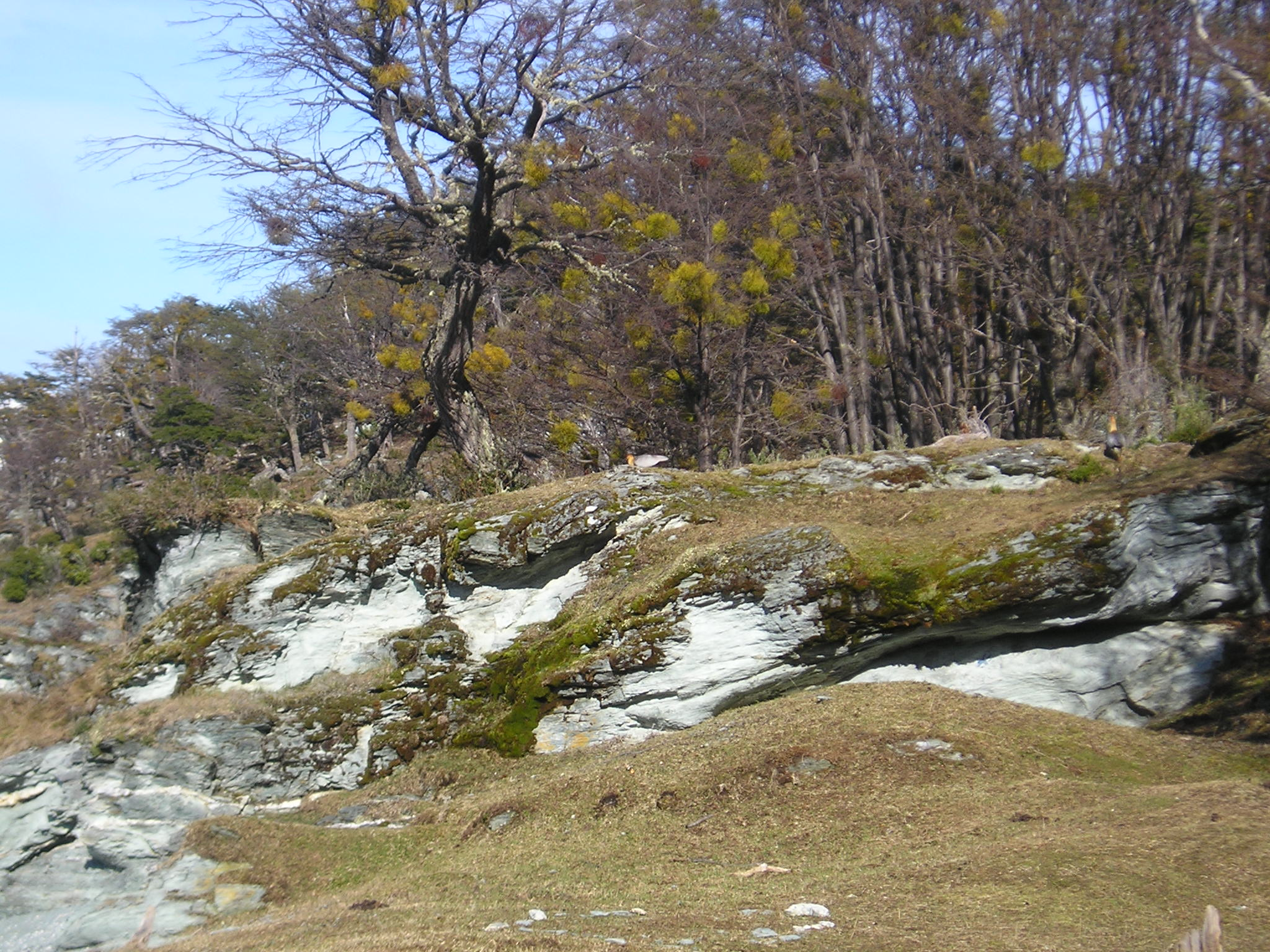
Mossy landscape, Tierra del Fuego

Due to its latitude, the island has a cold oceanic climate. The influences from the surrounding ocean and the predominant winds from the west result in the climate being uniform throughout the province. Mean annual temperatures are low, with winter temperatures averaging close to 0 °C (32 °F) and summer temperatures averaging around 10 °C (50 °F). Extreme temperatures range from 27 °C (81 °F) to −16 °C (3 °F) in the northeast and 29 °C (84 °F) to −21 °C (−6 °F) in the interior. The strong westerly winds from the Pacific Ocean decrease the perception of the temperature (wind chill). In the extreme south in the Beagle Channel which is surrounded by hills rising above 100 m (330 ft), winds can exceed 100 km/h (62 mph). The windiest months are from September to March. The island averages around 700 mm (28 in) of precipitation per year which is fairly evenly distributed throughout the year with a slight maximum in autumn. The lowest are in the extreme north where annual precipitation is around 280 mm (11 in) which increases to 550 mm (22 in) in the central parts of the Beagle Channel. Western parts of the province average around 2,000 mm (79 in) of precipitation a year. Snowfall is abundant throughout the island. Much of this island can be classified as within the Magellanic subpolar forests ecoregion.

== Demographics ==
Tierra del Fuego population pyramid 2022

According to the 2022 Argentine national census, the Province of Tierra del Fuego has 190,641 inhabitants. Per Argentine census data, the province's population has grown substantially in recent decades, with an average annual growth rate of 3.3% between 2010 and 2022.

== Government ==
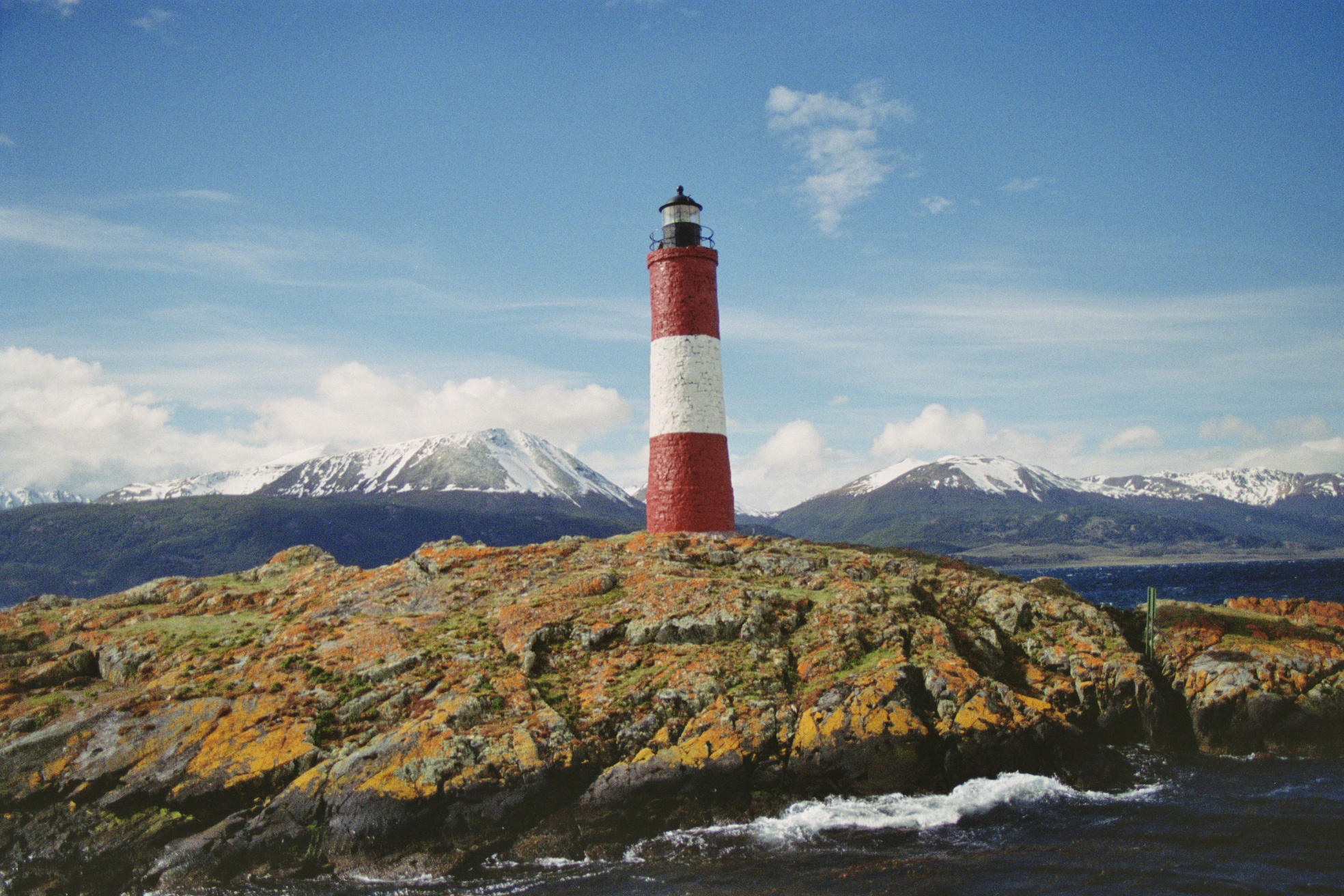
The Les Eclaireurs Lighthouse, on the Beagle Channel near Ushuaia

The provincial government is divided into three branches.

== Administrative divisions ==
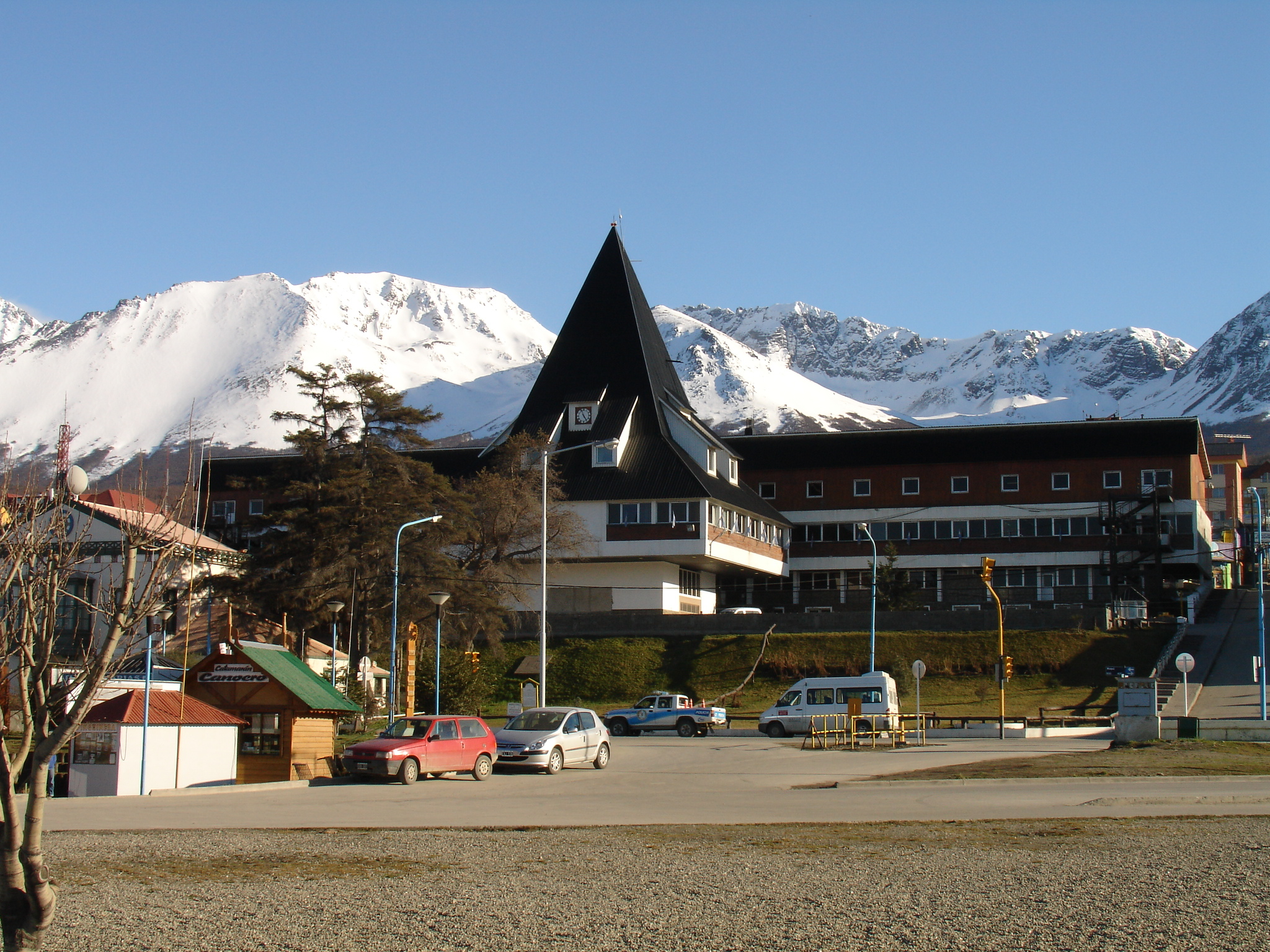
Governor's offices, Ushuaia

Decree 149/70 of 8 April 1970 divided the province into four departments: Ushuaia, Río Grande, Islas del Atlántico Sur, and Antártida. Law 1186, enacted on 13 November 2017, split Tolhuin from Río Grande.

The province is divided into five departments (Spanish: departamentos):

| Department | Capital |
|---|---|
| Antártida Argentina | (none) |
| Islas del Atlántico Sur | (disputed) |
| Río Grande | Río Grande |
| Tolhuin | Tolhuin |
| Ushuaia | Ushuaia |

== Economy ==
Tierra del Fuego has since the 1970s benefited from government subsidies to local industry and from its natural wealth. Its estimated 2006 output of US$2.6 billion gave the province a per capita income of US$25,719, the second highest in Argentina, behind Buenos Aires.

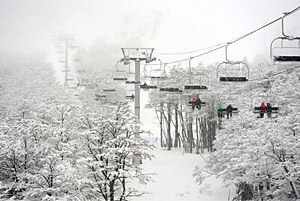
Cerro Castor is the most important ski resort in the province

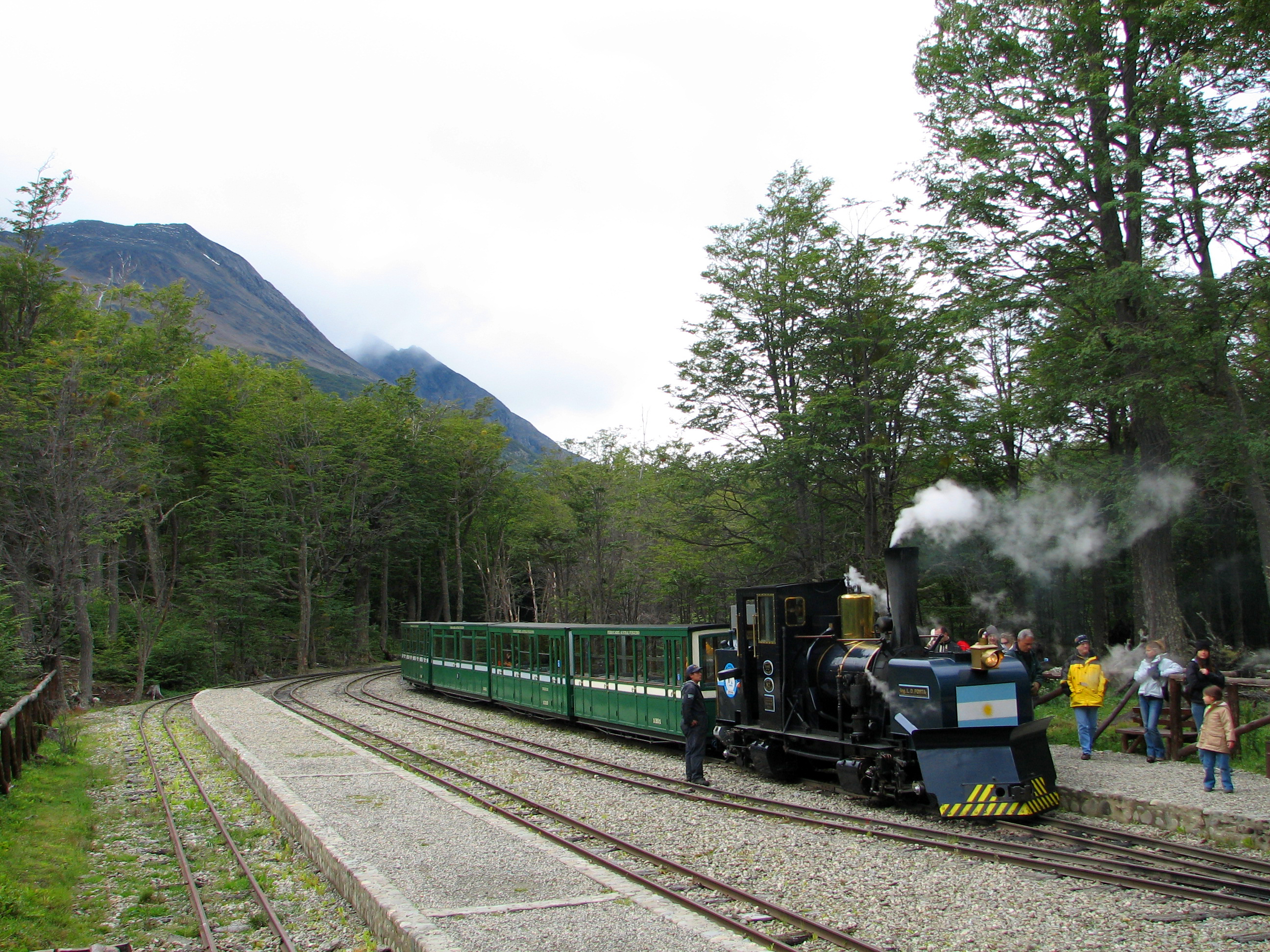
"Train to the End of the World". Operated by the provincial government, is the world's southernmost active railway

== Media ==
=== Newspapers ===
There are numerous main newspapers: El Diario del Fin del Mundo, El Sureño, Actualidad TDF, and El Diario La Prensa, as well as several other minor publications.

== See also ==
- 1949 Tierra del Fuego earthquakes
- Argentine Antarctica
- Isla Grande de Tierra del Fuego
- South Georgia and the South Sandwich Islands
- South Orkney Islands
- Tierra del Fuego Archipelago
