= White Paraguayans =

Paraguayans of European descent

Paraguayos blancos (Spanish)

Regions with significant populations
- (Asunción) Asunción; Ciudad del Este; Encarnación; San Bernardino; Altos

Languages
- Majority: Spanish: Minority: Italian; Portuguese; German; Arab; Polish; English; Guaraní

Religion
- Majority: Roman Catholicism: Minority: Anabaptism; Evangelicalism; Judaism

Related ethnic groups
- Spaniards; Italians; Germans; Lebanese; White Argentines; White Brazilians; Others

White Paraguayans (Spanish: Paraguayos blancos) are Paraguayans of total or predominantly European or Levantine ancestry, primarily Spanish and Italian, and to a lesser extent, German, Lebanese, Ukrainian, Polish and Brasiguayan.

Paraguayan people of European ancestry mostly descend from people who arrived over the centuries from Spain and Italy. The Paraguayan population is the result of a heterogeneous mixture: mestizos, Creoles, Spanish immigrants, Italians, Germans, indigenous people of Guarani descent and indigenous people from the Pampas, etc. After the War of the Triple Alliance (1864-1870), in which the original Paraguayan population was practically exterminated, the country was repopulated with the help of immigrants, mainly from European and neighboring countries.

European Paraguayans are an important ethnic group representing approximately 40% of the Paraguayan population (range of 30% - 55%). The vast majority of the remainder of the population is mestizo (having mixed European and indigenous ancestry, most of them of Guarani descent).

== History ==
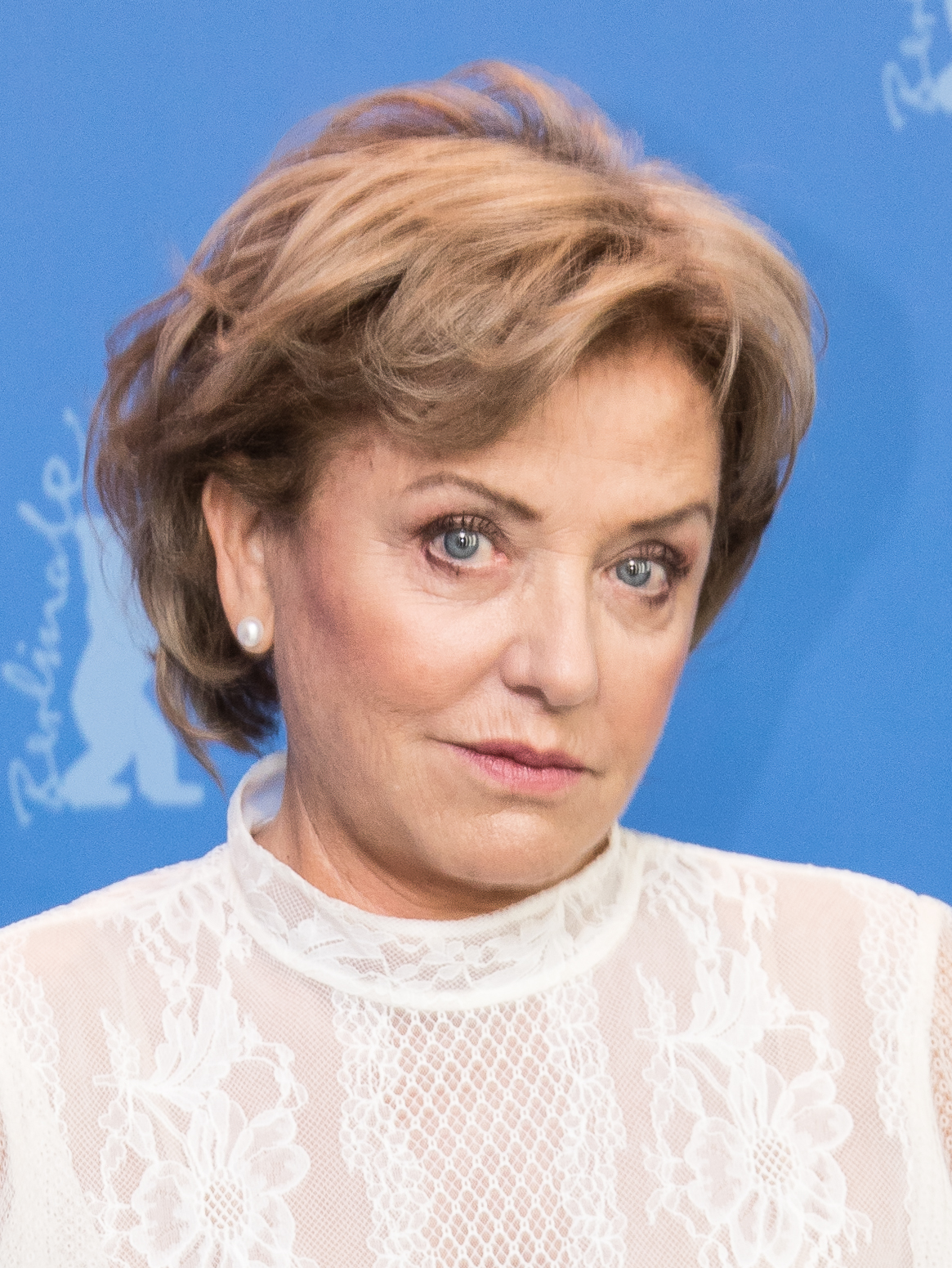
Ana Brun, prestigious and well known actress who was born in Asunción.

In the first phase, the Paraguayan population originated with the mass union of indigenous women - mainly those of Guaraní ethnicity - and the Spanish colonizers, who arrived in the 16th century: The Paraguayan people, originated in the crossbreeding of Guaraní and Spanish cultures, was governed for three hundred years under the dominion and colonial dependence of the Kingdom of Spain, with the Spaniards retaining all the rights and privileges that in most cases implied the exploitation of mestizos and natives.

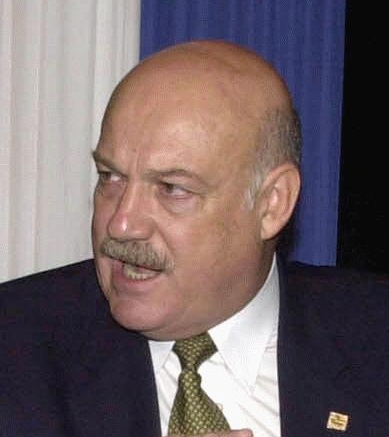
Luis Ángel González Macchi, former president and lawyer of Italian descent.

In a second phase, at the end of the War of the Triple Alliance - a dispute that took place between 1864 and 1870, having as protagonists the allies (Argentina, Brazil and Uruguay) against Paraguay - it is estimated that around 50% or more of the original Paraguayan population lost their lives. After this war, and during the course of the 20th century, European immigration (Germans, Spaniards, Italians, French, Russians, Belgians, etc.), added to the high birth rate of the population, contributed to the increase of the Paraguayan population, although in a more modest way compared to its neighboring countries. Recently, in the 1970s, with the construction of the Itaipu hydroelectric power plant, there was another "wave" of immigration, especially from Brazil (mostly of German descent), but also from Asia (Koreans, Taiwanese, Japanese), and from the Arab world (Syrian-Lebanese) to the country. Paraguay also had some Ukrainian immigration, although the Ukrainians who settled in Paraguay did so much later compared to those who decided to settle in Brazil, Argentina and Uruguay, whose settlements date back to the end of the 19th century. Polish immigrants arrived in Paraguay before and after World War II.

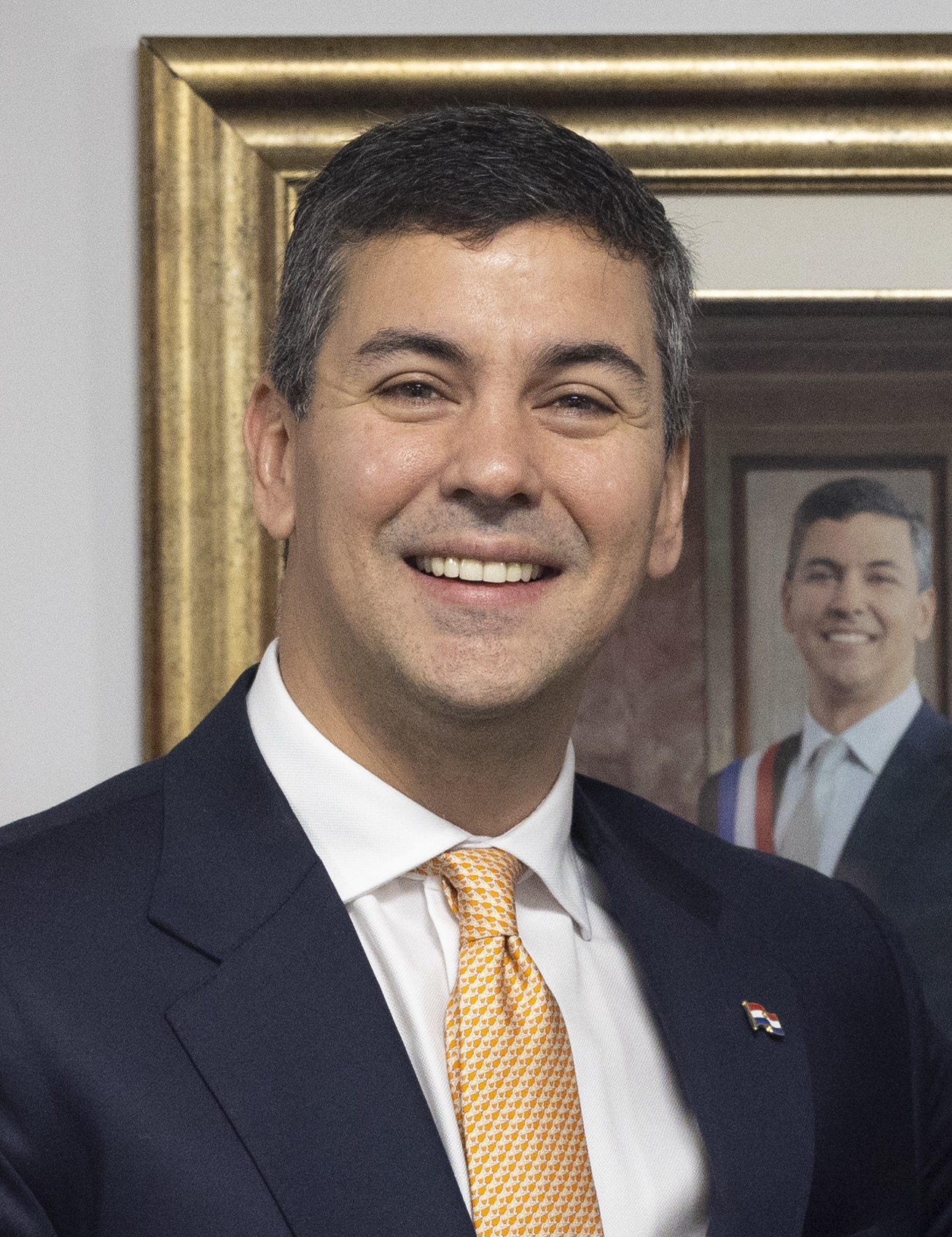
Santiago Peña, current president of Paraguay.

The Itapúa region on the border with Argentina received many Poles, Russians and Ukrainians. Many Poles came from Argentina and others came from Brazil.

Paraguay has a history of other settlement, especially in the 20th century: Germans (the majority are Mennonites) with long-time Paraguayan dictator Alfredo Stroessner (President, 1954-1989) himself of German ancestry; Italians (around 37% of the total Paraguayan population is of full or partial Italian descent); Japanese with Okinawans; Koreans; Chinese; Arabs; Poles; Southern Europeans; Jews; Brazilians; and Argentines are among those who have settled in Paraguay.

== Numbers ==
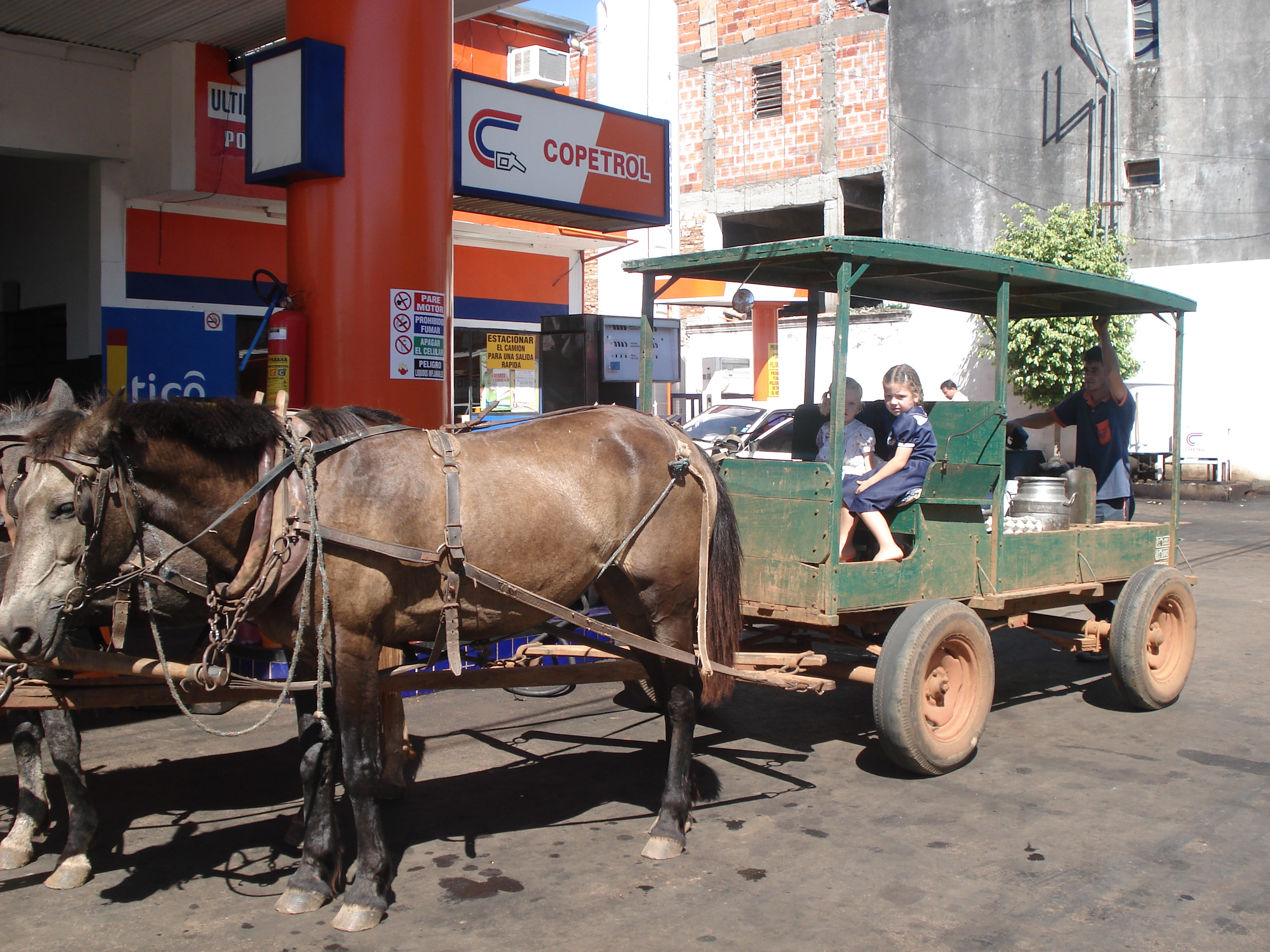
Mennonite children in San Juan Bautista, Misiones.

=== Census data ===
The General Directorate of Statistics, Surveys and Censuses (DGEEC), the institution in charge of censuses in Paraguay, does not include the concepts of race in its surveys and only registers those people who belong to one of the officially recognized indigenous peoples. According to the 2012 Census, Indigenous people totaled 112,848 people, corresponding to 1.68% of the country's total population.

== See also ==
- Paraguayans
- White Latin American
- History of Paraguay

=== Immigrant communities in Paraguay ===
- Spanish Paraguayans
- Italian Paraguayans
- Brasiguayos
- German Paraguayans (Mennonites)
- Lebanese Paraguayans
- Polish Paraguayan
- Ukrainian Paraguayans
- Australian Paraguayans
- English Paraguayans
- Hungarian Paraguayans
- Jewish Paraguayans
