= Argentina–Turkey relations =

- Argentina: Turkey

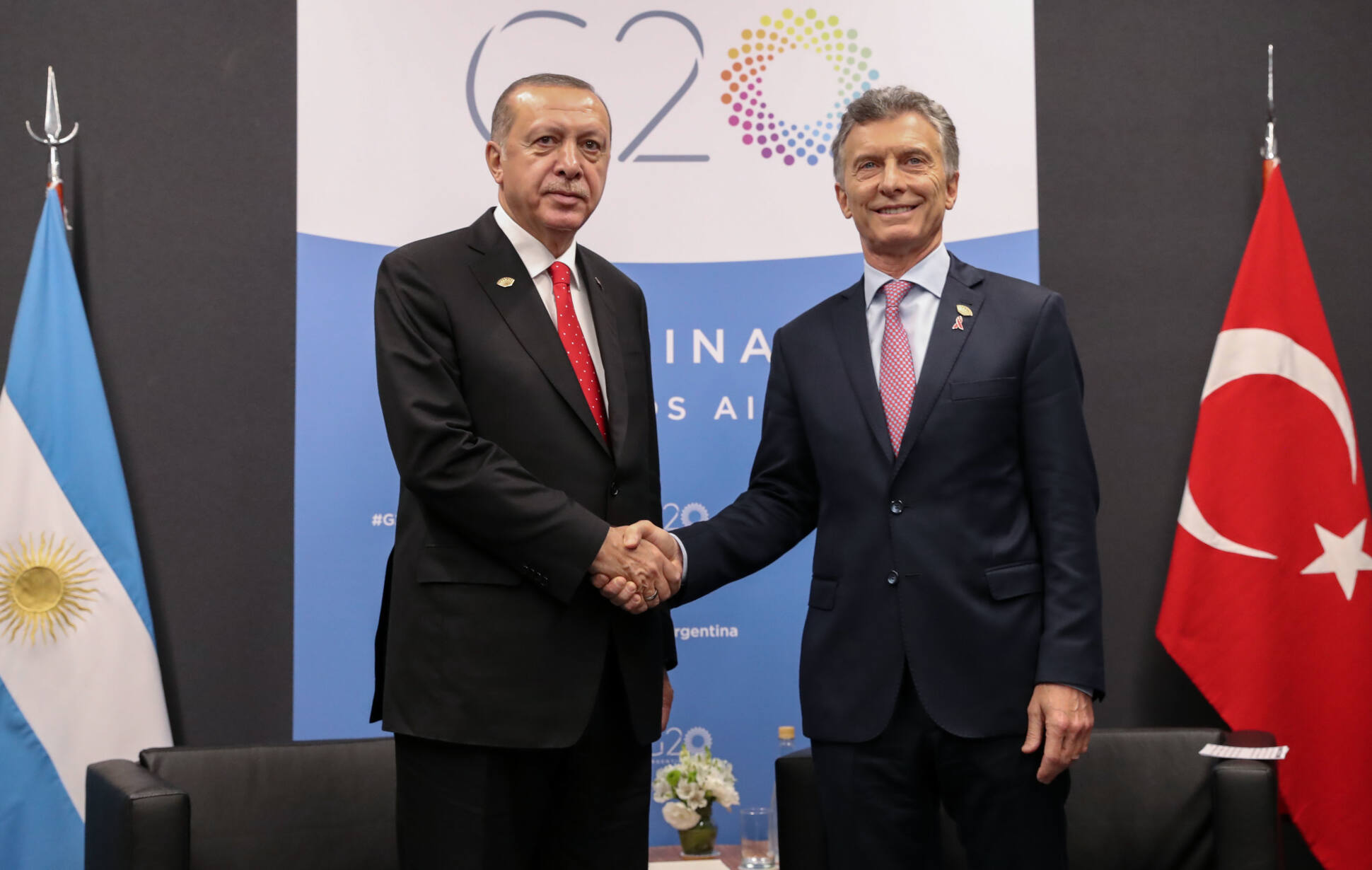
Turkish President Recep Tayyip Erdoğan and Argentine President Mauricio Macri, 2018

Foreign relations between Argentina and Turkey, have existed for over a century. Argentina has an embassy in Ankara and Turkey has an embassy in Buenos Aires. Turkey's staunch support for fellow NATO member United Kingdom during the Falklands War and the recognition of the Armenian genocide by the Argentine parliament have soured relations between the two countries.

== History and diplomatic incidents ==
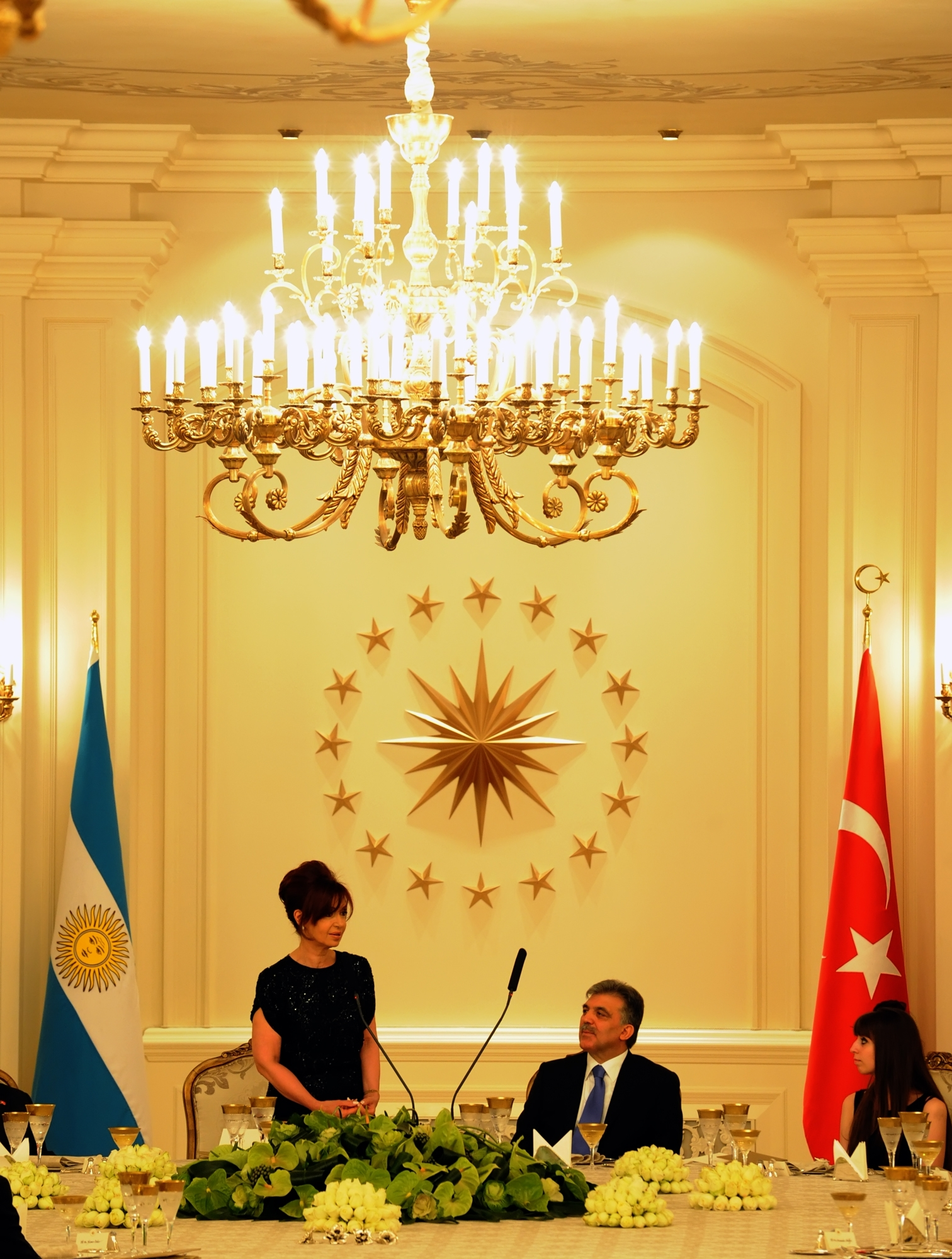
President Cristina Kirchner and President Abdullah Gül in Ankara, 2011.

The relations between Turkey and Argentina go back to the signing of the protocol of consular affairs between the Ottoman Empire and Argentina in 1910.

Following the promulgation of the Republic of Turkey, Friendship Agreement was signed in Rome in 1926.

In 1992, President of Argentina Carlos Menem visited Turkey. President of Turkey Süleyman Demirel visited Argentina in 1995. In 1998, İsmail Cem was the first Foreign Minister of Turkey who visited Argentina.

== Economic links ==
Turkey and Argentina have signed an Economic and Commercial Cooperation Agreement. The trade volume between the two countries was approximately US$455 million, with Turkey exporting US$161 million and importing US$294 million from Argentina by the end of 2019.

Flights from Istanbul to Buenos Aires via São Paulo commenced in December 2013 and are taking place on a daily basis.

In recent years, millions of dollars' worth of Turkish TV series have been exported to Argentina.

== Nuclear cooperation ==
On 3 May 1988, Argentina and Turkey signed a 15-year nuclear cooperation agreement, following Turkey's drive for nuclear fuel cycle independence. Argentina agreed to study the feasibility of building a 300 MWe PWR designed by Empresa Nuclear Argentina de Centrales. Other fuel cycle activities were also explored.

In October 1990, Turkish companies Sezai Turkes-Fevzi Akkaya and TEK formed a joint engineering agreement with Argentine agencies Comisión Nacional de Energía Atómica and Investigaciones Aplicadas to develop two CAREM-25 nuclear reactors, one in each country, with construction to begin in 1991 in Argentina and in 1992 in Turkey. Former Turkish Prime Minister Turgut Ozal and Argentine President Carlos Menem personally negotiated the deal. However, the arrangement was cancelled a year later due to international pressure because of proliferation concerns.

== Visits ==
Guest	Host	Place of visit	Date of visit
(Argentina) President Carlos Menem	(Turkey) President Turgut Özal	Çankaya Köşkü, Ankara	May 8-11, 1992
(Turkey) President Süleyman Demirel	(Argentina) President Carlos Menem	Casa Rosada, Buenos Aires	April, 1995
(Argentina) President Cristina Fernández de Kirchner	(Turkey) President Abdullah Gül	Ankara and Istanbul	January 20–21, 2011
(Turkey) President Recep Tayyip Erdoğan	(Argentina) President Mauricio Macri	2018 G20 Buenos Aires summit, Buenos Aires	November, 2018

== See also ==
- Foreign relations of Argentina
- Foreign relations of Turkey
- Turks in Argentina
