= Turkish Argentines =

Türk Arjantinliler (Turkish) Turco-Argentinos (Spanish)
- (Argentina) (Turkey)
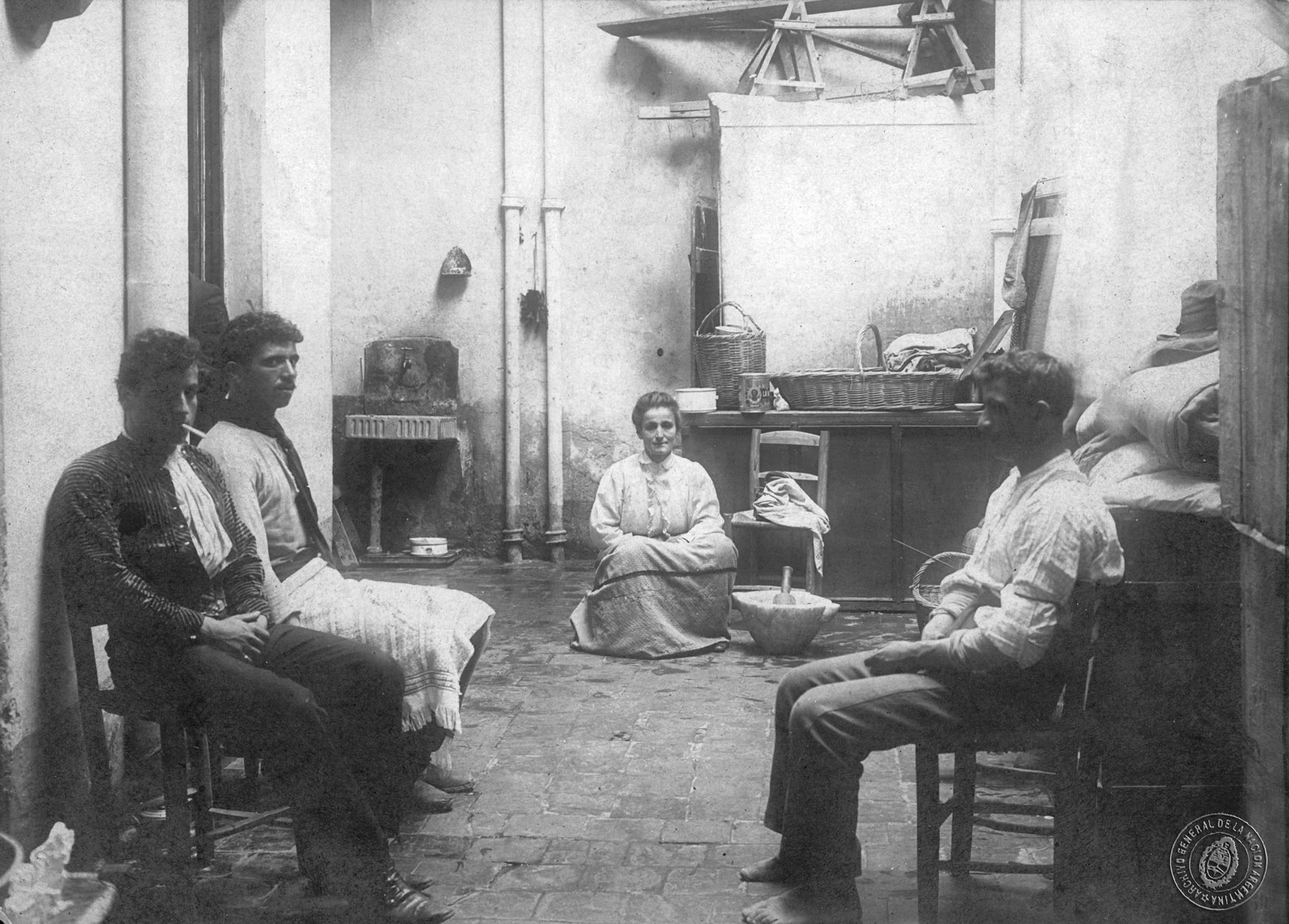
- Courtyard of a house of Ottoman immigrants, in the Tres Sargentos Passage, Buenos Aires, c. 1912.

Total population
- 635 (IOM)

Regions with significant populations
- Buenos Aires, Gualeguay and Gualeguaychú

Languages
- Spanish • Turkish

Religion
- Islam · Christianity · Judaism

Related ethnic groups
- Turks; Turkish Venezuelans; Turkish Americans; Turkish Mexicans; Turkish Canadians; Turkish Australians

Turkish Argentines are (Spanish: Turco-Argentions; Turkish: Türk Arjantinliler) Argentine citizens of full or partial Turkish ancestry. In 2015, The International Organization for Migration (IOM) estimated that there are 635 Turkish immigrants residing in Argentina.

== History and culture ==
The Turkish community is small and mainly descended from Turks who arrived during the Great Immigration in Argentina in the late 19th century and early 20th century from the then Ottoman Empire, mainly during World War I. Another second wave arrived during World War II. Some third generation descendants are fluent in Turkish. The community, which is very active, is usually seen at the Immigrant's Day celebration in Buenos Aires, thanks to an invitation from the National Migration Directorate.

Most of the immigrants arriving since the Ottoman Empire were Arabs (mainly Syrians and Lebanese), while another number were Sephardic Jews and Armenians. Despite this, the Arab-Argentines are mistakenly nicknamed Turks. An example of this is the nickname of the former president Carlos Saúl Menem. This is due to the arrival of immigrants they were noted as "Turkish-Ottomans", appearing in the same way in the first Argentine censuses. In 1914, the "Turkish-Ottomans" represented 1.9% of the foreign population, being the fifth largest immigration.

At the beginning of the 1900s, a Turkish-Ottoman neighborhood was developed in the Catalinas Norte area of the Buenos Aires neighborhood of Retiro, which stretched for 200 meters above the Reconquista Street. The sector concentrated most of the 8,000 Ottomans in Buenos Aires. Many of them were merchants and had their own newspapers.

== Notable people ==
- Can Armando Güner, football player

== See also ==
- Argentina–Turkey relations
- Turkish diaspora
- Ethnic groups of Argentina
- Asian Argentines
- European Argentines
