= Polish Paraguayan =

Poles in Paraguay Polonia w Paragwaju (Polish) Polacos en Paraguay (Spanish)

Total population
- 100,000

Regions with significant populations
- Itapúa Department; Asunción; Alto Paraná Department

Languages
- Spanish, Polish

Religion
- Christianity (mainly Roman Catholicism), Judaism, Islam (among Lipka Tatar descendants), Irreligion

Related ethnic groups
- Polish diaspora, Polish Argentines, Polish Brazilians, Polish Americans

A Polish Paraguayan is a Paraguayan-born person of full or partial Polish ancestry or a Polish-born citizen who resides in Paraguay. The peak of Polish immigration to Paraguay began during the 20th century, particularly after World War II when millions of Poles left their country and chose different countries where they could find a better quality of life. In South America, Paraguay was one of the main destinations.

== Polish immigration to Paraguay ==
Paraguay has historically been home to many immigrants from around the world, especially after the Paraguayan War, although not as much as its neighbours Argentina and Brazil. The first Poles arrived in Paraguay in before World War II. Itapúa Department, bordering Argentina, received large numbers of Polish, Russian, and Ukrainian immigrants. They established colonies such as Fram, north-west of the department capital of Encarnación.

From 1927 to 1938, there was an exodus from Poland to Paraguay of more than 10,000 people. About 12,000 Poles emigrated to Paraguay, of whom 60 over the same period returned to Poland. However, a new amount of 12,000 immigrants arrived although there were 2,200 Poles among them only; the rest were mostly Ukrainians (majority) and Belarusians.

Part of the Poles arrived in Paraguay came from the Polish colony of Brazil, who moved from the regions of Santa Catarina and Rio Grande do Sul to Paraguay or Argentina. Other Poles arrived from Argentina. In 1930 a large group of German Mennonites from Poland settled in the colony of Fernheim. It is estimated that in 1939 in Paraguay lived approx. 17,000 Poles and Polish citizens.

In the 1930s the Ministry of Foreign Affairs of Poland elaborated a plan of establishing a Polish colony in the triangle between Brazil, Paraguay and Argentina. The emigration to this area was officially supported, the government even bought some land in the region and initiated two Polish settlements. These ideas collapsed due to World War II.

== See also ==
- Immigration to Paraguay
- Polish diaspora
- Ukrainians in Paraguay
