= Ethnic groups of Argentina =

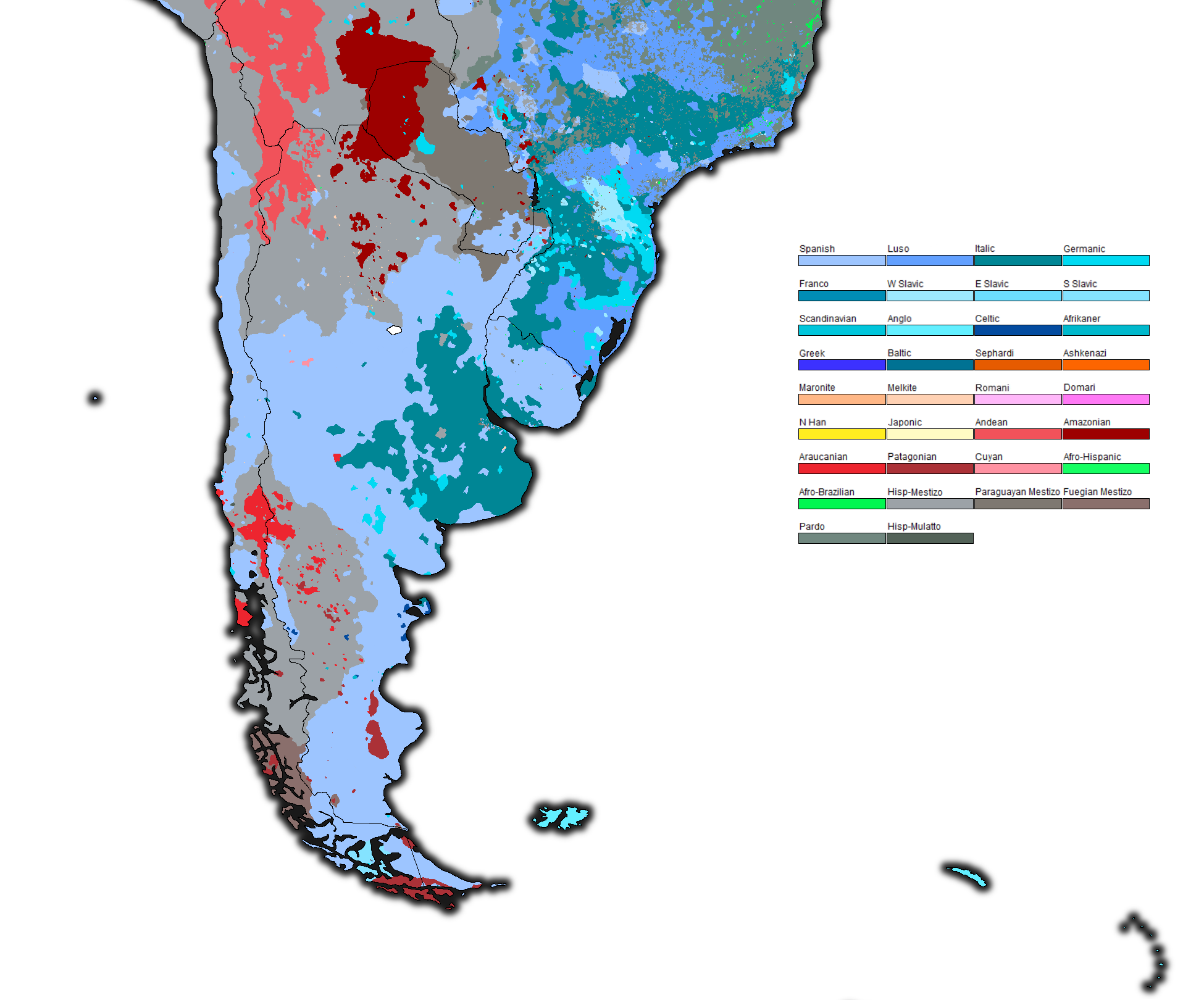
Ethnic map of Argentina and the rest of the Southern Cone.

Argentina has a racially and ethnically diverse population. The territory of what today is Argentina was first inhabited by numerous indigenous peoples. The first white settlers came during the period of Spanish colonization, beginning in the 16th century. The Spaniards imported African slaves, who would go on to become the first Afro-Argentines. Following independence from Spain in the 19th century and well into the 20th century, numerous migration waves took place, with Argentina being the second most popular destination for migrants in the early 20th century, after the United States. Most of these migrants came from Europe.

Most modern-day Argentines are descendants of these 19th and 20th century immigrants, with about 97% of the population being of full or partial European or Levantine ancestry, while an estimated 30% or 56% have some indigenous ancestry, and 5% or 9% have some African ancestry. In the 2010 census [INDEC], some 955,032 Argentines (2.38% of the population) identified as indigenous or first-generation descendants of indigenous peoples, while 149,493 (0.37% of the population) identified as Afro-Argentine.

In addition, Argentines of Arab (mostly Syrian and Lebanese) descent constitute a significant minority, and the Jewish population is the largest in all Latin America and the sixth largest in the world.

Indigenous peoples continue to have significant populations in the country's north-west (Atacama, Diaguita, Kolla, Lule, etc.); north-east (Guaraní, Mocoví, Toba, Wichí, etc.); and in the south or Patagonia (Pehuenche, Aónikenk, Gününa këna, etc.).

East Asian peoples have increasing minorities in some Buenos Aires neighborhoods and are expanding to other large Argentine cities. More recent migratory flows have come from other Latin American countries, with Paraguayans, Bolivians, Peruvians and Venezuelans making up the bulk of Argentina's modern-day immigrant communities.

== Ethnic groups ==
Ethno-racial groups in Argentina (2022 census)
1. Undeclared (White, Mixed or East Asian) (96.5%)
2. Native (2.80%)
3. Black (0.70%)

=== Europeans ===
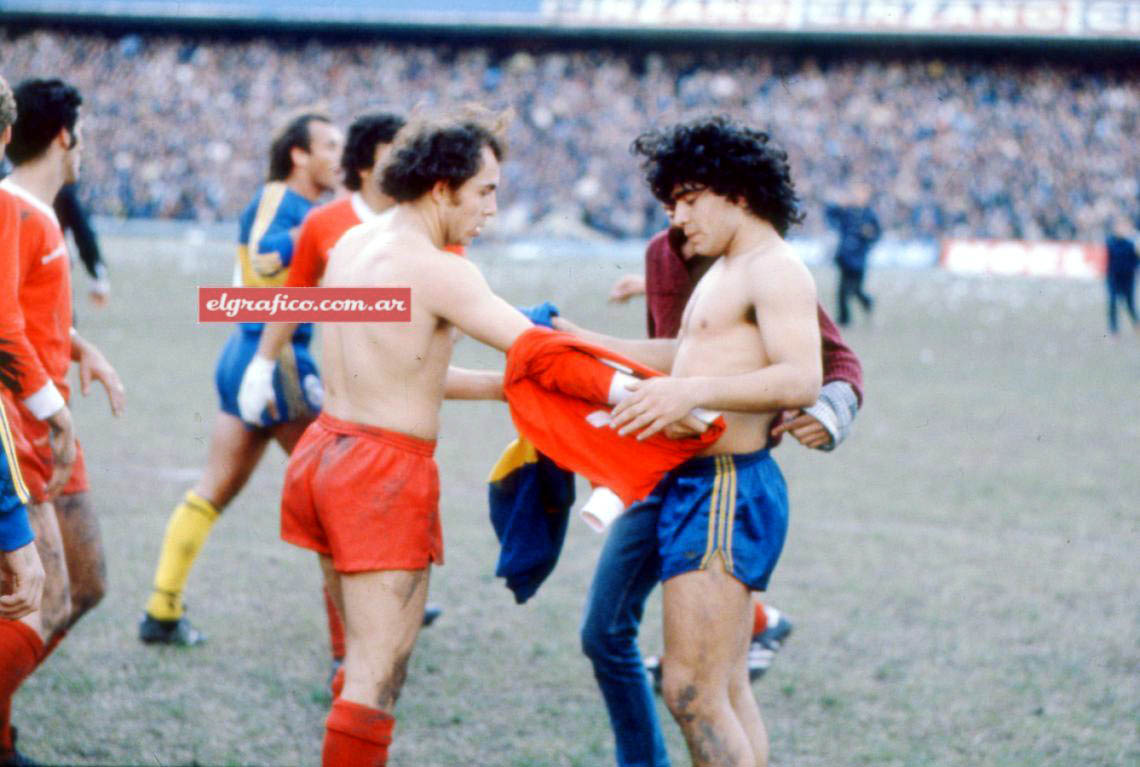
Ricardo Bochini, with an Italian surname, and Diego Maradona, with a Galician surname, exchanging jerseys.

Neither official census data nor statistically significant studies exist on the precise amount or percentage of Argentines of European descent today. The Argentine government recognizes the different communities, but Argentina's National Institute of Statistics and Censuses (INDEC) does not conduct ethnic/racial censuses, nor includes questions about ethnicity. The Census conducted on 27 October 2010, did include questions on Indigenous peoples (complementing the survey performed in 2005) and on Afro-descendants.

==== Arrival of the European immigrants ====
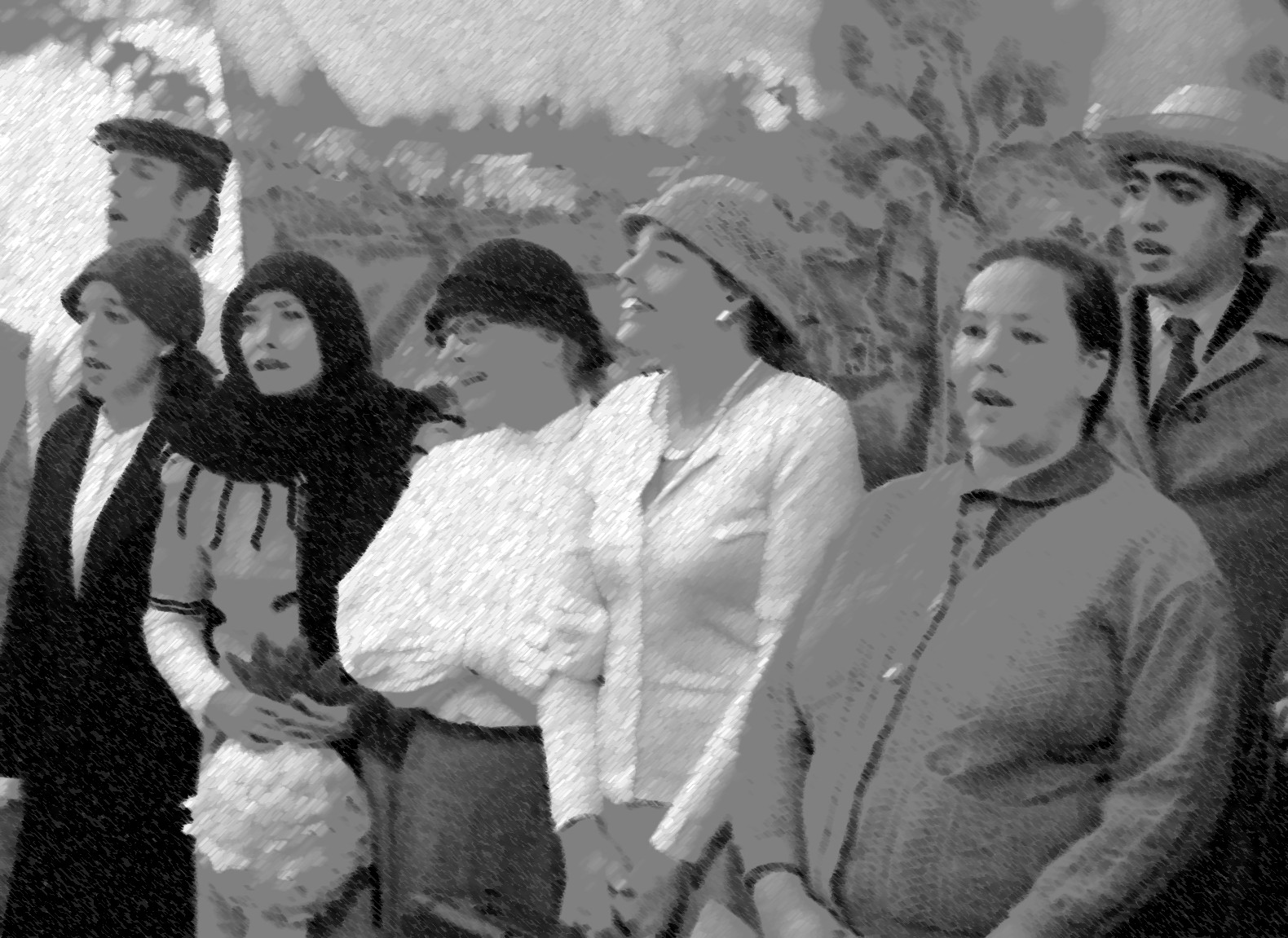
Re-enactment of the arrival of immigrants to the Port of Buenos Aires, XVII Immigrant National Festival, Oberá, Misiones.

The number and composition of the population was stable until 1853, when the national government, after passing a constitution, started a campaign to attract European immigration to populate the country. This state policy lasted several decades. At first the number of immigrants was modest compared to other countries such as the United States (though the number of immigrants was steadily increasing as they moved to the rural areas to settle and to found colonias like those of Italian, German, Swiss, or French origin), but in the 1870s, due to the economic crisis in Europe, it started to increase, reaching an extremely high rate between 1890 and 1930. Unofficial records show that, during the 1860s, 160,000 immigrants arrived in Argentina, while in the 1880s the net number increased to 841,000, almost doubling the population of the country in that decade.

Between 1857 and 1950, 6,611,000 European immigrants arrived in Argentina, making it the country with the second biggest immigration wave in the world, only second to the United States with 27 million, and ahead of such other areas of new settlement such as Canada, Brazil, Australia, New Zealand, Costa Rica, Colombia, Venezuela, Mexico and Uruguay and permanently changing the ethnography of Argentina.

Immigrants arrived through the port of Buenos Aires and many stayed in the capital or within Buenos Aires Province and this still happens today. In 1895, immigrants accounted for 52% of the population in the capital, and 31% in the province of Buenos Aires (some provinces of the littoral, such as Santa Fe, had about 40%, and the Patagonian provinces had about 50%).

Waves of immigrants from European countries arrived in the late 19th and early 20th centuries. Over 30 percent of the country's population was born overseas by 1914, and half of the population in Buenos Aires and Rosario was foreign-born. Over 80% of the Argentine population, per the 1914 Census, were immigrants, their children or grandchildren.

The Hotel de Inmigrantes, built in 1906 to accommodate the 100,000 to 200,000 yearly arrivals at the Port of Buenos Aires, was made a National Historic Monument.

==== Spaniards ====
Argentine elites diminished the Spanish culture from their culture in the newly independent country and created Argentine culture.

Between 1857 and 1940 more than 2 million Spanish people emigrated to Argentina, mostly from Galicia, Basque Country, Asturias, Cantabria in northern Spain, Catalonia in northeast Spain, and also from Andalusia in southern Spain.

==== Italians ====
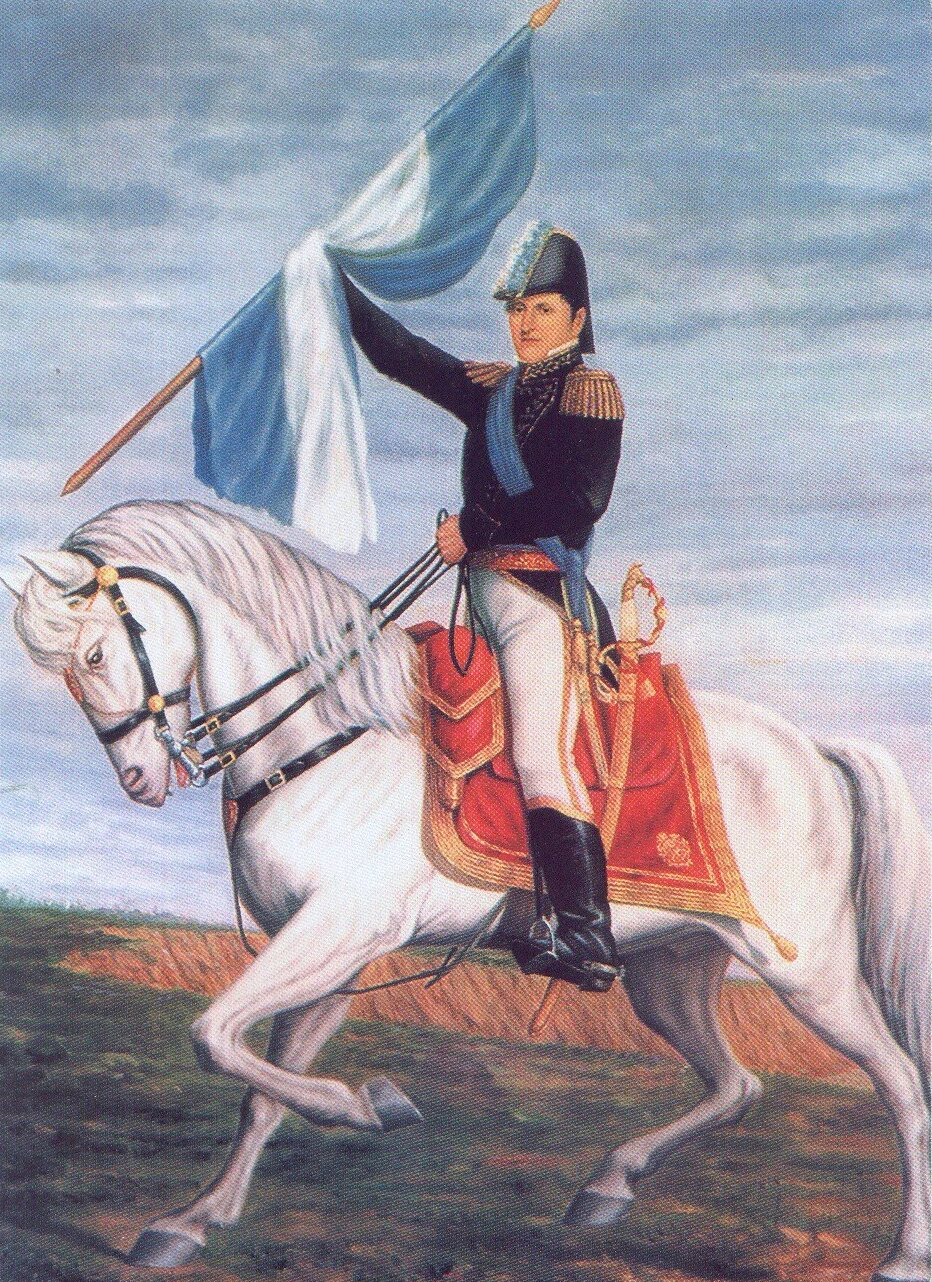
Manuel Belgrano, a lawyer and the creator of the Argentine flag was the son of an Italian.

Italian immigration to Argentina began in the 19th century, just after Argentina won its independence from Spain. Argentine culture has significant connections to Italian culture, in terms of language, customs and traditions.

Italians became firmly established throughout Argentina, with the greatest concentrations in the city of Buenos Aires, Buenos Aires Province, Santa Fe Province, Entre Ríos Province, Córdoba Province, Tucumán Province, La Pampa Province, and the nearby country of Uruguay.

There are many reasons for the Italian immigration to Argentina: Italy was enduring economic problems caused mainly by the unification of the Italian states into one nation. The country was impoverished, unemployment was rampant, certain areas were overpopulated, and Italy was subject to significant political turmoil. Italians saw in Argentina a chance to build for themselves a brand new life.

The Italian population in Argentina is the third largest in the world, and the second largest (after Brazil) outside of Italy, More than 20 million people (47% of Argentina's population according to Argentine government websites). Italians form a majority of the population of Argentina and neighboring Uruguay: up to two-thirds have some Italian background. Among Latin American countries, only Brazil has more people of Italian descent (28 million, approximately 15 percent of Brazil's total population).

==== Basques ====
It is estimated that there are currently between 3,000,000 and 3,500,000 Argentines of Basque descent. This people, originating from the Basque Country, maintained a significant presence from the colonial era onwards and later played a prominent role in the great wave of European immigration to Argentina, arriving from both Spain and France.

==== Croats ====
Croats number of 350,000 in Argentina, settling primarily in Buenos Aires, Santa Fe, Chaco, and Patagonia. At the turn of the 19th-20th centuries, there were over 133 settlements. Many Croatian Argentines can trace their ancestry to Dalmatia and the Croatian Littoral. Many Croats came after Nikola Mihanovich developed the merchant marine.

==== Germans ====
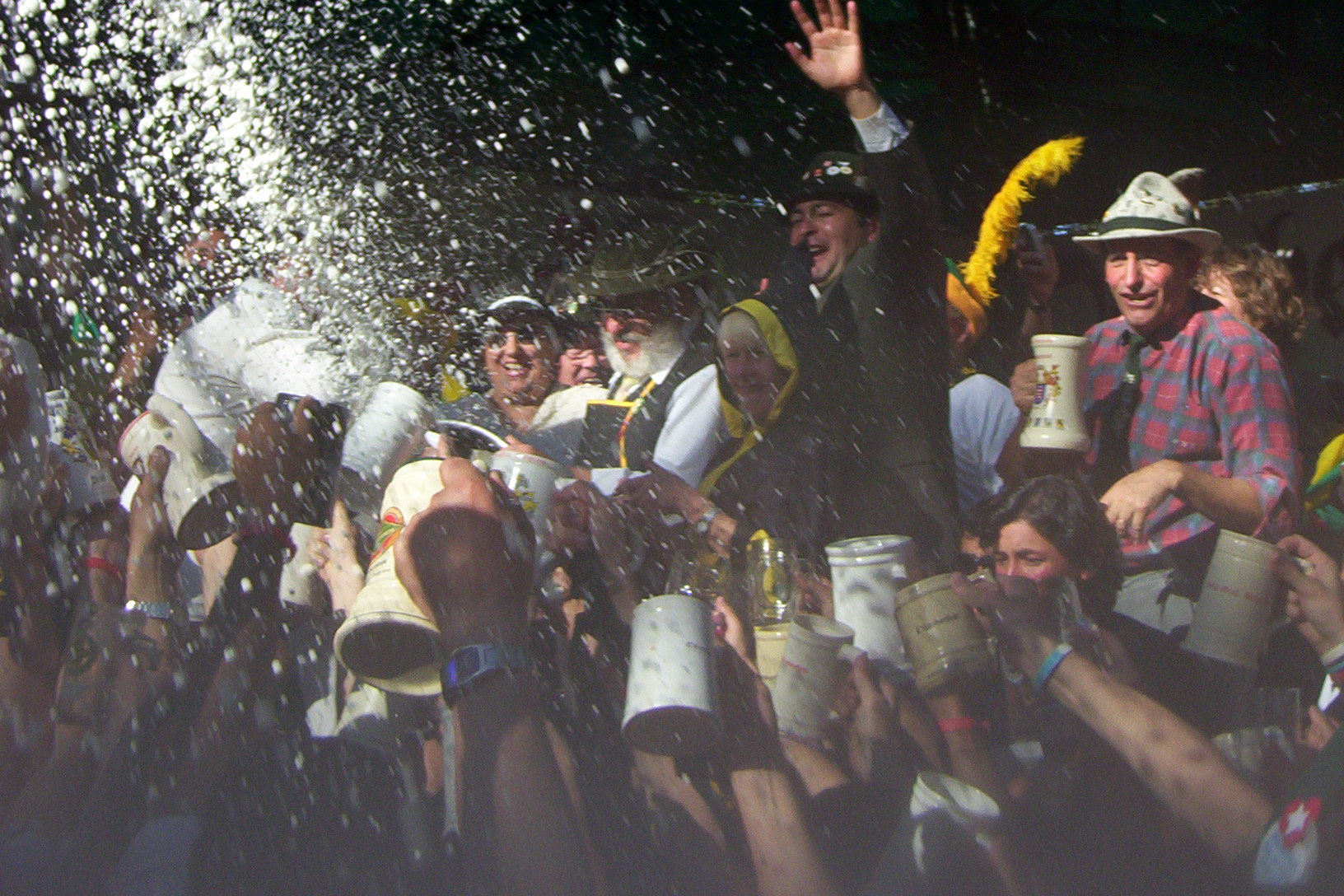
Oktoberfest in Villa General Belgrano, Córdoba.

German immigration to Argentina occurred during five main time periods: pre–1870, 1870–1914, 1918–1933, 1933–1940 and post–1945.

Argentina and Germany have long had close ties to each other. A flourishing trade developed between them as early as the German Unification, and Germany had a privileged position in the Argentine economy. Later, Argentina maintained a strong economic relationship with both Germany and Great Britain and supported them with supplies during World War I.

There are around 50,000 German descendants living in Buenos Aires. After the United States and Brazil, Argentina is among the nations with the largest number of German descendants in the world, together with Australia, Canada, South Africa and France. They arrived in the 19th century and then before and after World War II. Their arrival continued over an extended period, from the middle to end of the 19th century, until 1960 of the 20th century. Germans, Swiss, Belgian, Luxembourg and French people founded the Colony of Esperanza, establishing the first agricultural colony and then founding others.

The influence of their culture has also impacted Argentine cuisine; this trend is especially apparent in the field of desserts. The pastries known as facturas are Germanic in origin: croissants, known as medialunas ("half-moons", from German "Halbmond"), are the most popular of these, and can be found in two varieties: butter- and lard-based. Also German in origin are the "Berliner" known as bolas de Fraile ("friar's balls"), and the rolls called piononos.

The facturas were re-christened with local names given the difficult phonology of German, and usually Argentinized by the addition of a dulce de leche filling. That was also the case with the "Kreppel", called torta fritas in Argentina, which were introduced by German immigrants, and similarly with the "Achtzig Schlag" cake, translated as torta ochenta golpes. In addition, dishes like chucrut (sauerkraut) and many different kinds of sausage like bratwurst have made it into mainstream Argentine cuisine.

More than 7% of Argentines are of German descent. Over 2 million ethnic Germans in Argentina are of Volga German descent.

==== French ====
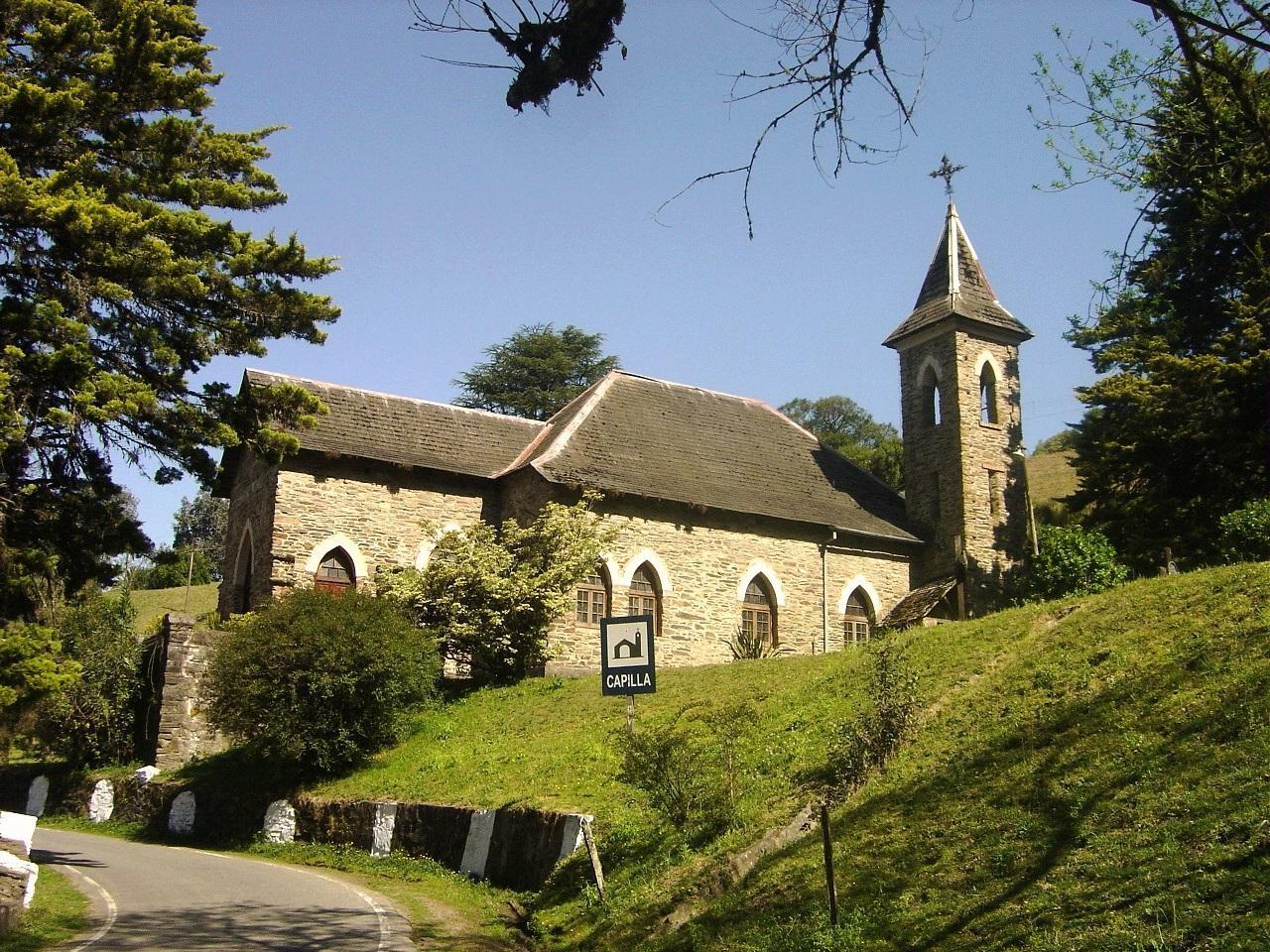
A chapel in Villa Nougués, Tucumán.

French immigration has left a significant mark on Argentina, with a notable influence on the arts, culture, science and society of the country. Many emblematic buildings in cities like Buenos Aires, Rosario, and Córdoba were built following French Beaux Arts and neoclassical styles, such as the Argentine National Congress, the Metropolitan Cathedral, or the Central Bank building. In particular, landscape architect Carlos Thays, in his position as 1891 Director of Parks and Walkways, is largely responsible for planting thousands of trees, creating the Buenos Aires Botanical Garden and giving the city many of its parks and plazas that are sometimes compared to similar designs in Paris.

While Argentines of French descent make up a substantial percent of the Argentine population, they are less visible than other similarly sized ethnic groups. This is due to the high degree of assimilation and the lack of substantial French colonies throughout the country.

==== Scandinavians ====
Scandinavians arrived in Argentina around 1909. The first ones settled in the northeastern area and founded a city called Villa Svea (now called Oberá). It was composed of Swedes, Norwegians and Finns. Russians, Germans, English and Danish joined them before and after World War I and spread throughout the country.

==== Austrians ====
Austrians settled throughout the country in the late 19th century.

==== Swiss ====
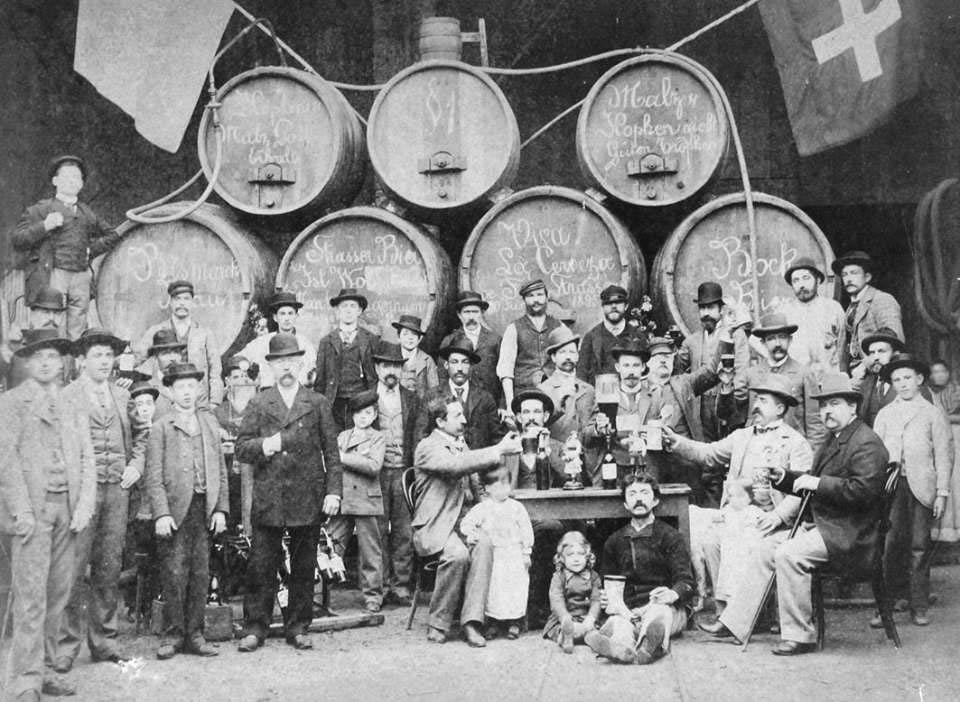
Friedrich Strasser and his Swiss employees at the Strasser Brewery in Rosario, Santa Fe in 1885.

Approximately 44,000 Swiss emigrated to Argentina until 1940, and settled mainly in the provinces of Córdoba and Santa Fe and, to a lesser extent, in Buenos Aires.

==== British ====
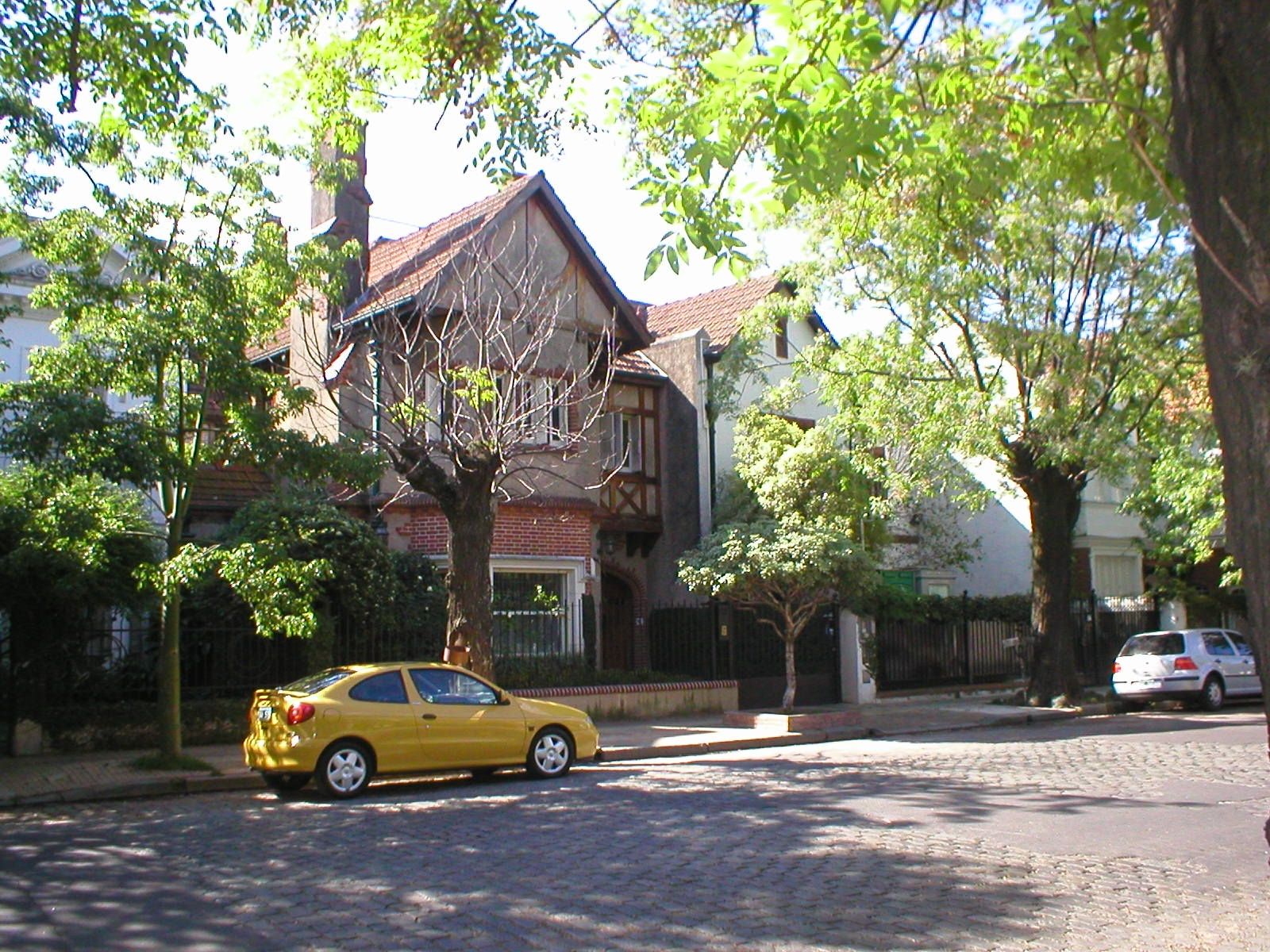
English-style Belgrano R.

Around 100,000 British immigrants arrived between 1857 and 1940. The British community founded solid institutions like the British Hospital in Buenos Aires, the Herald newspaper, prestigious bilingual schools and clubs as the Lawn Tennis Club and Hurlingham Club. British immigrants had a strong impact on the taste of Argentine sports through the development of football, polo, hockey, and rugby, among others.

Today, there are over 350,000 Argentines with ancestry from the British Isles.

==== Greeks ====
There are about 100,000 Argentines of Greek descent. The first immigrants arrived at the end of the 18th century, while the bulk of immigration occurred during the first half of the 20th century. Many were Aromanians and Megleno-Romanians immigrating from Greece, who became adjusted to Argentine society because of the linguistic similarities between Eastern Romance and Spanish, as well as the Latin identity of Aromanians and Megleno-Romanians.

==== Albanians ====
During the great immigration from Italians towards Argentina, there were also a lot of Arbereshe people. They became part of the great European immigration towards South America in the 19th century. Most Albanians who migrated to Argentina were Arbëreshë from Southern Italy.

==== Bulgarians ====
Bulgarian immigration in Argentina began intensively in the 1920s and had a second boom period between 1937 and 1938. Most of them were farmers from the northern regions of Bulgaria. Most settled in the province of Chaco.

==== Serbs ====
Serbs began to settle in Argentina in mid-19th century. Nowadays, community is mostly consisted of people with partial or distant Serb ancestry, i.e. third- or fourth-generation of immigrants.

==== Czechs ====
The Czechs were also part of the great immigration of the early 20th century. Most of their descendants live in the provinces of Chaco and Mendoza, in the country.

==== Irish ====
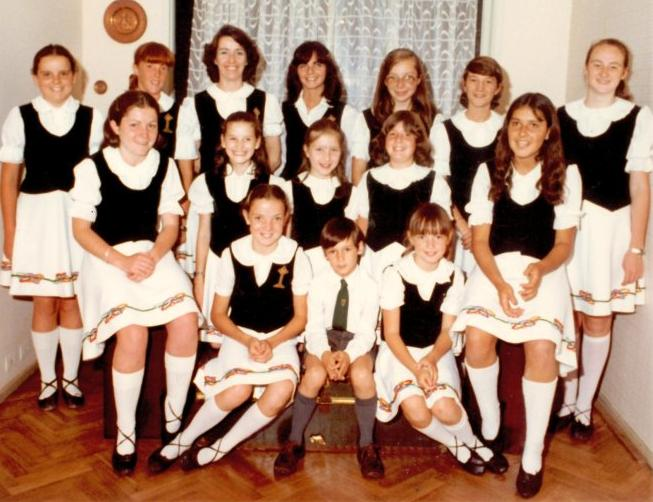
Students from an Irish dance school in Argentina in 1982.

The Irish emigrated to Argentina in the 19th century, between 1830 and 1875. They extended throughout the country, especially in the provinces of Santa Fe, Entre Rios and Córdoba. The modern Irish-Argentine community is estimated to be between 500,000 and 1,000,000. Argentina is the home of the fifth largest Irish community in the world.

==== Lithuanians ====
after the First World War, between 1925 and 1930, and settled mainly in Buenos Aires, Berisso and Rosario.

==== Luxembourgers ====
From 1888 to 1890, the Grand Duchy of Luxembourg was literally overwhelmed by a transatlantic migration wave, the so-called "Argentinienfieber", literally 'Argentine fever'. In less than two years, more than one thousand Luxembourgers - representing 0.5 per cent of the entire population - decided to emigrate to Argentina.

==== Dutch ====
The first organized immigration from the Netherlands occurred in 1889, when immigrants came from the area of Friesland. A second immigration took place around 1924. Most of them settled in Mar del Plata, Bahía Blanca, Comodoro Rivadavia, and Chubut.

==== Polish ====
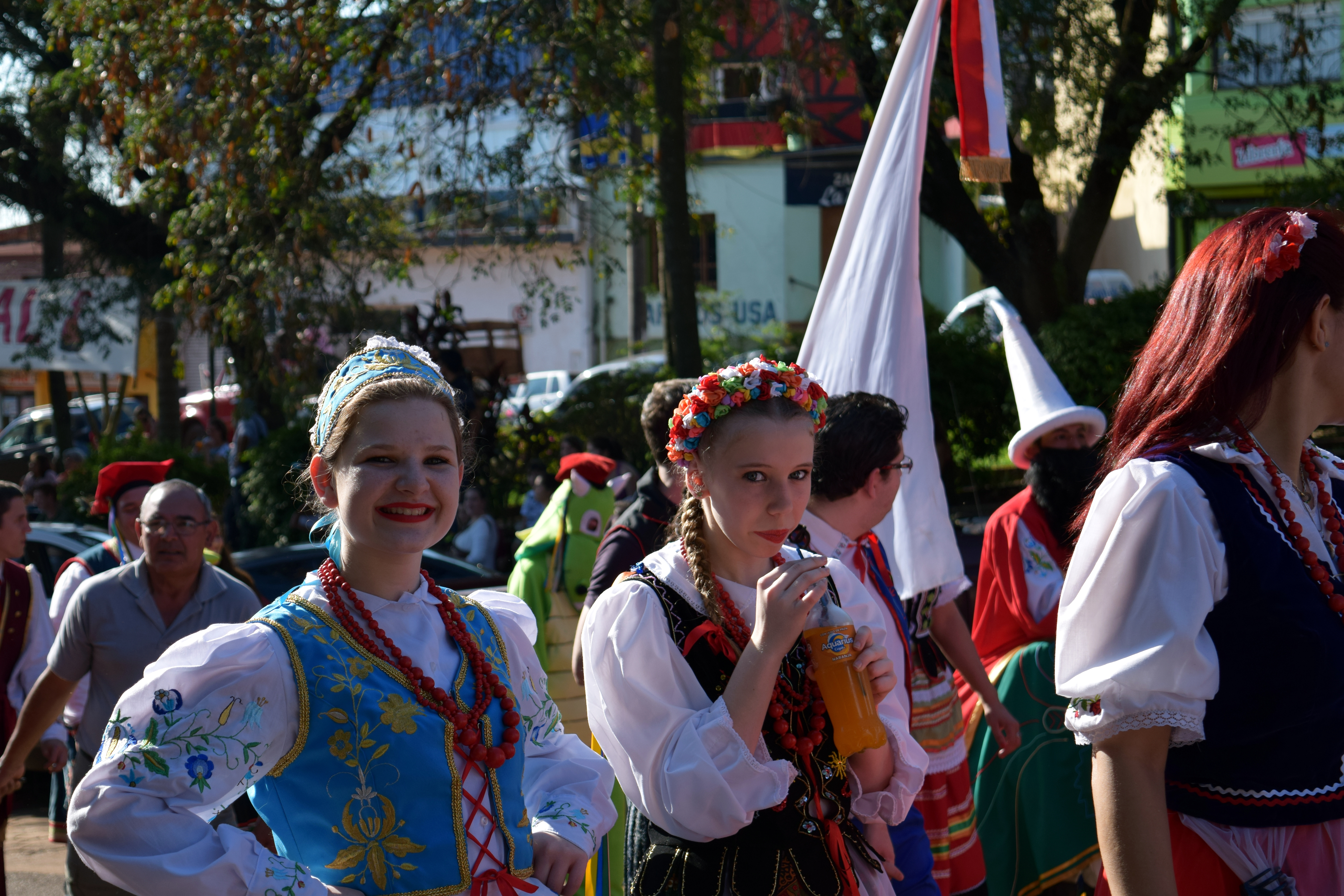
Argentine women of Polish descent in Oberá, Misiones.

Polish immigration began in 1897 and had a decisive influence in the Argentine population. Between the two world wars (1918–1939), large numbers of Poles emigrated. They mostly settled in Llavallol, San Justo, Valentín Alsina, San Martin, and Quilmes. Between 1946 and 1950, around 100,000 Poles settled in the country.

==== Russians ====
There is a significant number of Russians in Argentina. Most reside in Buenos Aires and northeastern areas. The majority of them arrived between 1880 and 1921. Another small wave arrived in the country in early 1990. As of July 2023, more than 18,500 Russians have come to Argentina after the Russian invasion of Ukraine in 2022.

==== Ukrainians ====
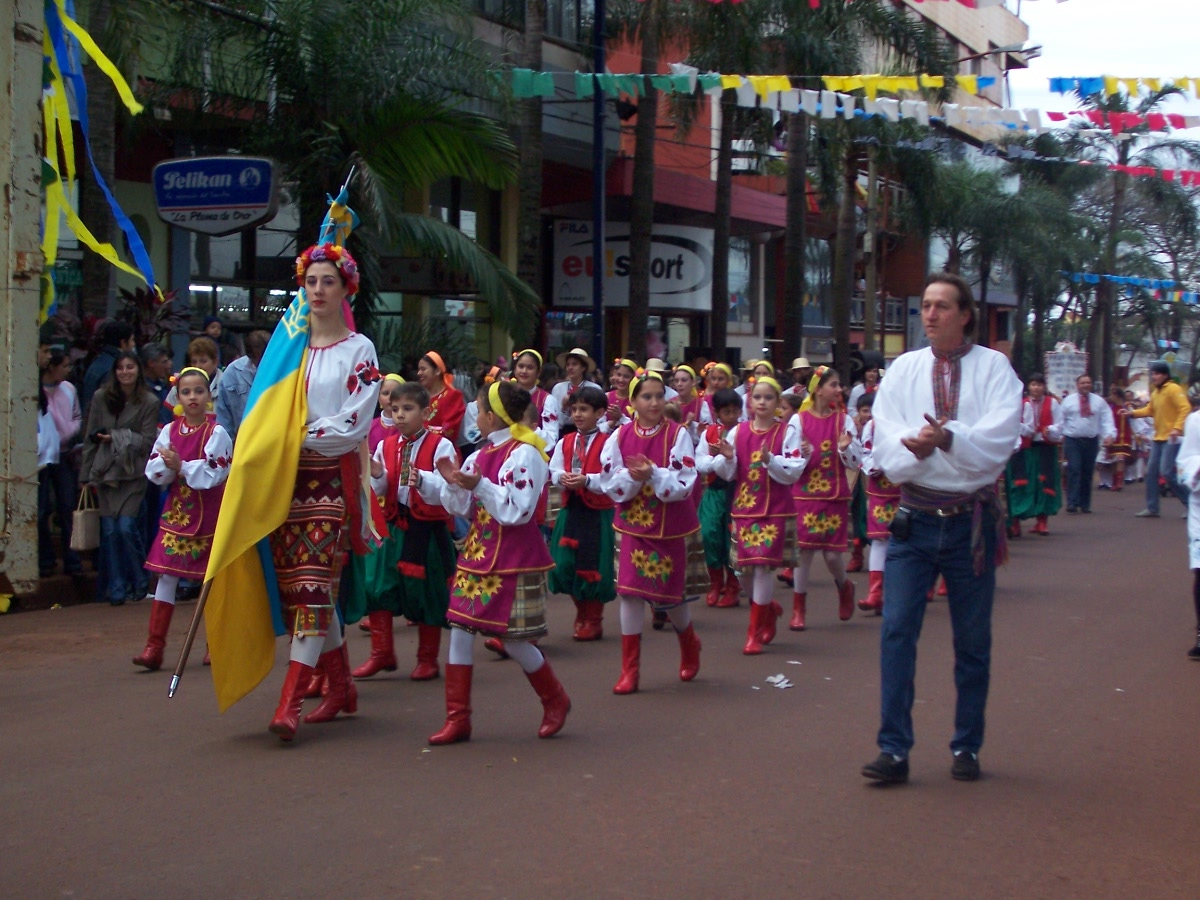
Ukrainian Argentines on parade in Misiones Province.

Ukrainian regular immigration to Argentina began in the 19th century. The first Ukrainian settlement in the country was in 1897. Subsequently, groups of immigrants settled in Buenos Aires, Misiones, Chaco, Corrientes, Formosa, Mendoza, Río Negro, and Entre Ríos. Estimates of the Ukrainian and/or Ukrainian-descended population range to 1,000,000 people (the latter figure making Ukrainians up to 3,5% of the total Argentine population).

==== Welsh ====
The Welsh settlement in Argentina – known in Welsh as Y Wladfa – began in 1865 and occurred mainly along the coast of Chubut Province in the far southern region of Patagonia. In the 19th and early 20th century the Argentine government encouraged the immigration of Europeans to populate the country outside the Buenos Aires region; between 1856 and 1875 no fewer than 34 settlements of immigrants of various nationalities were established between Santa Fe and Entre Ríos. In addition to the main colony in Chubut, a smaller colony was set up in Santa Fe by 44 Welsh people who left Chubut, and another group settled at Coronel Suárez in southern Buenos Aires Province. In the early 21st century, around 50,000 Patagonians are of Welsh descent. The Welsh-Argentine community is centered around Gaiman, Trelew and Trevelin. By Chubut's own estimate, the number of Welsh speakers is about 25,000. The Welsh language is still present in Welsh communities of Argentina and they have developed their own dialect known as Patagonian Welsh.

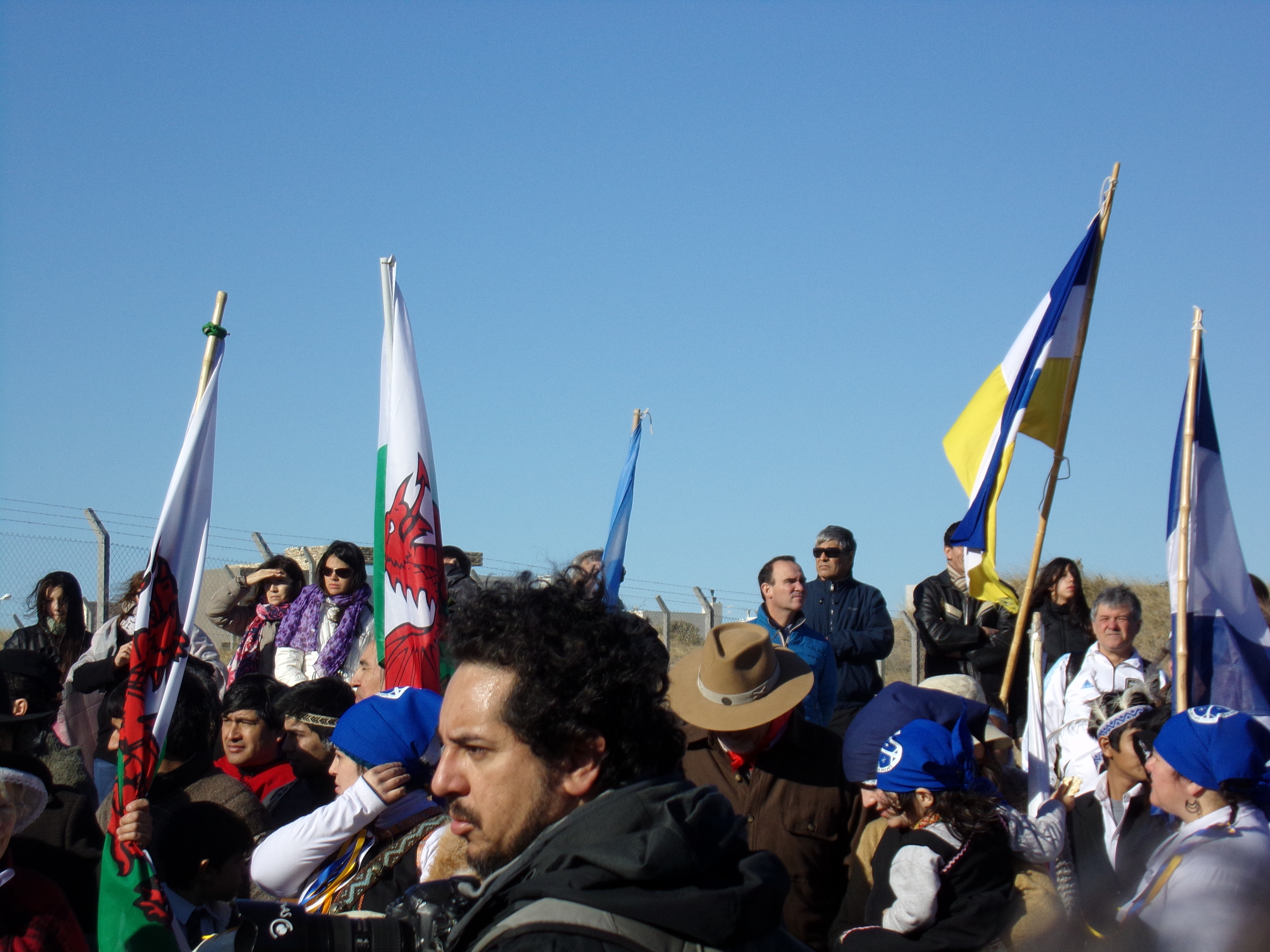
Welsh flags alongside Tehuelche flags in a ceremony in Punta Cuevas, Puerto Madryn, Cubut, Argentina

==== Jewish ====
The overwhelming majority of Argentina's Jewish community derives from immigrants of Northern, Central, and Eastern European origin (Ashkenazi Jews), although there is a significant Sephardic population. Argentina's Jewish population is, by far, the largest in all of Latin America and is the fifth largest in the world. Buenos Aires itself is said to have over 100,000 practicing Jews, making it one of the largest Jewish urban centers in the world (see also History of the Jews in Argentina).

==== Romani ====
There are approximately 300,000 Roma in Argentina.

=== West Asians ===
==== Levantine Arabs (Syrian-Lebanese) ====
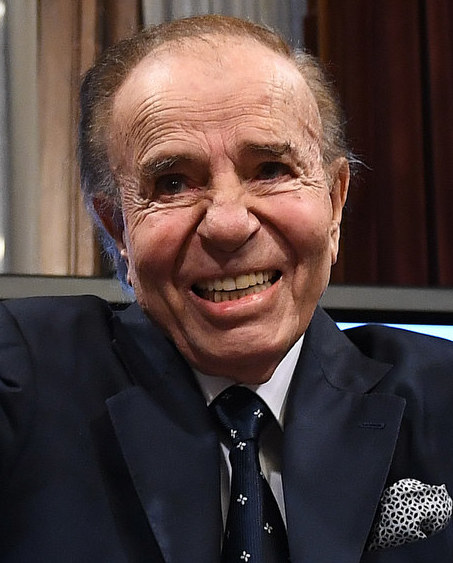
Former President Carlos Saúl Menem, a descendant of Syrian immigrants.

There are 1,300,000–5,000,000 Argentines whose ancestry traces back to any of various waves of immigrants, largely of Levantine cultural and linguistic heritage and/or identity.

Most Levantine Argentines are from Syrian background, originating mainly from what is now Syria There are people from other Arabic speaking countries in lesser numbers. Most are Christians of the Eastern Orthodox and Eastern Catholic (Maronite) churches. The first Levantine settled in Argentina in the 19th century, and most who came during this time period were Lebanese. From 1891 to 1920, 367,348 people of Levantine heritage immigrated into Argentina. When they were first processed in the ports of Argentina, they were classified as Turks because modern-day Lebanon as the rest of the levant were then occupied by the Turkish Ottoman Empire.

==== Armenians ====
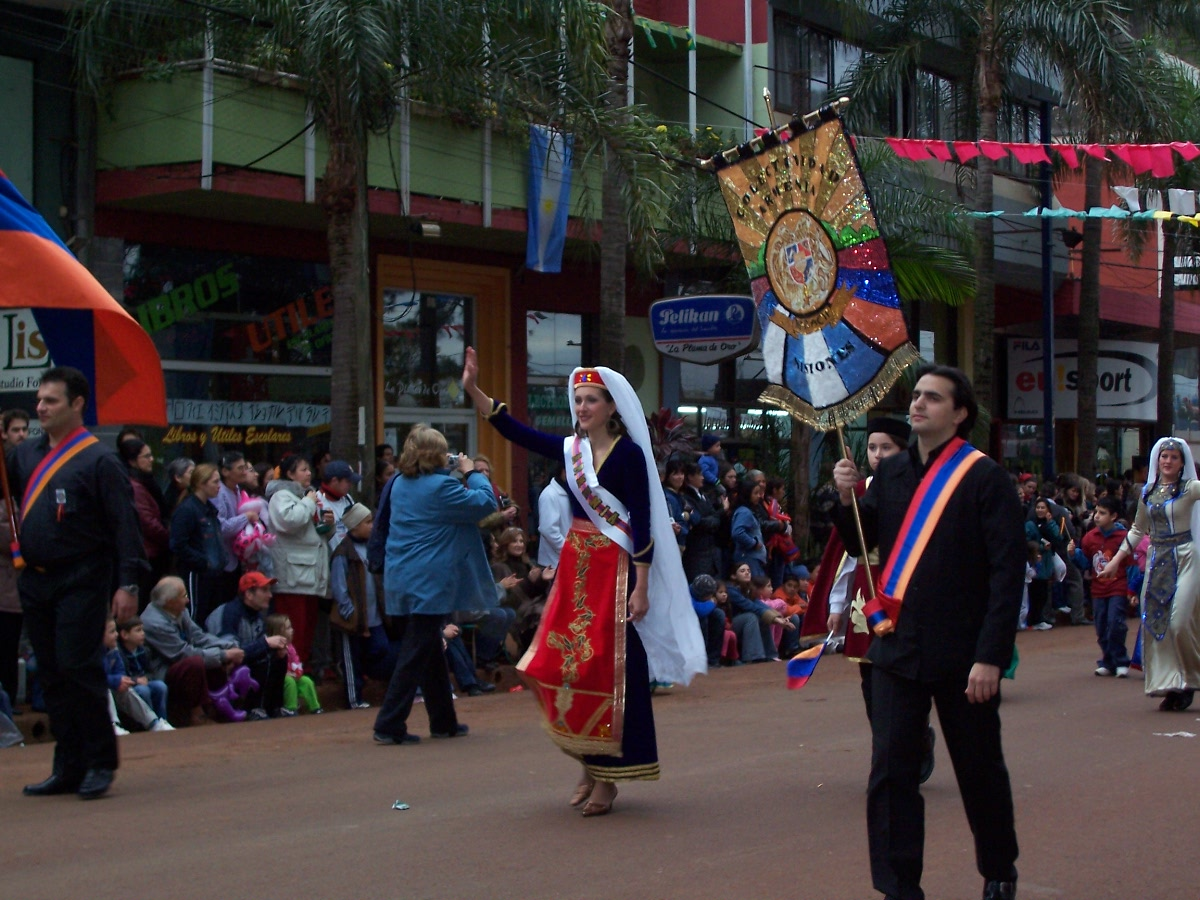
Armenian Argentines in Oberá, Misiones.

The Armenians came in different time periods. The first wave was in the late 19th century, as a result of the Adana massacres and such targeted at Armenians in the region of Cilicia. The second (and largest) wave was from the 1910s to the 1930s, originated solely by the Armenian genocide. Armenophobia rose again in Turkey in the mid-20th century, and created the final migration of Armenians to the world – some of them arrived in Argentina and formed a separate third wave. The last wave was a result of the fall of the Soviet Union.

There are 165,000 descendants of Armenians in Argentina, most of them in Buenos Aires.

=== Amerindians ===
Distribution of Amerindians according to the 2022 census.

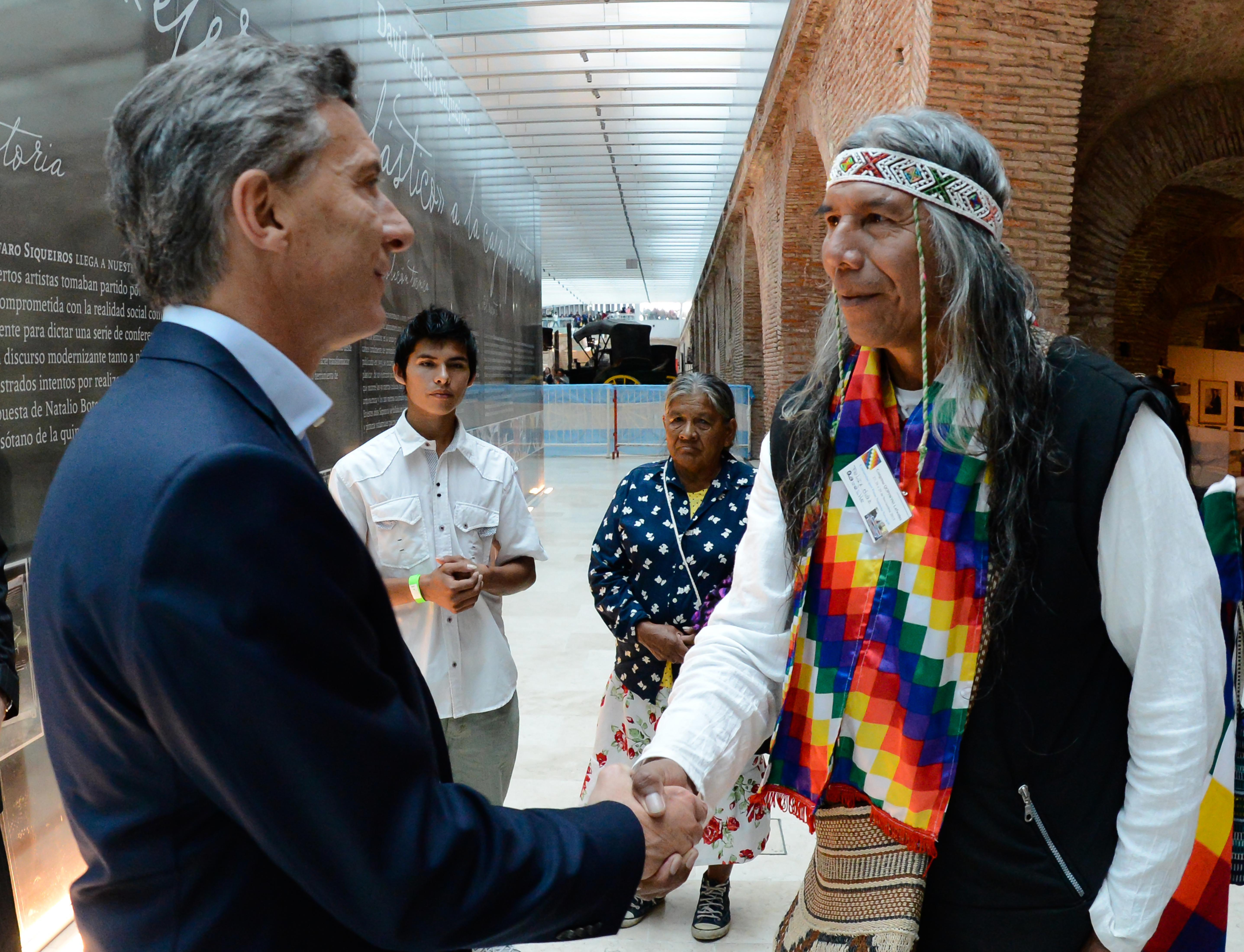
Mauricio Macri with Félix Díaz, an activist for the Toba people.

Argentina's National Institute of Indigenous Affairs (INAI) identifies 38 indigenous peoples throughout the country.

There are Amerindian groups like the Tobas, Aymaras, Guaraníes and Mapuches, among others, who still maintain their cultural roots, but are under continuous pressure for religious and idiomatic integration.

The local natives who speak Quechua adopted that language either after they were conquered by the Inca Empire (that reached Tucumán) or by the teachings of the Spanish religious missionaries who came from Peru to today's Santiago del Estero Province; the language is quickly losing importance. The Survey on Indigenous Populations, published by the National Institute for Statistics and Census, gives a total of 600,329 people who see themselves as descending from or belonging to an indigenous people, representing 1.5% of Argentina's population.

According to a recent study of 246 individuals, up to 30% of this population could have varying degrees of Native American ancestry, but other studies such as those carried by Norma Pérez Martín (2007) suggest at least 56% of Argentines would have indigenous ancestry

Regarding the indigenous peoples of Argentina, the Constitution of the Argentine nation in its article 17 says:

"Recognise the ethnic and cultural pre-existence of indigenous peoples. Guarantee respect for their identity and the right to a bilingual and intercultural education; recognise the legal status of their communities, and the communal possession and ownership of the lands they traditionally occupy; and regulate the provision of others suitable and sufficient for human development; none of them shall be alienable, transferable or subject to liens or encumbrances. Ensure their participation in the management of their natural resources and other interests affecting them. The provinces may exercise these powers concurrently".

Some provinces in Argentina have indigenous languages as official languages, for example the Corrientes Province has Guarani as an official language and the Jujuy Province has Quechua and Aymara as official languages.

Some of the fathers of Argentina's independence wanted that the new independent state to be governed by indigenous monarchy. The Inca plan of 1816 proposed that United Provinces of the Río de la Plata (Present Argentina) should be a monarchy, led by a descendant of the Inca. Juan Bautista Túpac Amaru (half-brother of Túpac Amaru II) was proposed as monarch. This proposal was supported by notable figures such as Manuel Belgrano, José de San Martín and Martín Miguel de Güemes. The Congress of Tucumán finally decided to reject the Inca's plan, creating instead a republican, centralist state.

==== Mapuche ====
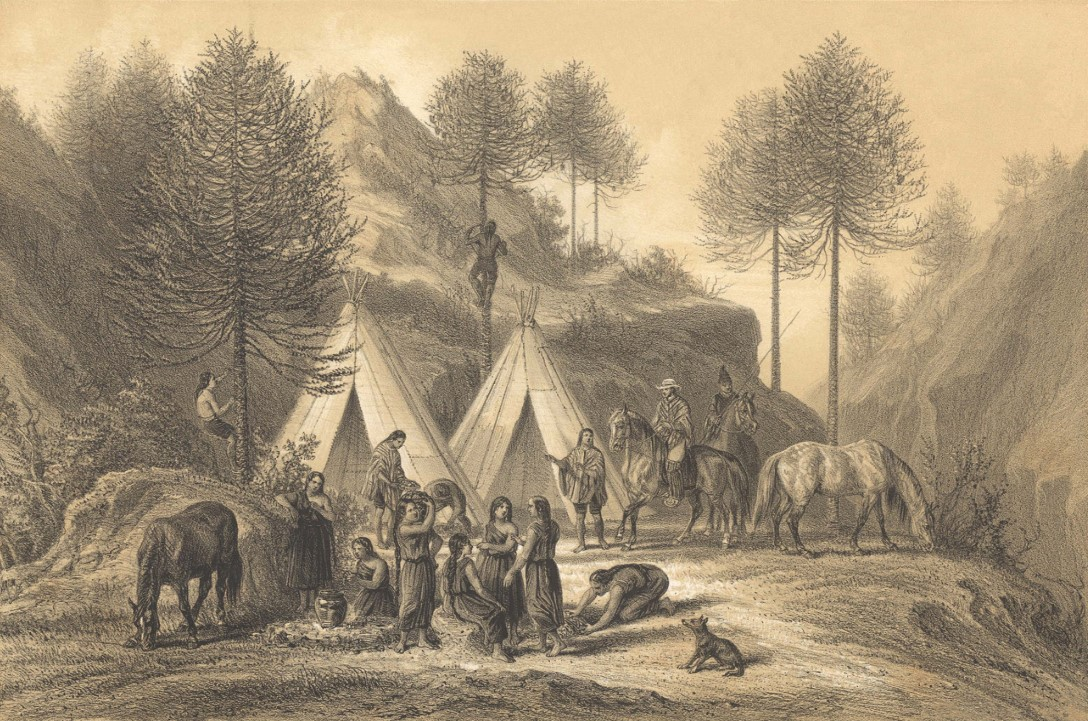
"The Pine Forests of Nahuelbuta", a work by Claude Gay depicting the Pehuenche people harvesting Araucaria pine nuts in the Andes.

The Mapuche (from the Mapudungún Mapuche autonym) are the largest indigenous people in the Southern Cone, inhabiting central and southern Chile and part of Argentina.

Mapuche languages are spoken in Chile and Argentina. The two living branches are Huilliche and Mapudungun. Although not genetically related, lexical influence has been discerned from Quechua. Linguists estimate that only about 200,000 full-fluency speakers remain in Chile. The language receives only token support in the educational system. In recent years, it has started to be taught in rural schools of Bío-Bío, Araucanía and Los Lagos Regions.

The Mapuche traditional economy is based on agriculture; their traditional social organization consists of extended families, under the direction of a lonko or chief. In times of war, the Mapuche would unite in larger groupings and elect a toki (meaning "axe" or "axe-bearer") to lead them. Mapuche material culture is known for its textiles and silverwork.

==== Toba ====
The Toba, also known as the Qom, are an ethnic group of the Pampido people who live in the Central Chaco. Around the 16th century, they began to inhabit a large part of northern Argentina in what are now the provinces of Salta, Chaco, Santiago del Estero and Formosa.

==== Guarani ====
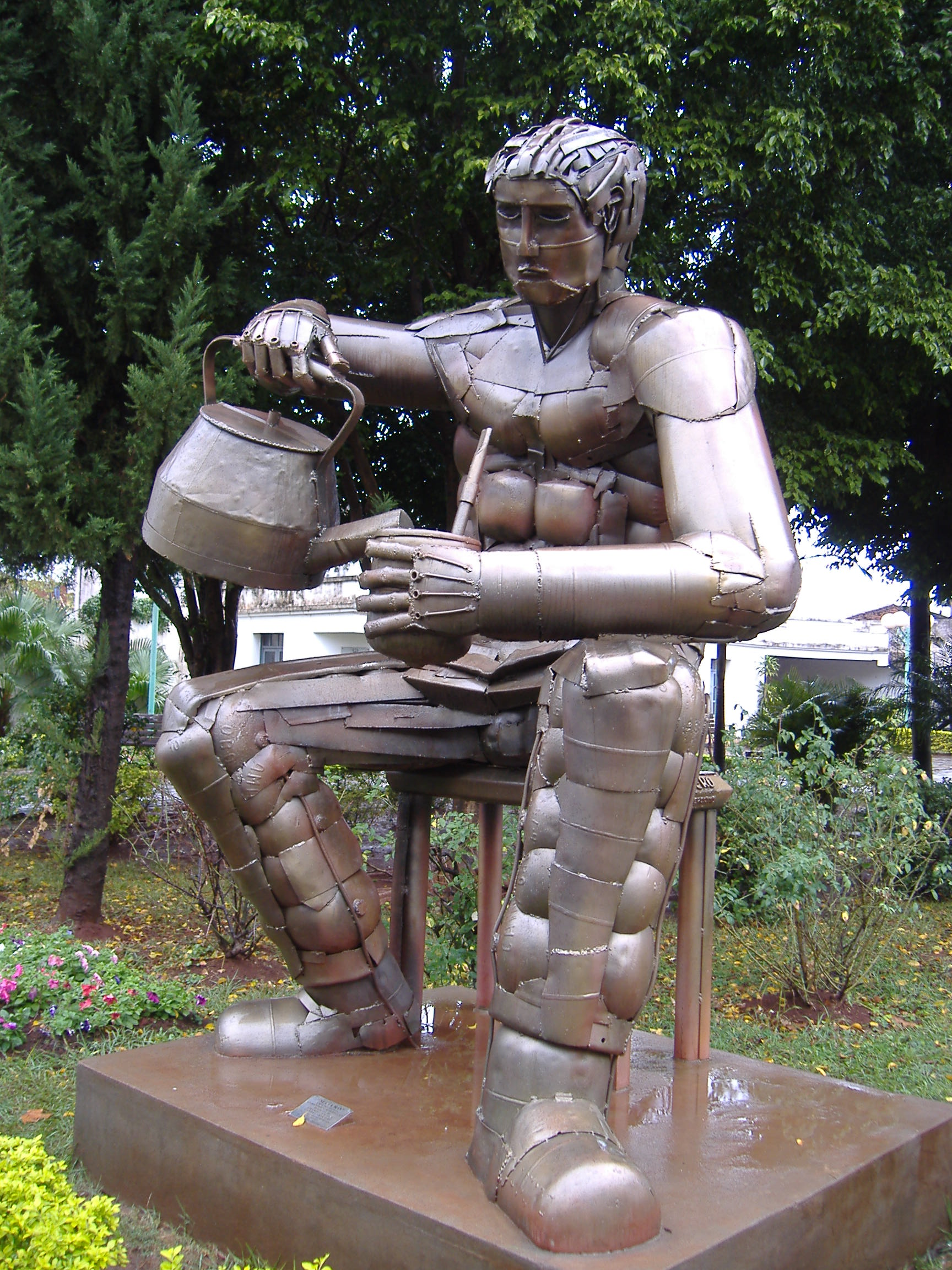
Matero, a statue of a man preparing to drink yerba mate infusion, in Posadas, Misiones, Argentina.

Guarani People are distinguished from the related Tupi by their use of the Guarani language. The traditional area of distribution of the Guaraní people is found in several countries (Paraguay, Bolivia, Uruguay, Brazil and Argentina), within Argentina they mostly inhabit the Misiones and Corrientes Provinces of Argentina. In the Corrientes Province, Guaraní is a co-official language.

The Guarani had a great impact on Argentine culture, for example mate was consumed by the Guarani and Tupi peoples in pre-colonial times. Other influences could be in the famous Argentine expression "che", which could come from the Guarani language, where "che irú" means "my companion".

===== Ava Guarani =====
Ava guaraní is the denomination currently adopted for a mixogenized indigenous culture guaraní-arahuaca formerly better known as chiriguana', which is settled mainly in southern Bolivia, from where it expanded into western Paraguay and northwestern Argentina.

===== Mbyá Guaraní =====
The Mbyá Guaraní, are a branch of the Guaraní people who live in Paraguay, Brazil, Argentina, and Uruguay. In the Argentine region of Misiones, Mbyá coexist, in the same familial communities, with members of the Xiripá Guaraní and Pai Tavytera groups. There are 120 such communities, known as tekoás, in the region, and there are approximately 11,000 Mbyá in Argentina as a whole. Two large communities in Misiones near Iguazu Falls, Fortin Mborore and Yriapú, are home to more than 2,000 people.

==== Diaguita ====
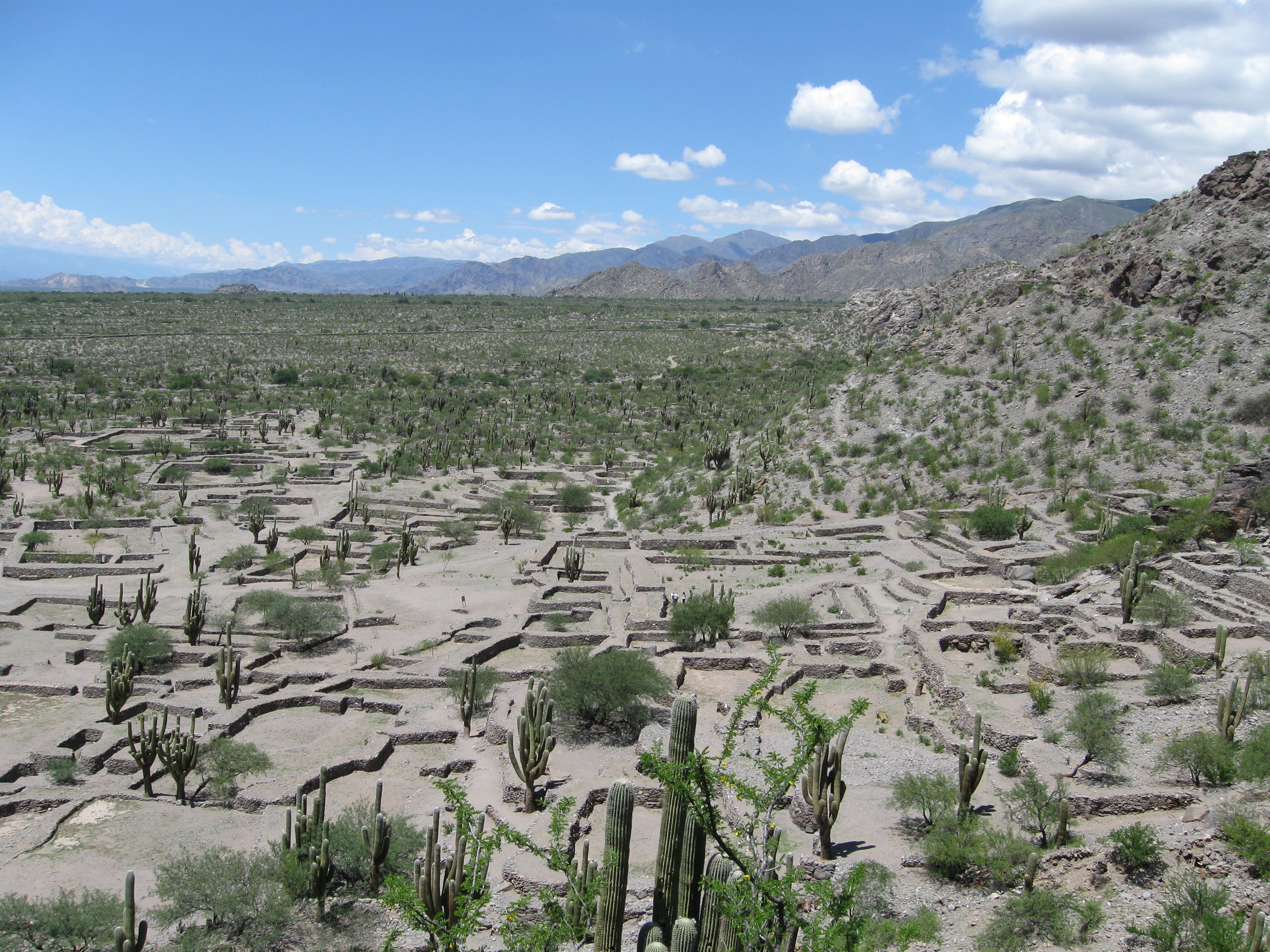
The Ruins of Quilmes in the Calchaquí Valley, Tucumán.

The Diaguita are a group of South American Indians from Chile's Norte Chico and northwestern Argentina. According to the 2010 census there are 67,410 self-identified Diaguita descendants in Argentina.

==== Qulla ====
They are a people who live in countries such as Argentina, Bolivia and Chile. In Argentina they are mostly located in the Corrientes, Jujuy and Catamarca provinces.

==== Wichí ====
They are a people who have historically inhabited Argentina, Bolivia and Paraguay. In Argentina approximately fifty thousand people have identified themselves as Whichís.

==== Comechingón ====
Comechingón is the common name for a group of people indigenous to the Argentine provinces of Córdoba and San Luis. They were thoroughly displaced or exterminated by the Spanish conquistadores by the end of the 17th century. According to the 2010 census there are 34,546 self-identified Comechingón descendants in Argentina.

==== Tehuelche ====
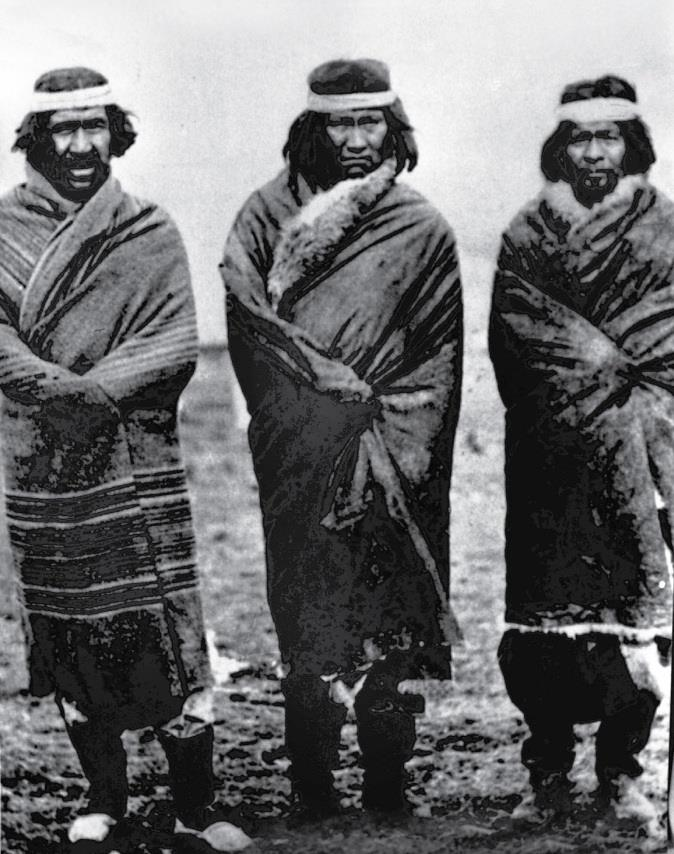
Tehuelche chieftains located in Chubut in 1903.

The Aónikenk people, also referred to by the exonym Tehuelche, are an indigenous people from Patagonia in South America, with existing members of the group currently residing in the southern Argentina-Chile borders. The 2010 National Population Census in Argentina revealed the existence of 27,813 people who considered themselves Tehuelche throughout the country, 7924 in the Chubut Province, 4570 in the interior of the Buenos Aires Province, 2615 in the Santa Cruz Province, 2269 in the Río Negro Province, 1702 in the city of Buenos Aires, 844 in the Mendoza Province, 738 in the Neuquén Province and 625 in the La Pampa Province.

==== Mocoví ====
The Mocoví are an indigenous tribe of the Gran Chaco region of South America. They speak the Mocoví language and are one of the ethnic groups belonging to the Guaycuru peoples. In the 2010 Argentine census, 22,439 people self-identified as Mocoví.

==== Querandí ====
According to the 2010 census there are 3,658 self-identified Querandí in Argentina.

==== Mbayá ====
According to the 2010 census there are 7,379 self-identified Mbayá in Argentina.

==== Ranquel ====
The Ranquel or Rankülche are an indigenous tribe from the northern part of La Pampa Province, Argentina, in South America. According to the 2010 census there are 14,860 self-identified Ranquel in Argentina.

==== Selkʼnam ====
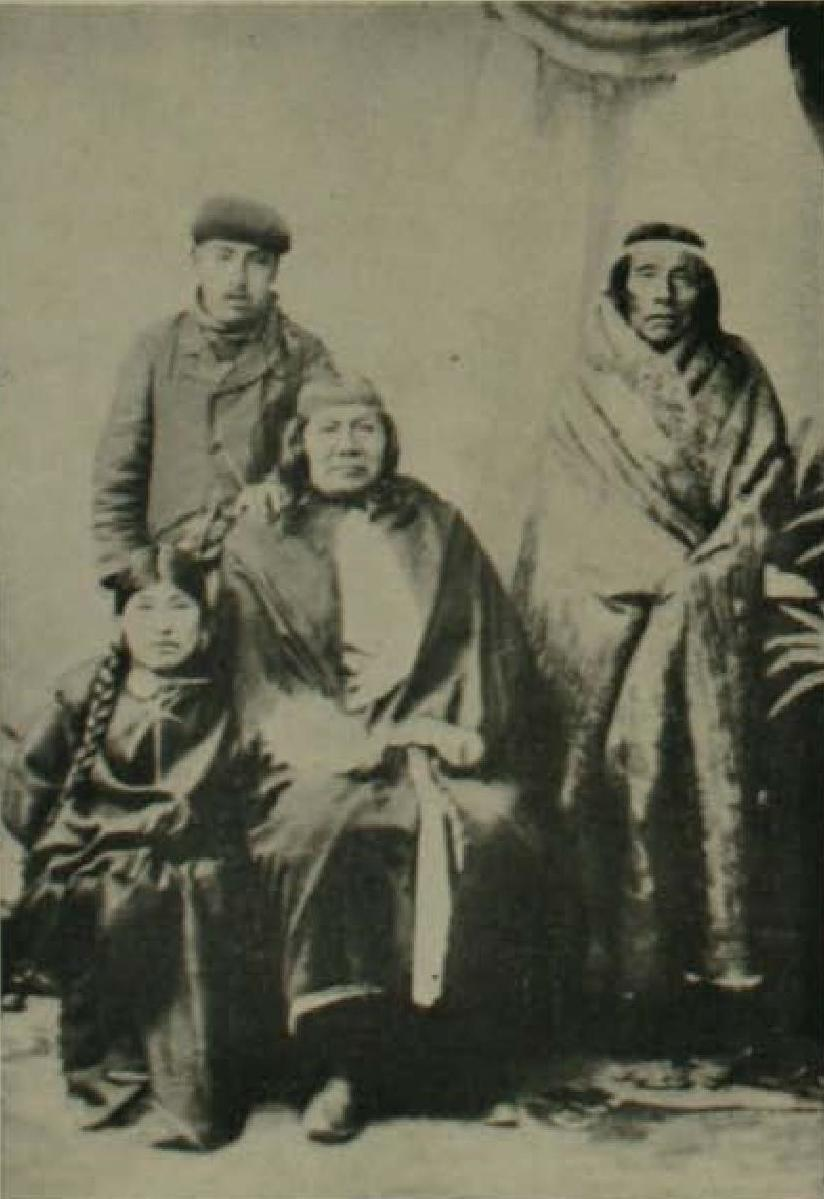
Selkʼnam family 1915.

The Selkʼnam, also known as the Onawo or Ona people, are an indigenous people in the Patagonian region of southern Argentina and Chile. They were one of the last native groups in South America to be encountered by Europeans in the late 19th century. In the mid-19th century, there were about 4000 Selkʼnam; by 1919 there were 297, and by 1930 just over 100.

The exploration of gold and the introduction of farming in the region of Tierra del Fuego led to genocide of the Selkʼnam perpetrated by the regimes of both states (Argentina and Chile). Joubert Yanten Gomez, a Chilean mestizo, has taught himself the language and is considered the only speaker; he uses the name Keyuk.

According to Argentina's 2010 census, 696 people recognise themselves as descendants of the Selkʼnam people, but they are mestizos and do not speak the Selkʼnam language.

==== Charrúa ====
The Charrúa were an Indigenous Southern Cone people in present-day Argentina (Entre Ríos), Uruguay and Brazil (Rio Grande do Sul). They were a semi-nomadic people who sustained themselves mainly through hunting and gathering. Since resources were not permanent in every region, they would constantly be on the move. Rain, drought, and other environmental factors determined their movement. For this reason they are often classified as seasonal nomads.

In Argentina 14,649 people identify themselves as Charrúa.

==== Tonocoté ====
The Tonocotés or Tonokotés are an aboriginal people inhabiting the provinces of Santiago del Estero and Tucumán in Argentina.

The Spaniards called the tonocotés and other peoples of the former Tucumán as Juríes, deformation of the Quechua word xuri that means Rhea, because of the kind of loincloth feathers of this bird that the natives wore and that they moved into real flocks. In 1574 the name of tonocoté appears on a document and eventually supplanted the earlier denomination.

Current tonocotés are known as suritas. They are partially mestizos descended from the ancient tonocotés and speak their own dialect derived from Santiago del Estero's quichua. They are distributed in 19 rural communities with about 6,000 residents in the departments of San Martín, Figueroa and Avellaneda from Santiago del Estero. (According to the 2010 national census, the tonocotés village had 4,853 inhabitants)

==== Atacama ====
The Atacama people, also called Atacameño, are indigenous people from the Atacama Desert and altiplano region in the north of Chile and Argentina and southern Bolivia. According to the Argentine Census in 2010, 13,936 people identified as first-generation Atacameño in Argentina. In the past they spoke a language known as Kunza, to day the Kunza language is an isolate extinct language once spoken Chile, Argentina and Bolivia who have since shifted to Spanish and Quechua, to a lesser extent. The last speaker was documented in 1949. However, there are elderly people who can remember the meaning of many words and a dictionary has been created with the intention of recovering them. Julio Vilte, a native of Toconao, was able to compile a vocabulary and publish a dictionary in 2004.

==== Huarpes ====
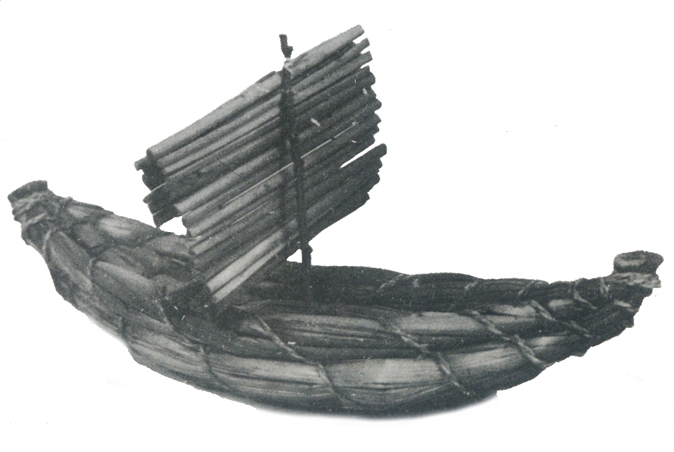
Huarpe Canoe.

The Huarpes or Warpes are an indigenous people of Argentina, living in the Cuyo region. According to the 2010 Argentine census, 34,279 people identified themselves as Huarpes. They were divided into four large groups, each corresponding to their geographic location and also to differences in language:

- Huarpes Allentiac (San Juan)
- Huarpes Millcayac (North of the province of Mendoza)
- Huarpes Chiquillanes (South of the province of Mendoza)
- Huarpes Guanacaches (Northeast of Mendoza, North of San Luis and in the southeast of San Juan)

==== Amerindians from neighboring countries ====
===== Quechua =====
The Quechua people originate from the regions of present-day Peru, Bolivia, and Ecuador in the Andes Mountains; centered in Cusco, they expanded the Inca Empire from Colombia down to Chile and Argentina. The Southern Quechua language have and had a great impact on the Spanish dialects of the region. Words like "Cancha" (Stadium) or "Palta" (avocado) have their origin in Quechuan languages. According to the 2010 census, the Quecha People would be composed of 55,493 people only in Argentina. The 2010 National Population Census in Argentina also revealed that there are self-identified Quechua people all over the country.

===== Aymara =====
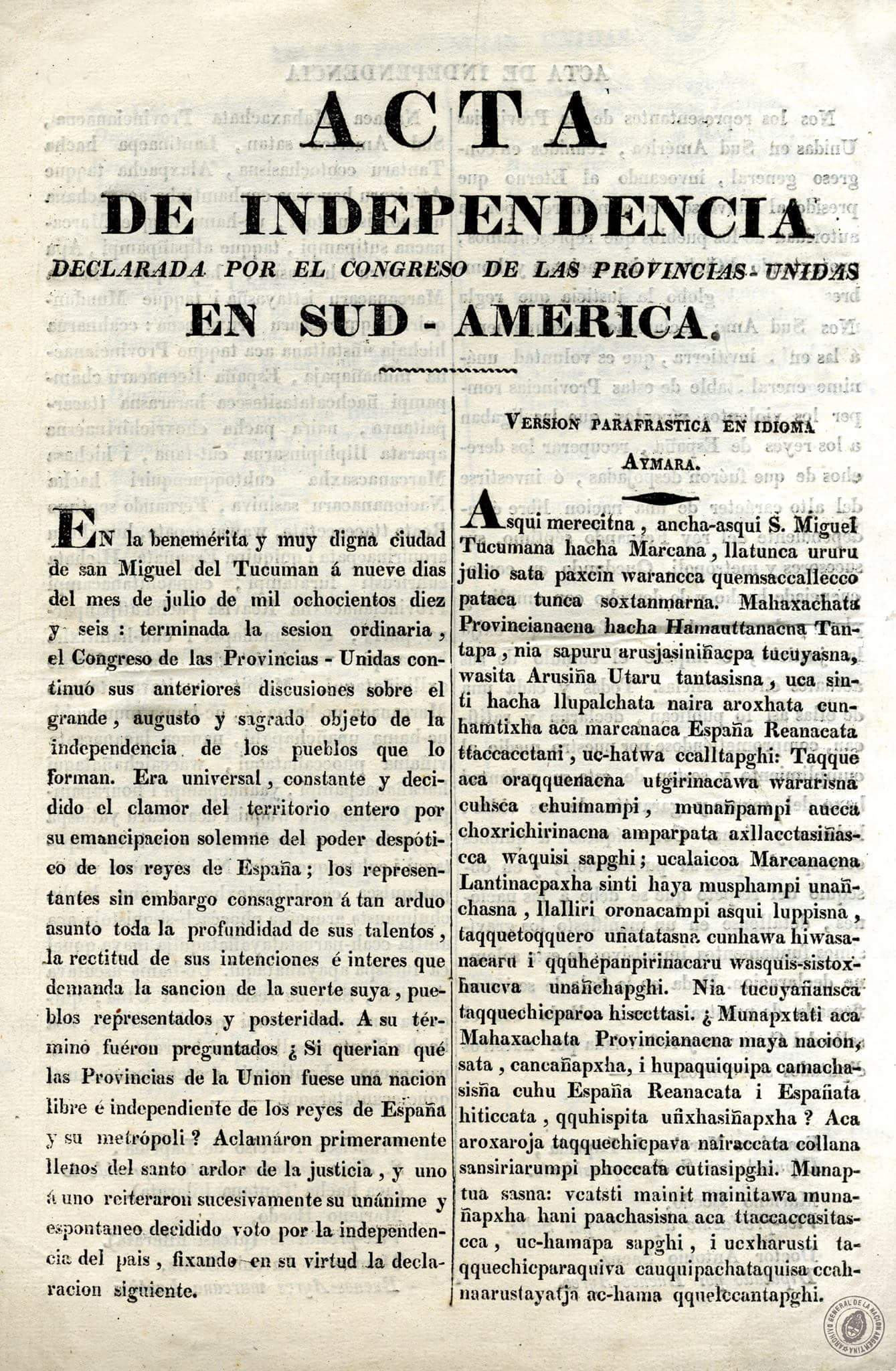
Declaration of Independence of the Provincias Unidas del Río de la Plata in Spanish and Aymara.

In the 2010 Argentine census, 20,822 people self-identified as Aymara.

The immigration of Aymara people, inhabitants of the present-day Bolivian Altiplano around Lake Titicaca (a region known as Upper Peru during the Spanish colonial era), played a significant role in the initial settlement of what is now Argentine territory. The earliest agricultural-pottery civilization, the Tafí culture (200 BC), has been attributed to a migration of people from the Bolivian Altiplano. During the colonial period, the relationship between the mining infrastructure centered on Cerro Rico and the northern part of present-day Argentina, a producer of textiles and pack animals, sustained a constant two-way migration between the regions. Additionally, the University of Charcas served as a major draw for the population of the Viceroyalty of the Río de la Plata.

The Túpac Katari uprising of 1781 and its bloody suppression triggered a significant migration of revolutionaries from Upper Peru to Buenos Aires for political reasons.

=== Black Africans ===
Distribution of Black Africans according to the 2022 census.

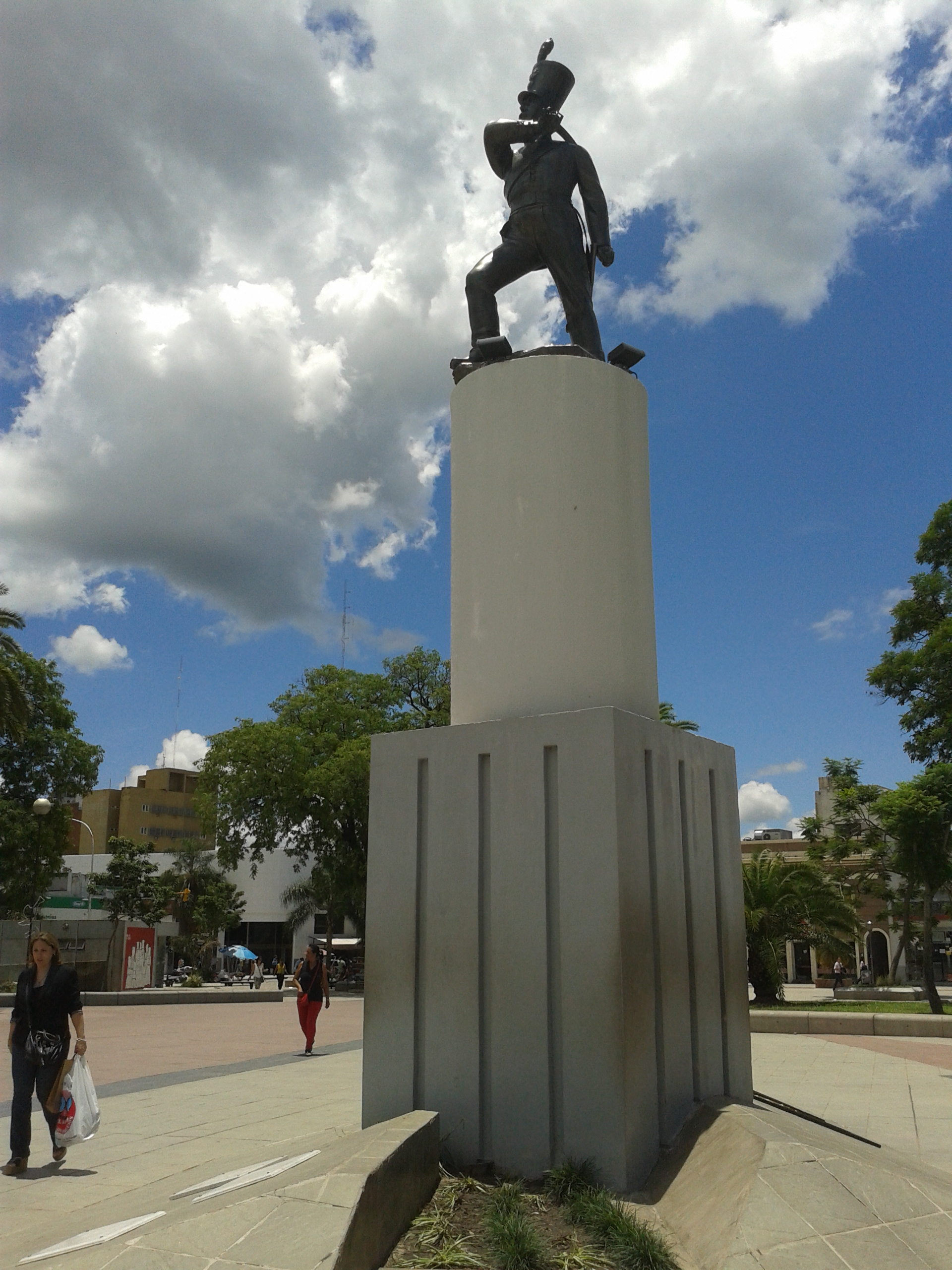
Monument to Sgt. Juan Bautista Cabral in Corrientes, Argentina. Cabral was a zambo (of mixed black and indigenous descent).

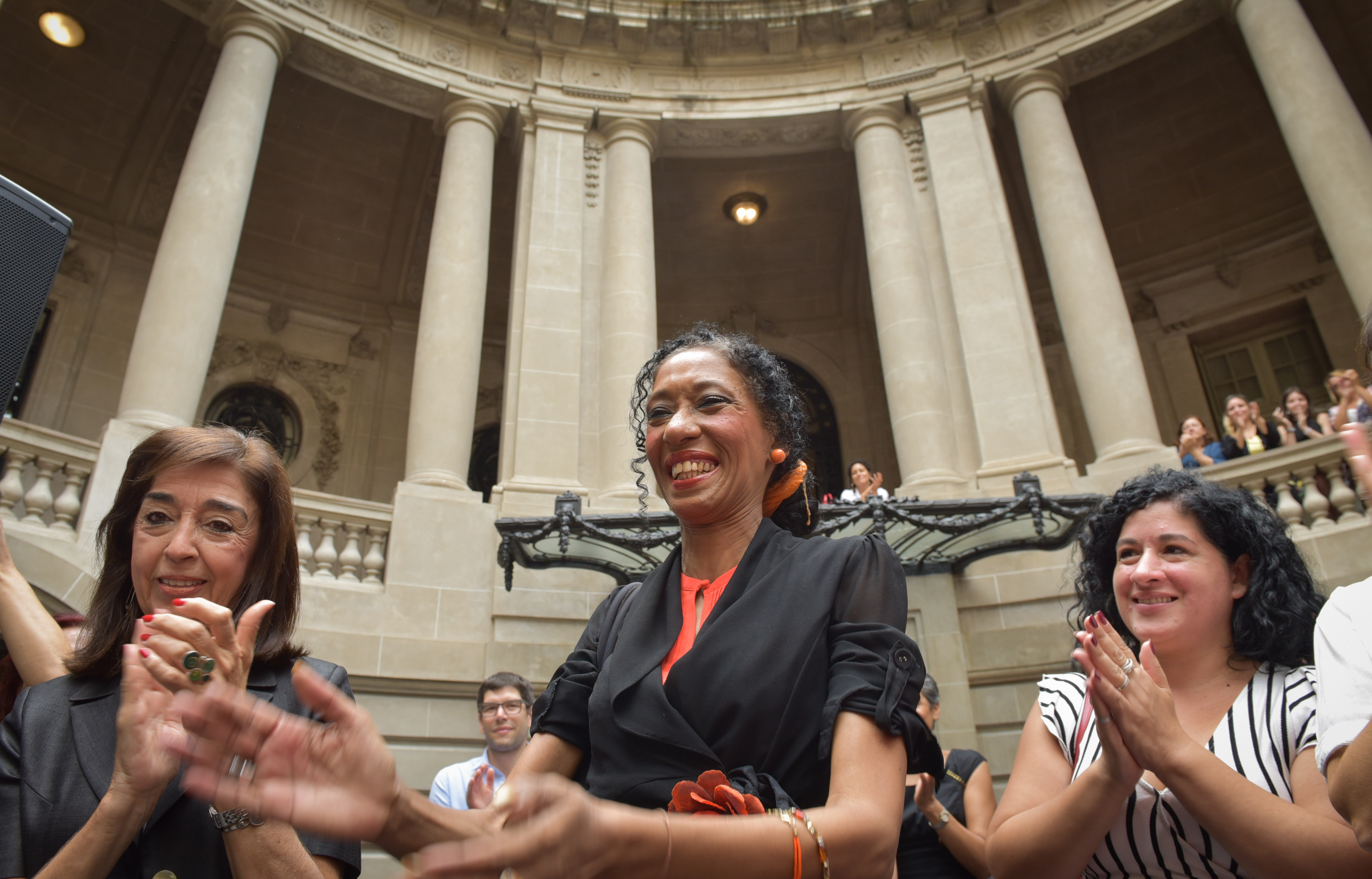
María Fernanda Silva, Argentina's first black ambassador.

Since the 15th century, groups of African slaves were exported to Argentina. From the 16th century, most Africans brought to Argentina belonged to ethnic groups who speak Bantu languages, coming from the territories now comprising the Republic of Congo, the Democratic Republic of Congo, Angola and Mozambique. Many slaves of these countries were bought in Brazil, a country where most of the slaves were from these countries, especially from Angola. In 1680–1777 came at least 40,000 slaves in the region, while among the latter date and 1812, when traffic was halted, some 70,000 were landed in Buenos Aires and Montevideo (that figure must be added another, unknown, admitted slave overland from Rio Grande do Sul).

Afro-Argentines were up to a third of the population during colonial times, most of them slaves brought from Africa to work for the criollos. The 1813 Assembly decreed the Freedom of Wombs Law of 1813, which automatically freed slaves' children at birth, forty years later, in 1853, the abolition of slavery became law. Many Afro-Argentines contributed to the independence of Argentina such as María Remedios del Valle who is known as "La Madre de la Patria" (mother of the fatherland in English) and Sgt. Juan Bautista Cabral. Also there is a debate, among the historians, as to whether or not Bernardino Rivadavia, the first president of the United Provinces of the Río de la Plata, was of African descent.

A number of myths have surged to explain the apparent disappearance of Argentina's black population. One popular myth claims that during the Paraguayan War, thousands of black citizens were forcibly conscripted and used as front-line soldiers, leading to large casualties that decreased the number of Afro-Argentines. Historian George Reid Andrews retorts that composition of the Argentine Army in 1853 meant that only two battalions of blacks served in the war, and thus this could not have been the cause of the reduction of the Afro-Argentine population. Recent historical studies suggest that that state-led blanqueamiento policies and miscegenation with an increasingly white population and with indigenous people could be the real causes of this reduction in the Afro-Argentine population. Censuses were used as a way of making black populations invisible, for example by creating new categories.

Of the population of 40,117,096 in the 2010 national census, 149,493 (0.37%) self-identified as Afro-Argentine. According to genetic studies, Sub-Saharan African admixture in Argentines is around 4%. World Bank and Argentine government estimates have suggested the Argentine population with some African ancestry could number over 2 million. Since the 2000s, African immigrants, for example from Senegal, have been attracted by Argentina's flexible migration policies.

November 8 has been celebrated as the National Day of Afro-Argentines and African Culture. The date was chosen to commemorate the recorded date for the death of María Remedios del Valle.

=== East Asians ===
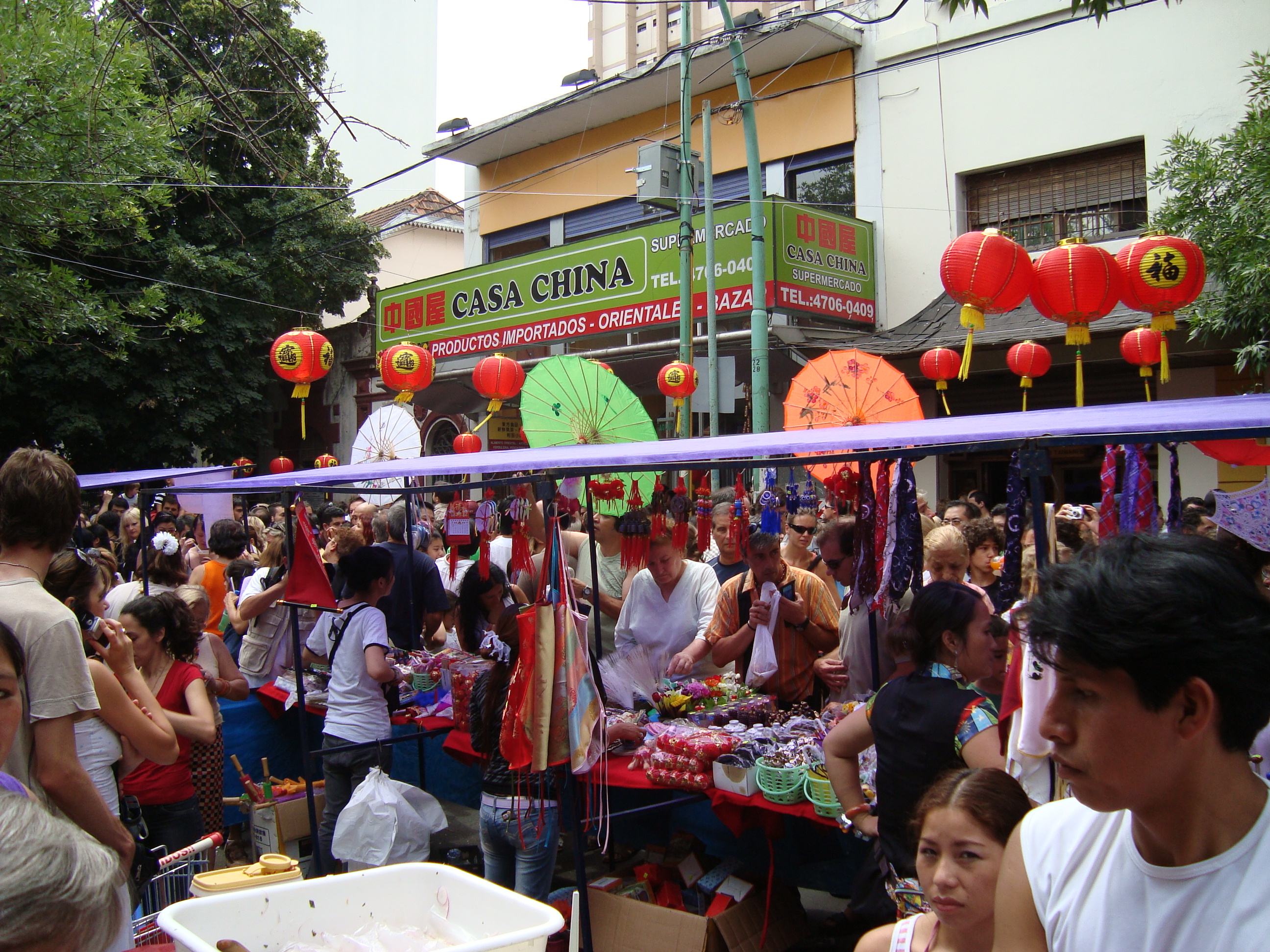
Lunar New Year celebration party in Buenos Aires Chinatown.

The first Asian Argentines were of Japanese descent, arriving in the 1900s. For most of the 20th century they were the only Asians in Argentina. Japanese immigrants were primarily from the island of Okinawa; the majority of dry cleaning establishments in Buenos Aires were, by the mid-20th century, Japanese businesses. During the 1970s the main Asian influx was from South Korea, and during the 1990s from Taiwan and Laos. Unlike most immigrants who arrived earlier in the century, they tended to remain in close social circles and not mix with other local ethnicities. This excluded the Japanese who were the first to arrive and therefore the first to produce a native generation of mixed race Japanese-Argentines, thus integrating more so than the other Asian groups.

==== Han Chinese ====
Chinese Argentines are Argentine citizens of Chinese ancestry or Chinese-born immigrants. The Chinese Argentine community is one of the fastest-growing communities in Argentina. As of 2018, the community was made up of 200,000 people, the 0.45% of the Argentine population.

==== Japanese ====
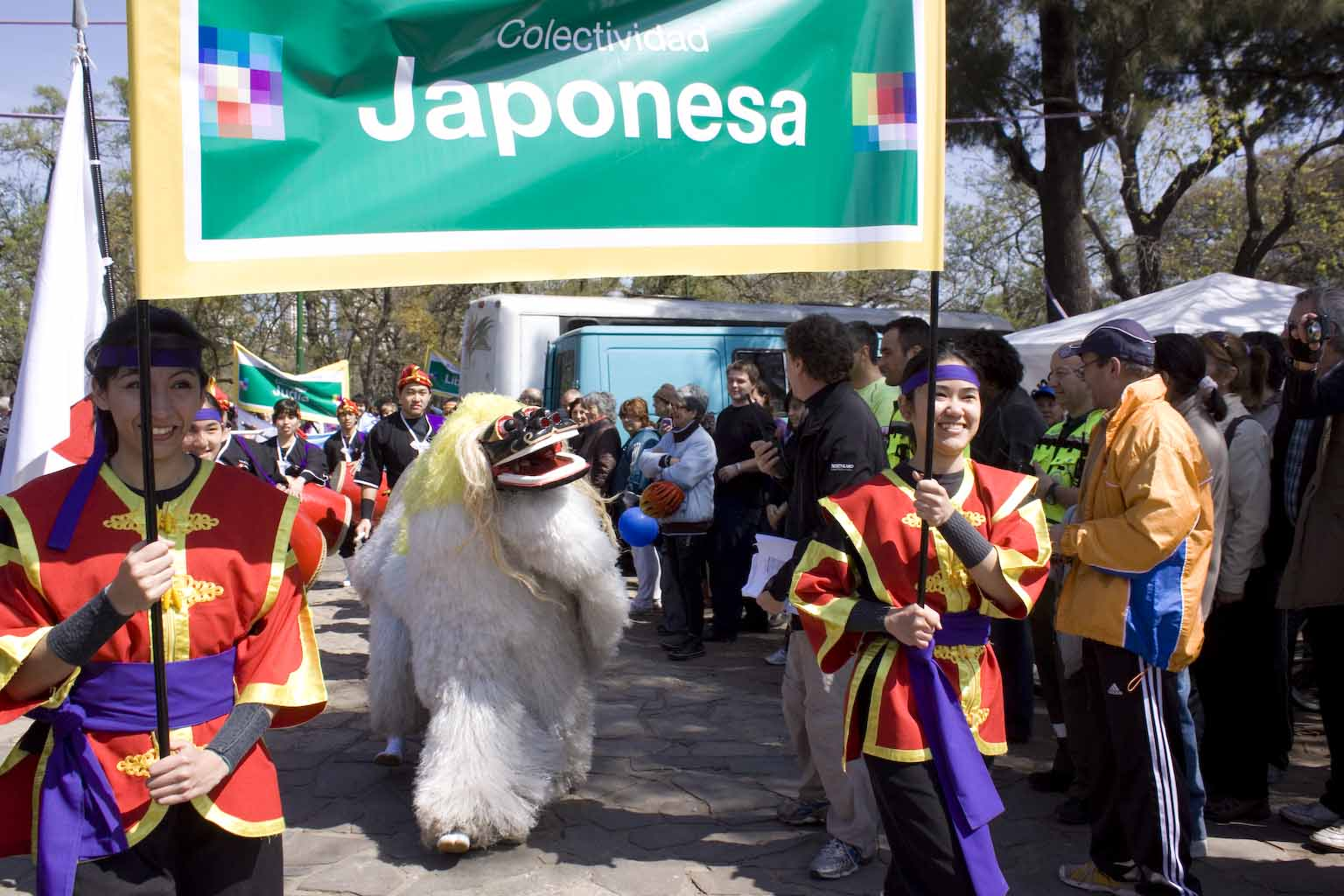
Japan at the 2011 Immigrant Day celebration in Buenos Aires.

The Japanese-Argentine population assimilated well into Argentine society, and nearly 78% of the fourth generation of Japanese-Argentines (Yonsei) are of mixed European and Japanese descent, mostly intermixed with immigrants from Italy and Spain, and in lesser number from the United Kingdom, France (mainly Occitania), Germany and Switzerland. The use of Japanese language has declined in Argentina and the Japanese-Argentine citizens speak the nation's national language, Spanish, although a minority of them only speak Japanese when living with a Japanese-born relative at home, but when they are living with Argentine-born relatives they only speak Spanish.

Intermarriage in the Japanese-Argentine community. Proportion of mixed-race in each generation (%):

- Issei (immigrants): 0%
- Nisei (children): 9%
- Sansei (grandchildren): 66%
- Yonsei (great-grandchildren): 78%

==== Koreans ====
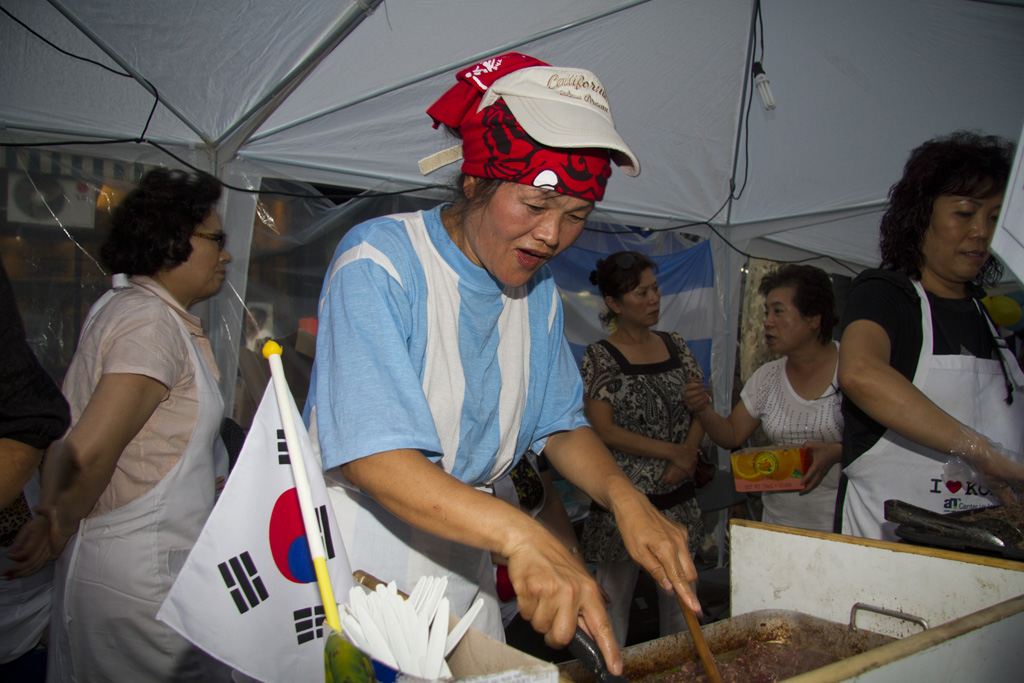
Korean woman cooking while wearing an Argentina national team shirt in Buenos Aires.

Argentine Koreans are the second-largest Korean diaspora community in South America and the 16th largest in the world, according to the statistics of South Korea's Ministry of Foreign Affairs and Trade. Their population declined by more than 50% between 1997 and 2003. Despite the small rebound in their numbers since then, they have been surpassed in size by the rapidly growing Chinese Argentine community (which since the 1990s has been increasing non-stop and is expected to become one of the biggest immigrant groups in Argentina, together with Paraguayan, Bolivian and Peruvian immigrants). In the 2010s decade, the Korean community in Argentina has fallen behind Korean communities in Australia, New Zealand, the United Kingdom, the United States, Brazil, Canada, Singapore, The United Arab Emirates and Southeast Asia.

==== Laotian ====
Argentina is also home to the largest Lao community in South America, with almost 2,000 people. This group emigrated due to the consequences of the Pathet Lao victory in the Lao Civil War. They arrived in Argentina thanks to the fact that after an International Conference in Geneva convened by the United Nations in mid-1979, the de facto President Jorge Rafael Videla decided to collaborate by "opening the country's doors", with the aim of improving the international image of his regime in terms of human rights. Approximately 300 families were received between 1979 and 1981.

=== Indians ===
Also there is a small community of Indians in Argentina who are mainly immigrants or descendant of immigrants from India and form the Caribbean with Indo-Caribbean influence (i.e. Guyana, Trinidad and Tobago and Suriname). Most of them live in the provinces of Salta, the city of Buenos Aires, the province of the same name, Córdoba, Catamarca and Tucumán. In recent years there has been an increase in immigration from India, but still in small numbers.

== Estimated Argentine ancestry ==
Argentina's National Institute of Statistics and Censuses (INDEC) does not conduct ethnic/racial censuses, nor does it include questions about ethnicity. Traditionally, only questions on identification with a particular community of Indigenous peoples were conducted, as well as questions on the national origin of immigrants, in order to better identify and protect these communities. Since the 2010 census, the Afro-descendants category was also added.

As a result, most of the figures in this table come from varied estimates and sources that attempt to map the different patterns of ancestry that have shaped the modern Argentine population. As these figures mostly represent partial ancestry, numbers may overlap and not add up to the total.

Full, Predominant or Partial Ancestry	Number of descendants	Percentage	References date
European	Maybe more than 45 million with at least one European ancestor	97% with some European ancestry	2008
Spanish	"Predominant"		2018
Italian	15—30 million	30—70%	1996; 2010; 2011; 2020; 2023
Amerindian	Maybe more than 15-20 million with at least one native ancestor on one parental lineage. Maybe more than 5 million with at least one native ancestor on both parental lineages. 955,032 Argentines self-identify as belonging to a community of indigenous peoples or as first-generation descendants of indigenous peoples.	30-56% with at least one native ancestor, 11% with native ancestors on both parental lineages. 2.38% identify as belonging to an indigenous community.	2005. 2011; 2021; 2022
Spanish and Italian	Possibly more than 20 million with both Italian and Spanish ancestors	Possibly more than 50%	
French	6 million	17%	2006
Galician	5.5 million	11.9%	2023
Middle Eastern Arab	3.5 million or little more	A little over 7%	2011; 2015
Volga German and German	2.5 million Volga German and between 600 thousand—1 million German or little more	A little over 4% or 7%	2021
Basque	3—3.5 million	6.5%—7.6%	2004; 2012
Sub-Saharan African	Around 2 million with at least one African ancestor on one parental lineage. 302,936 individuals identified as Afro-Argentines on the 2022 census.	Around 4% with at least some African ancestry. 0.66% identify as Afro-Argentines.	2014; 2018; 2021; 2022
Irish	600 thousand—1 million	Between 1.3% and 2.2%	2005; 2017
Polish	At least 500 thousand	At least 1%	2004
Ukrainian	250—470 thousand	0.54% to 1.02%	2008; 2012; 2022; 2022
Russian	100—350 thousand	0.22% to 0.76%	2010; 2019
Jewish	250—330 thousand	Between 0.54% and 0.72%	2018
Croatian	250 thousand	0.54%	2013; 2022
Chinese	250 thousand	0.54%	2005; 2010; 2019
Armenian	80—135 thousand	Between 0.17% and 0.29%	2018
Scottish	100 thousand	Around 0.22%	2008
English	100 thousand	Around 0.22%	1985
Swiss	Possibly 100 thousand	Around 0.22%	2019
Japanese	76 thousand	Around 0.16%	2024; 2011
Welsh	50—70 thousand	Around 0.1% to 0.15%	2008; 2015
Dutch	60 thousand	0.13%	2012
Bulgarian	40—80 thousand	Around 0.08% to 0.17%	2008
Albanians	50 thousand	0.11%	2021
Belarusian	50 thousand	0.11%	2012
Montenegrin	50 thousand	0.11%	2018
Hungarian	40—50 thousand	0.08% to 0.10%	2010; 2016; 2016
Portuguese	42 thousand	0.09%	2016
Czech	At least 40 thousand	At least 0.08%	2009
Greek	30-50 thousand	Around 0.06% to 0.10%	2006; 2018
Lithuanian	At least 35 thousand	At least 0.07%	2016
Macedonian	30 thousand	0.06%	2011
Serbian	30 thousand	Around 0.06%	2010
Slovene	30 thousand	Around 0.06%	2003
Scandinavian	At least 28 thousand	At least 0.06%	2010; 2014
Belgian	At least 25 thousand	At least 0.054%	2010
Korean	20—25 thousand	0.043% to 0.054%	2010; 2022
Austrian	At least 10 thousand	At least 0.02%	2010
Romanian	At least 10 thousand	At least 0.02%	2014
Laotian	At least 2 thousand	At least 0.004%	2005

== Surnames of the presidents ==
Origin of the surnames of Argentine leaders, directors, and presidents
#	Head of state	1st surname	2nd surname	3rd surname	Ethnoracial group	Presidential period
°	Cornelio Saavedra y Rodríguez	Spain (Galician)	Spain (Castilian)		White	1810-1811
°	Domingo Matheu Chicola	Spain (Catalan)	Spain (Catalan)		White	1811
°	Gervasio A. de Posadas y Dávila	Spain (Castilian)	Spain (Galician)		White	1814-1815
°	Carlos María de Alvear y Balbastro	Spain (Castilian)	Spain (Castilian)		White	1815
°	José Rondeau Pereyra	France (French)	Portugal (Portuguese)		White	1815; 1820
°	Ignacio Álvarez Thomas	Spain (Castilian)	England (English)		White	1815-1816
°	Antonio González Balcarce	Spain (Castilian)	(Basque Country (autonomous community)) Spain (Catalan)		White	1816
°	Juan Martín de Pueyrredón y O'Dogan	France (French)	(Republic of Ireland) Ireland (Irish)		White	1816-1819
°	Juan Pedro Aguirre y López de Anaya	(Basque Country (autonomous community)) Euskadi (Basque)	Spain (Castilian)		White	1820
1°	Bernardino González y Rodríguez de Rivadavia	Spain (Castilian)	Spain (Castilian)		White	1826-1827
2°	Vicente López y Planes	Spain (Castilian)	Spain (Catalan)		White	1827
3°	Justo José de Urquiza y García	(Basque Country (autonomous community)) Euskadi (Basque)	Spain (Castilian)		White	1854-1860
4°	Santiago Derqui Rodríguez	(Basque Country (autonomous community)) Euskadi (Basque)	Spain (Castilian)		White	1860-1861
5°	Juan Esteban Pedernera	Spain (Castilian)			White	1861
6°	Bartolomé Mitre Martínez	Spain (Greek)	Spain (Castilian)		White	1862-1868
7°	Domingo F. Sarmiento Albarracín	Spain (Castilian)	Spain (Arabic)		White	1868-1874
8°	Nicolás Avellaneda Silva	Spain (Castilian)	Portugal (Portuguese)		White	1874-1880
9°	Julio Argentino Roca Paz	Spain (Catalan)	Spain (Castilian)		White	1880-1886; 1898-1904
10°	Miguel Juárez Celman	Spain (Castilian)	(Republic of Ireland) Ireland (Irish)		White	1886-1890
11°	Carlos Pellegrini Bevans	Italy (Italian)	England (Welsh)		White	1890-1892
12°	Luis Sáenz Peña Dávila	(Basque Country (autonomous community)) Euskadi (Basque)	Spain (Castilian)	Spain (Galician)	White	1892-1895
13°	José Evaristo Uriburu y Álvarez de Arenales	(Basque Country (autonomous community)) Euskadi (Basque)	Spain (Castilian)		White	1895-1898
14°	Manuel Quintana y Sáenz de Gaona	Spain (Castilian)	(Basque Country (autonomous community)) Euskadi (Basque)		White	1904-1906
15°	José Figueroa Alcorta	Spain (Galician)	(Basque Country (autonomous community)) Euskadi (Basque)		White	1906-1910
16°	Roque Sáenz Peña Lahitte	(Basque Country (autonomous community)) Euskadi (Basque)	Spain (Castilian)	France (French)	White	1910-1914
17°	Victorino de la Plaza y Palacios	Spain (Castilian)	Spain (Castilian)		White	1914-1916
18°	Hipólito Yrigoyen	(Basque Country (autonomous community)) Euskadi (Basque)			White	1916-1922; 1928-1930
19°	Marcelo T. de Alvear Pacheco	Spain (Castilian)	Spain (Castilian)		White	1922-1928
20°	José Félix Uriburu	(Basque Country (autonomous community)) Euskadi (Basque)			White	1930-1932
21°	Agustín Pedro Justo Rolón	Spain (Castilian)	Spain (Castilian)		White	1932-1938
22°	Roberto Marcelino Ortiz Lizardi	Spain (Castilian)	(Basque Country (autonomous community)) Euskadi (Basque)		White	1938-1942
23°	Ramón S. Castillo Barrionuevo	Spain (Castilian)	Spain (Castilian)		White	1942-1943
°	Arturo Rawson Corbalán	England (English)	Spain (Castilian)		White	1943
24°	Pedro Pablo Ramírez Menchaca	Spain (Castilian)	(Basque Country (autonomous community)) Euskadi (Basque)		White	1943-1944
25°	Edelmiro Julián Farrell Plaul	(Republic of Ireland) Ireland (Irish)	Germany (German)		White	1946-1952
26°	Juan Domingo Perón Sosa	France (French)	Spain (Castilian)		White (Note: In Argentina, someone of predominantly European or Levantine descent is considered white, including those with moderate Indigenous ancestry and predominantly white ancestry. In Perón's case, he had light skin and distinctly Mediterranean Caucasian features, which fits the Argentine concept of whiteness.)	1946-1955; 1973-1974
27°	Eduardo Lonardi Doucet	Italy (Venetian)	France (French)		White	1955
28°	Pedro Eugenio Aramburu Silveti	(Basque Country (autonomous community)) Euskadi (Basque)	(Basque Country (autonomous community)) Euskadi (Basque)		White	1955-1958
29°	Arturo Frondizi Ércoli	Italy (Italian)	Italy (Italian)		White	1958-1962
30°	José María Guido Cibeira	Italy (Italian)	Spain (Galician)		White	1962-1963
31°	Arturo Umberto Illia Francesconi	Italy (Friulian)	Italy (Italian)		White	1963-1966
32°	Juan Carlos Onganía Carballo	Italy (Lombard)	Spain (Galician)		White	1966-1970
33°	Roberto Marcelo Levingston Laborda	Scotland (Scots)	Spain (Castilian)		White	1970-1971
34°	Alejandro Agustín Lanusse Gelly	France (Occitan)	England (English)		White	1971-1973
35°	Héctor José Cámpora Demaestre	Italy (Italian)	France (French)		White	1973
36°	Raúl Alberto Lastiri	(Basque Country (autonomous community)) Euskadi (Basque)			White	1973
37°	María Estela Martínez Cartas	Spain (Castilian)	Spain (Castilian)		White	1974-1976
38°	Jorge Rafael Videla	Spain (Castilian)			White	1976-1981
39°	Roberto Eduardo Viola Prevedini	Italy (Italian)	Italy (Italian)		White	1981
40°	Leopoldo Fortunato Galtieri Castelli	Italy (Italian)	Italy (Italian)		White	1981-1982
41°	Reynaldo Bignone Ramayón	Italy (Italian)	Spain (Castilian)		White	1982-1983
42°	Raúl Ricardo Alfonsín Foulkes	Spain (Castilian)	Wales (Welsh)		White	1983-1989
43°	Carlos Saúl Menem Akil	Syria (Arabic)	Syria (Arabic)		White	1989-1999
44°	Fernando de la Rúa	Spain (Galician)			White	1999-2021
45°	Adolfo Rodríguez Saá	Spain (Castilian)	Spain (Galician)		White	2001
46°	Eduardo Duhalde Maldonado	(Basque Country (autonomous community)) Euskadi (Basque)	Spain (Castilian)		White	2002-2003
47°	Néstor Kirchner Ostoić	Switzerland (German)	Croatia (Serbo-Croatian)		White	2003-2007
48°	Cristina Fernández	Spain (Castilian)			White	2007-2015
49°	Mauricio Macri	Italy (Italian)			White	2015-2019
50°	Alberto Fernández	Spain (Castilian)			White	2019-2023
51°	Javier Gerardo Milei	Italy (Sicilian)			White	2023-2027

== Immigration in recent times ==
Residency permits granted under the Patria Grande Plan, by country of origin.

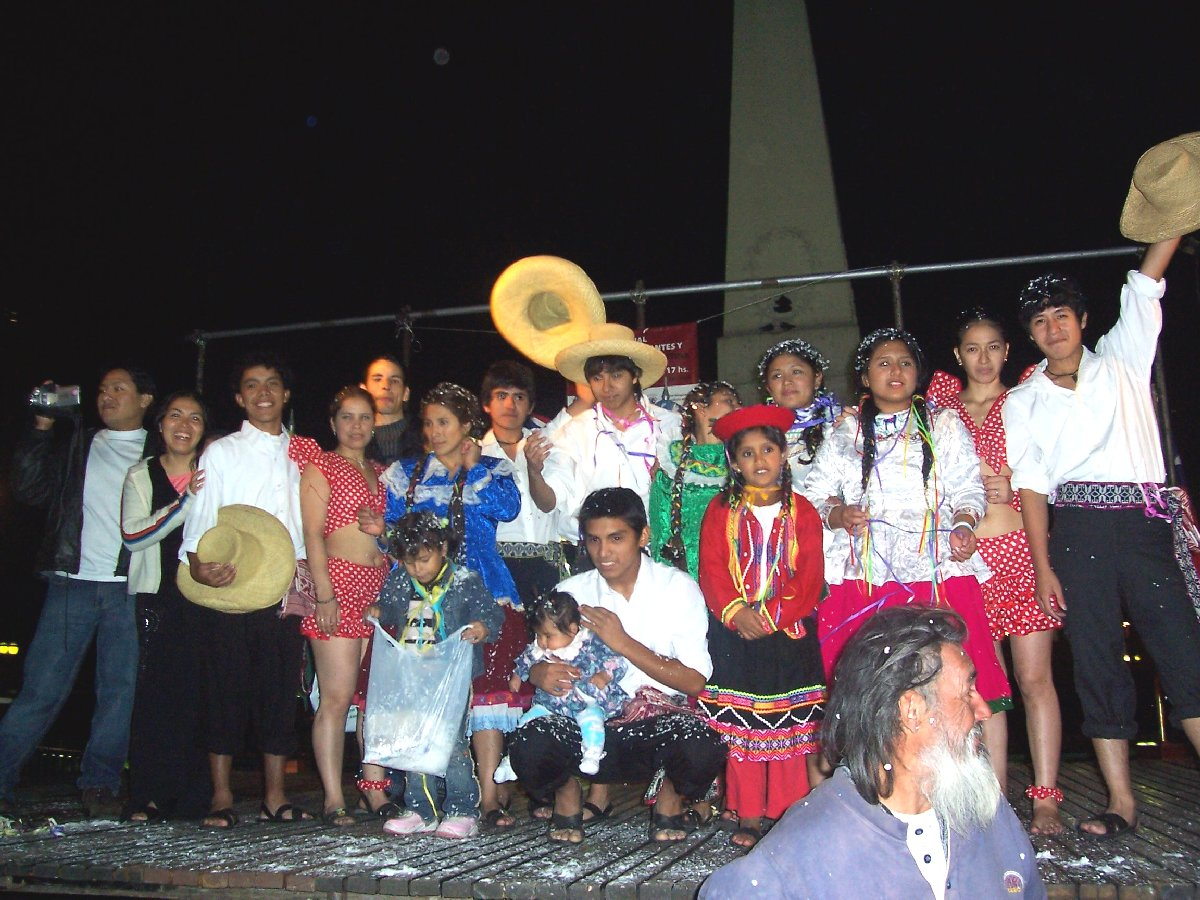
The First Tribunal of Migrant Women, primarily from Bolivia, Paraguay and Peru, held in the Plaza de Mayo, Buenos Aires in 2006.

Besides substantial immigration from neighboring countries during the middle and late 1990s, Argentina received significant numbers of people from Asian countries such as Korea (both North and South), China, Vietnam, Cambodia, and Japan who joined the previously existing Sino-Japanese communities in Buenos Aires. Despite the economic and financial crisis Argentina suffered at the start of the 21st century, people from all over the world continued arriving to the country, because of Argentina's immigration-friendly policies and high standard of living.

According to official data, between 1992 and 2003 an average of 13,187 people per year immigrated legally into Argentina. The government calculates that 504,000 people entered the country during the same period, giving about 345,000 undocumented immigrants. The same source gives a plausible total figure of 750,000 undocumented immigrants currently residing in Argentina.

From 2004 onwards, after Immigration Law 25871 was sanctioned, which makes the State responsible for guaranteeing access to health and education for immigrants, many foreigners have chosen Buenos Aires as their destination to work or study. Between 2006–2008 and 2012–2013 a relatively large group of Senegal nationals (4500 in total) have immigrated to Argentina, 90 percent of which have refugee status.

In April 2006, the national government started the Patria Grande plan to regularize the migratory situation of undocumented immigrants. The plan attempts to ease the bureaucratic process of getting documentation and residence papers, and is aimed at citizens of Mercosur countries and its associated states (Bolivia, Brazil, Chile, Colombia, Ecuador, Paraguay, Peru, Uruguay and Venezuela). The plan came after a scandal and a wave of indignation caused by fire in a Buenos Aires sweatshop, which revealed the widespread utilization of undocumented Bolivian immigrants as cheap labor force in inhumane conditions.

As of 2020, Argentina counted with a positive net migration rate (one of the only three such countries in the region, alongside Chile and Costa Rica) and remains a major destination for migrants within Latin America and the Caribbean.

However, since the start of the Russian invasion of Ukraine in 2022, in light of the international sanctions on Russian passports, Russian couples and pregnant Russian women have started to emigrate to Argentina in hopes of acquiring an Argentine passport in order to continue their journey onto Europe, or to permanently establish themselves in Argentina with their children. As of July 2023, more than 18,500 Russians have come to Argentina after Russia invaded Ukraine. Argentina does not require a visa for Russian citizens to enter the country as tourists and it also allows the parents of children born on Argentinian soil to receive residency, and, later, a passport. This opportunity has led to approximately 10,500 Russians travelling to Argentina to give birth in 2022.

== Country of birth of Argentine residents ==
Proportion of foreign South Americans in each department as of the 2022 Argentine census.

Immigrants by continent in 2022
1. America (81.1%)
2. Europe (7.50%)
3. Asia (1.90%)
4. Africa and Oceania (0.20%)
5. Unknown (9.30%)

According to the National Institute of Statistics and Census of Argentina, in 2022 a total of 1,933,463 of the Argentine resident population were born outside Argentina, representing 4.24% of the total Argentine resident population.

Argentina is home to the largest foreign-born population in the region (around 2 million migrants), mainly from neighbouring countries such as Paraguay and the Plurinational State of Bolivia.

Place	Country	2022	2010	2001	1991
1	Paraguay	522,598	550,713	325,046	254,115
2	Bolivia	338,299	345,272	233,464	145,670
3	Venezuela	161,495	6,379	2,774	1,934
4	Peru	156,251	157,514	88,260	15,939
5	Chile	149,082	191,147	212,429	247,987
6	Uruguay	95,384	116,592	117,564	135,406
7	Italy	68,169	147,499	216,718	356,923
8	Brazil	49,943	41,330	34,712	33,966
9	Spain	48,492	94,030	134,417	244,212
10	Colombia	46,482	17,576	3,876	2,638
11	China	18,629	8,929	4,184	2,297
12	United States	13,986	19,147	10,552	9,755
13	Ecuador	8,879	4,820	2,125	975
14	Dominican Republic	7,817	5,661	1,497	259
15	Mexico	5,833	6,042	3,323	2,277
16	South Korea	5,337	7,321	8,290	8,371
17	Germany	4,087	8,416	10,362	15,451
18	France	3,960	6,995	6,578	6,309
19	Cuba	3,921	3,461	2,457	1,393
20	Ukraine	3,486	4,830	8,290	3,498
21	Portugal	3,281	6,785	9,340	13,229
22	Taiwan	3,018	2,875	3,511	1,870
23	Japan	2,703	4,036	4,753	5,674
24	Russia	2,169	2,696	4,083	6,529
25	United Kingdom	1,840	3,029	2,418	2,334
26	Haiti	1,524	309	88	73
27	Poland	1,408	6,428	13,703	28,811
28	Israel	1,394	1,716	1,253	1,431
29	Canada	1,377	2,062	1,263	777
30	Syria	1,324	1,337	2,350	4,814
	Other / Unknown	201,295	31,010	62,260	73,293
TOTAL		1,933,463	1,805,957	1,531,940	1,628,210

== Genetic studies ==
Autosomal, patrilineal and matrilineal ancestry of Argentines (Corach et al., 2009)
Autosomal	NRY DNA (patrilineal)	mtDNA (matrilineal)
1. European contribution (78.6%); 2. Amerindian contribution (17.3%); 3. African contribution (4.10%)	1. European contribution (94.1%); 2. Amerindian contribution (4.90%); 3. African contribution (1.00%)	1. Amerindian contribution (53.7%); 2. European contribution (44.3%); 3. African contribution (2.00%)

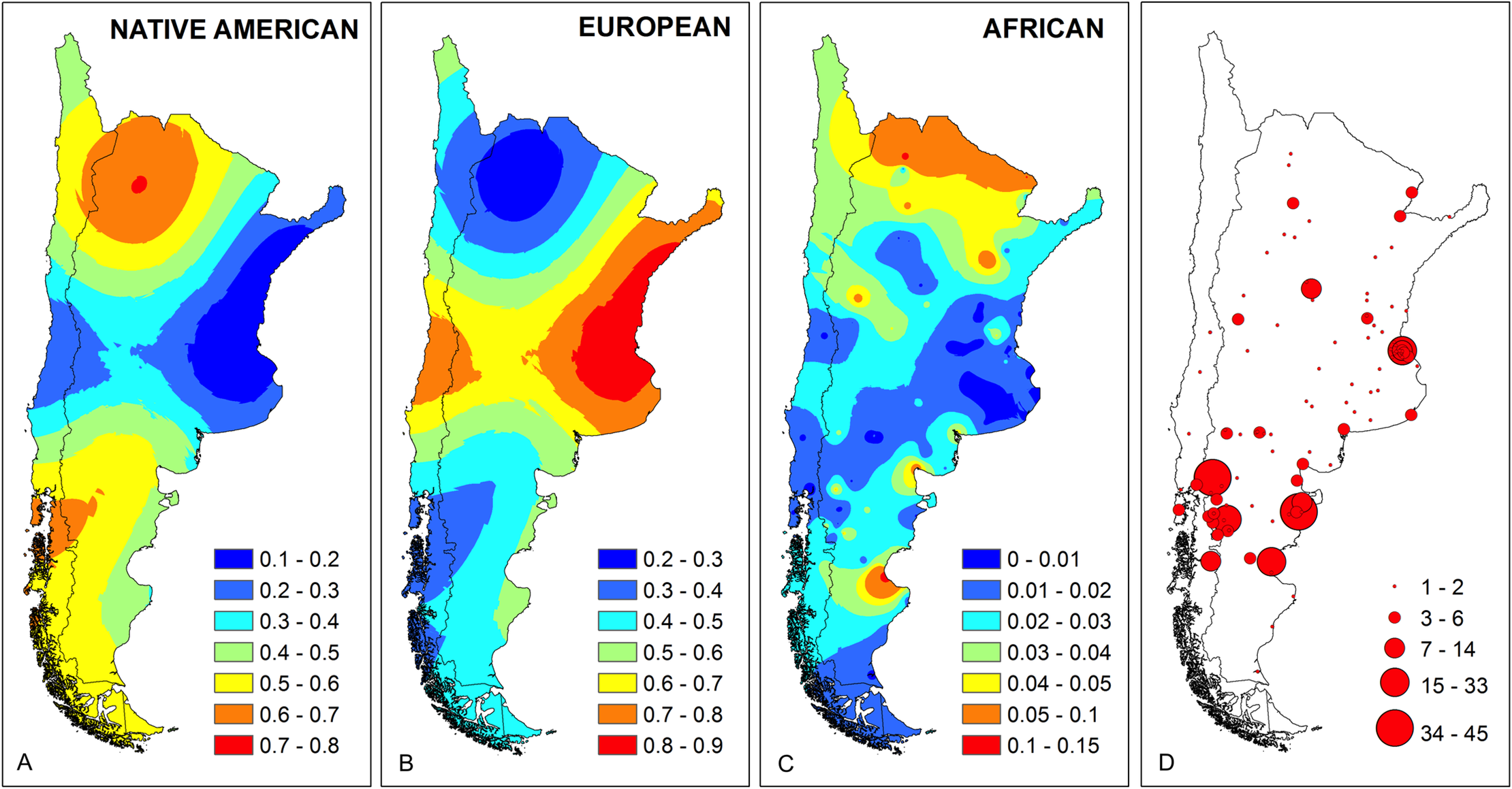
Genetic admixture in Argentina and Chile according to Parolin et al. (2019)

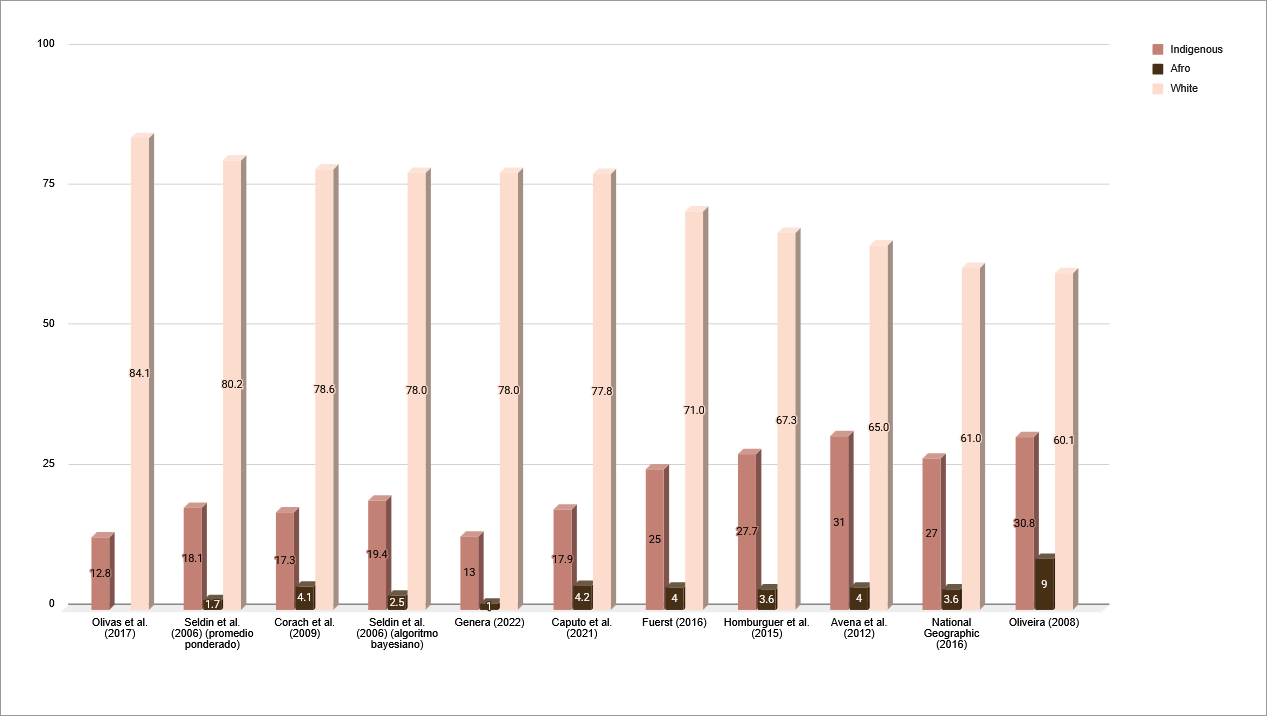
Genetic composition of Argentina according to different sources.

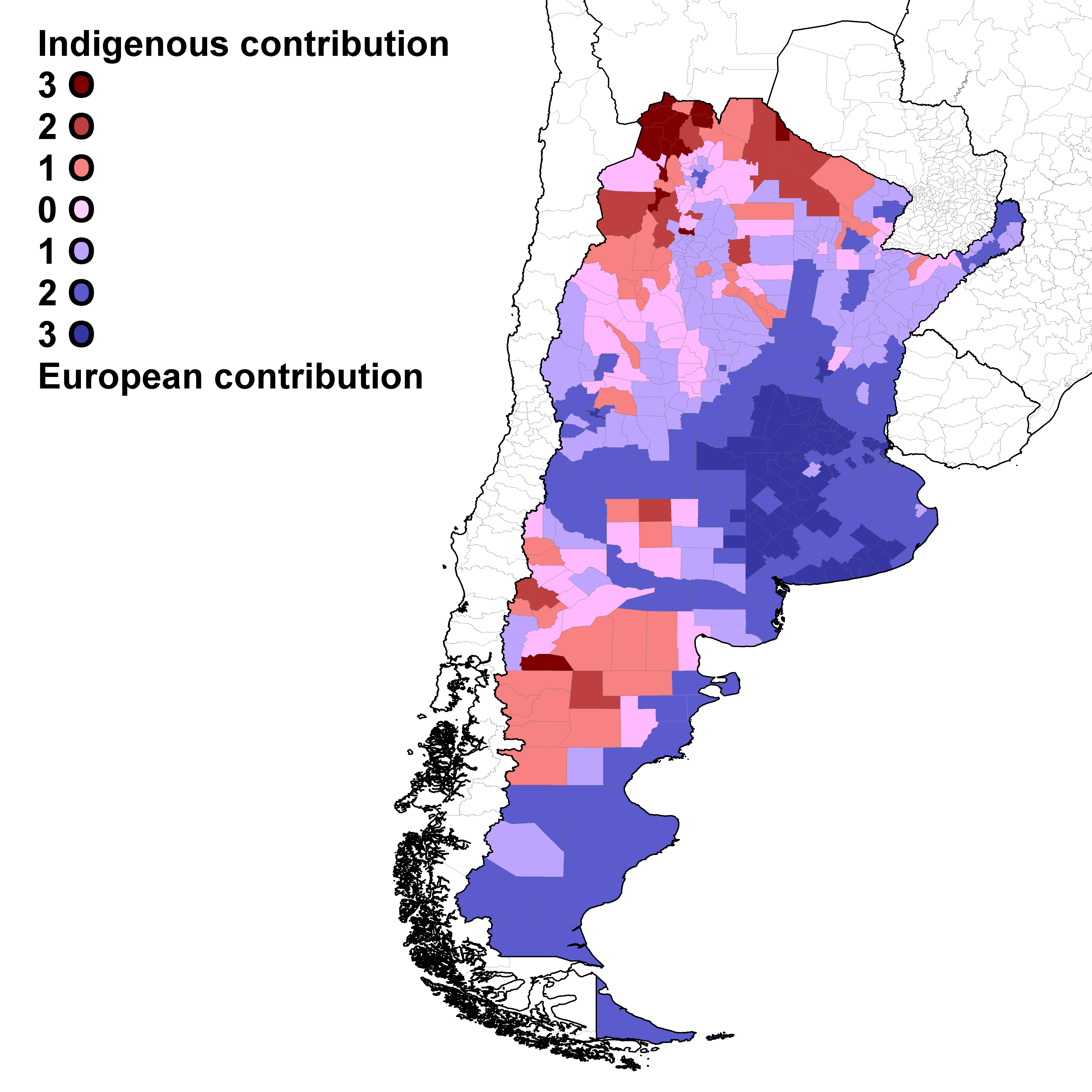
Proportion of European and indigenous ancestry in Argentina.

- In the work of Corach et al., 2009, the authors say that "Argentines carried a large fraction of European genetic heritage in their Y-chromosomal (94.1%) and autosomal (78.5%) DNA, but their mitochondrial gene pool is mostly of Native American ancestry (53.7%); instead, African heritage was small in all three genetic systems (<4%)".
- According to Caputo et al., 2021, the study of autosomal DIPs show that the genetic contribution is 77.8% European, 17.9% Amerindian and 4.2% African. The X-DIPs matrilineal show 52.9% European, 39.6% Amerindian, and 7.5% African.
- According to Seldin et al., 2006, American Journal of Physical Anthropology, the genetic structure of Argentina would be: 78.0% European, 19.4% Amerindian and 2.5% African. Using other methods it was found that it could be: 80.2% European, 18.1% Amerindian and 1.7% African.
- According to Olivas et al., 2017, Nature: 84,1% European and 12,8% Amerindian.
- Genera (2022): 85% Caucasian (74% European + 11% Middle East), 13% Amerindian and 1% African.
- Homburguer et al., 2015, PLOS One Genetics: 67.3% European, 27.7% Amerindian, 3.6% African and 1.4% Asian.
- Avena et al., 2012, PLOS One Genetics: 65% European, 31% Amerindian, and 4% African.
  - Buenos Aires Province: 76% European and 24% others.
  - South Zone (Chubut Province): 54% European and 46% others.
  - Northeast Zone (Misiones, Corrientes, Chaco & Formosa provinces): 54% European and 46% others.
  - Northwest Zone (Salta Province): 33% European and 67% others.
- Other studies indicate that the genetic composition between regions would be:
  - Central Zone: 81% European, 15% Amerindian and 4% African
  - South Zone: 68% European, 28% Amerindian and 4% African
  - Northeast Zone: 79% European, 17% Amerindian and 4% African
  - Northwest Zone: 55% European, 35% Amerindian and 10% African
- Parolin et al., (2019), found admixture in Argentine Patagonia was 62.1% European, 35.8% Amerindian and 2.1% African. Individuals with four grandparents from Central region had 85% of European admixture. Individuals with four grandparents from South and North regions had 71% and 61.9% of Amerindian admixture, respectively.
- According to the study by María Laura Catelli et al., 2011, the matrilineal Native American component observed in the urban populations was 66%, 41%, and 70% in South, Central, and North Argentina, respectively.
- According to Norma Pérez Martín, 2007, at least 56% of Argentines would have indigenous ancestry.
- Oliveira, 2008, on Universidade de Brasília: 60% European, 31% Amerindian and 9% African.

Genetic admixture across Argentine regions (Salzano et al., 2013)
Center	South	Northeast	Northwest
1. European contribution (81.0%); 2. Amerindian contribution (15.0%); 3. African contribution (4.00%)	1. European contribution (68.0%); 2. Amerindian contribution (28.0%); 3. African contribution (4.00%)	1. European contribution (79.0%); 2. Amerindian contribution (17.0%); 3. African contribution (4.00%)	1. European contribution (55.0%); 2. Amerindian contribution (35.0%); 3. African contribution (10.0%)

== See also ==
- Argentines
- History of Argentina
- Demographics of Argentina
- Culture of Argentina
- Southern Cone
- Languages of Argentina
- Rioplatense Spanish
- List of indigenous languages of Argentina
- Immigration to Argentina
- History of the Jews in Argentina
- Selkʼnam genocide
- Napalpí massacre
- Conquest of the Desert
- Religion in Argentina
- Islam in Argentina
