= Mestizo Argentines =

Ethnic group of Argentina

Argentinos mestizos (Spanish)
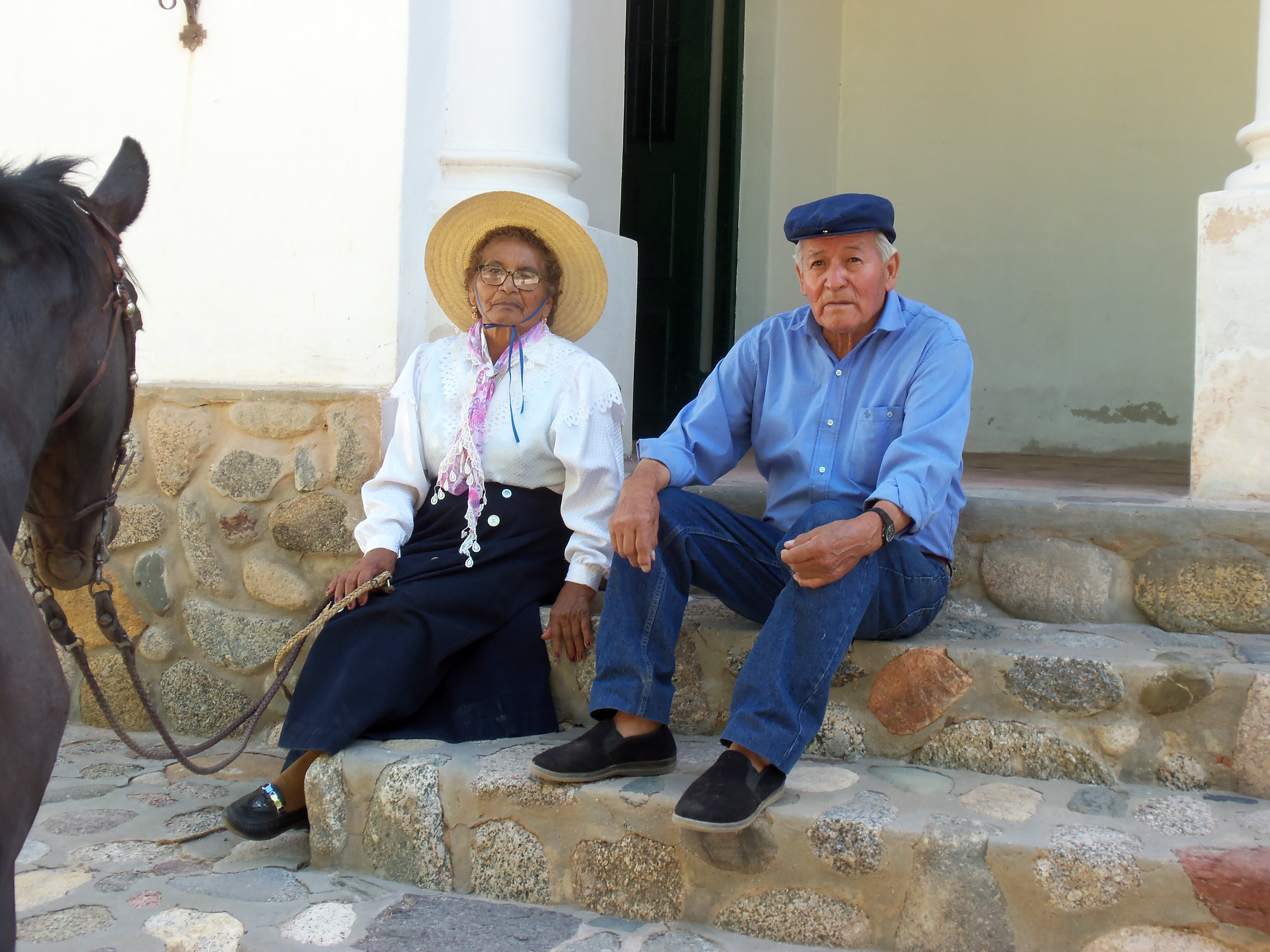
- Argentines during the 2010 patron saint festivities in Molinos, Salta

Total population
- Mixed ancestry predominates 7,600,000 (estimated); 16.3% of the Argentine population (30% or 56% have at least one Indigenous ancestor)

Regions with significant populations
- Mainly in the Northwest, Chaco, Formosa and in South American immigration areas

Languages
- Predominantly Spanish

Religion
- Majority: Catholicism; Minority: Evangelism · Irreligion

Related ethnic groups
- Mestizo Venezuelans · Mixed Mexicans · Pardo Brazilians · Mestizo Colombians · Mestizo Mexicans · Mixed Americans · Others

Mestizo Argentines (Spanish: Argentinos mestizos), also known as Mixed Argentines (Spanish: Argentinos de origen mixto), are Argentines who do not have a predominant ancestry due to their mixed origin, these stand out for having brown skin. These originated due to the miscegenation that occurred during the viceregal and post-independence period (mainly between whites and natives, rarely blacks as there are many fewer of them), this was classified under the colonial caste system, some terms that were used are Mestizo, Pardo, among other. Mestizo Argentines are currently the second largest group in the Argentine Republic, behind whites.

== History ==
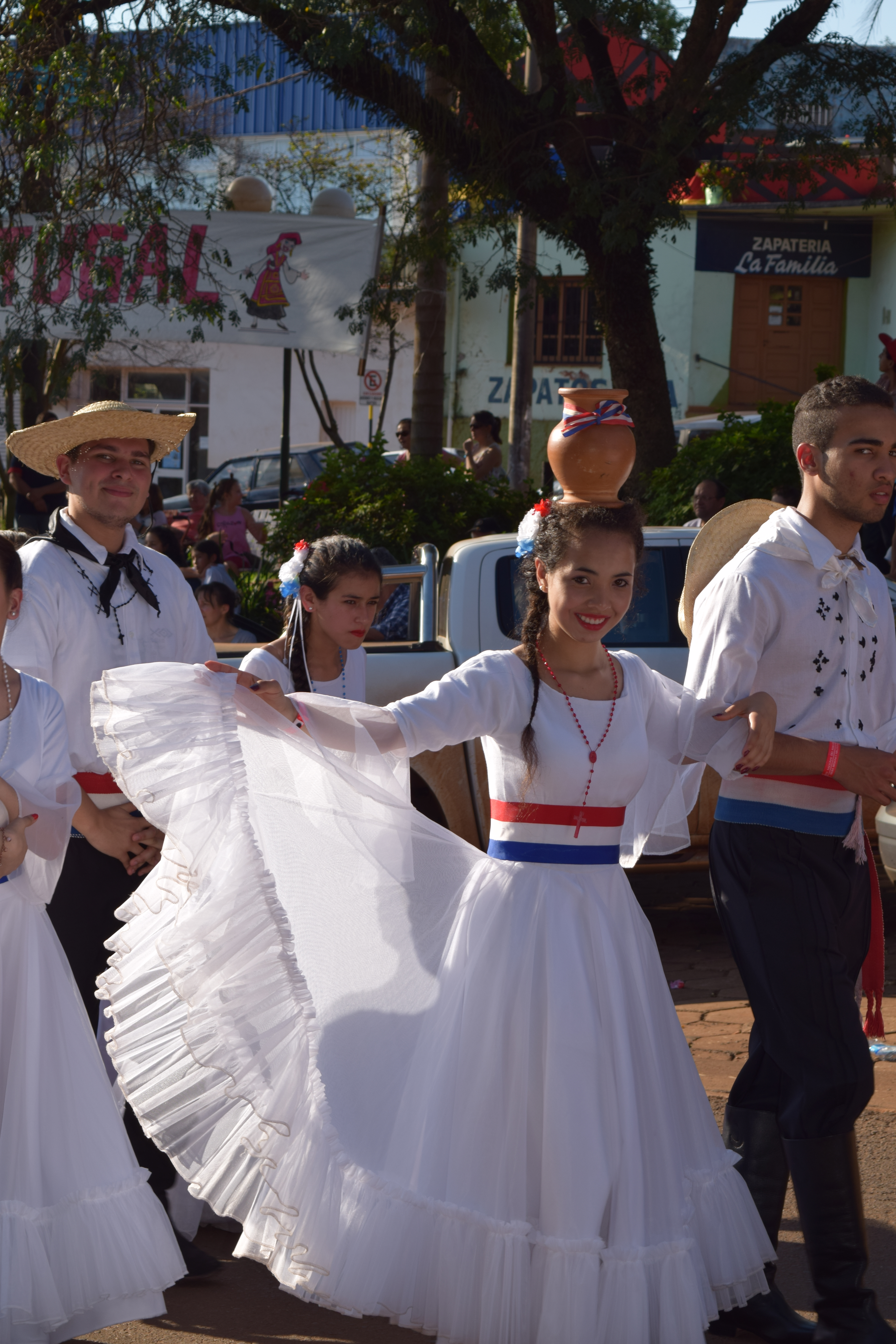
Paraguayan immigrants at the opening parade of the Immigrant's Festival.

Argentina had, like the rest of the viceroyalties, a mix between Spaniards, Amerindians and Sub-saharan Africans. Within the Viceroyalty of the Río de la Plata, the only region that had real value for the Spanish crown was Upper Peru due to the Potosí Mines, the current Argentine territory was mainly livestock so it did not have a strong economic interest and there was no important arrival of black slaves as in the rest of America, it was also always the least populated region of the Spanish Empire. Within the viceroyalty of the Río de la Palta, there is not a very marked caste system compared to other viceroyalties such as New Spain or New Granada, the most marked difference there was, was the difference in the political power that existed between those born In Spain with respect to the other castes, which generated displeasure, this was one of the several reasons why an independence sentiment was created.

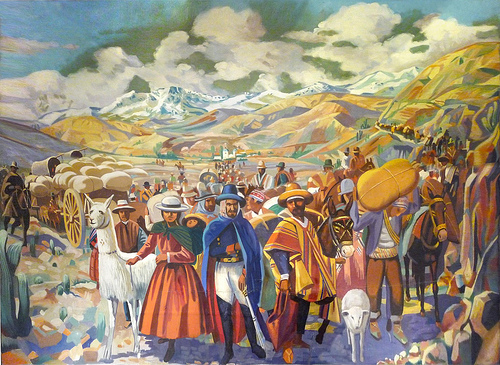
Portrait of the Jujuy Exodus.

During the Argentine War of Independence, the troops that fought were made up of Argentines of various origins (criollos, coyotes, mestizos, etc.), one of the most prominent was Sergeant Juan Bautista Cabral who sacrificed himself in the Battle of San Lorenzo to help Colonel José de San Martín whose horse had fallen during the combat. He was a Zambo since his father was an indigenous person of Guaraní origin and his mother was a black slave of Angolan origin. Another notable Argentine of mixed origin was Sergeant Major María Remedios del Valle, who accompanied the Army of the North as an auxiliary and combatant during the First Upper Peru campaign; she was listed in her military records as parda.

Mainly between 1880 and 1930 there was a great wave of immigration from Europe and the Levant, many of the Mestizo Argentines married and had children with the millions of immigrants who quickly became the majority, this caused much of the country to have a predominantly Spanish and Italian ancestry. Similar to Uruguay and White Brazil, the current face of Argentina has become overwhelmingly western in culture and tradition, although a few native traditions persist.

=== South American immigration ===
Residences granted in Argentina by country of origin since the presidency of Nestor Kirchner.

After the return to democracy in 1983, there was an increase in South American immigration (mainly Bolivian, Paraguayan and Peruvian) that settled mainly in the Villas Miseria (squatter settlement), around large cities and border cities such as Buenos Aires, Salta, Mendoza, San Salvador, Posadas, Córdoba, Formosa, Rosario, etc. These immigrants have a higher birth rate than the national average and over time brought cultural customs foreign to Argentina, such as cumbia villera (based on peruvian cumbia). According to the 2022 census, the Buenos Aires Metropolitan Area (AMBA) has a total of 1,159,446 immigrants in its territory, 59.96% of the entire country. This represents 8.29% of the entire AMBA population. More than 82% of the immigrants are of American origin, the main communities being: Paraguayans (32.46%), Bolivians (15.75%), Venezuelans (10.68%), Peruvians (9.16%) and Chileans (7.71%).

Due to the cultural shock and social problems generated by new immigrants and their descendants, such as crime, a feeling of xenophobia and rejection towards this group arose in Argentine society. A common term to refer to the descendants of Bolivians born in Argentina is "Boligaucho".

== Demographics ==
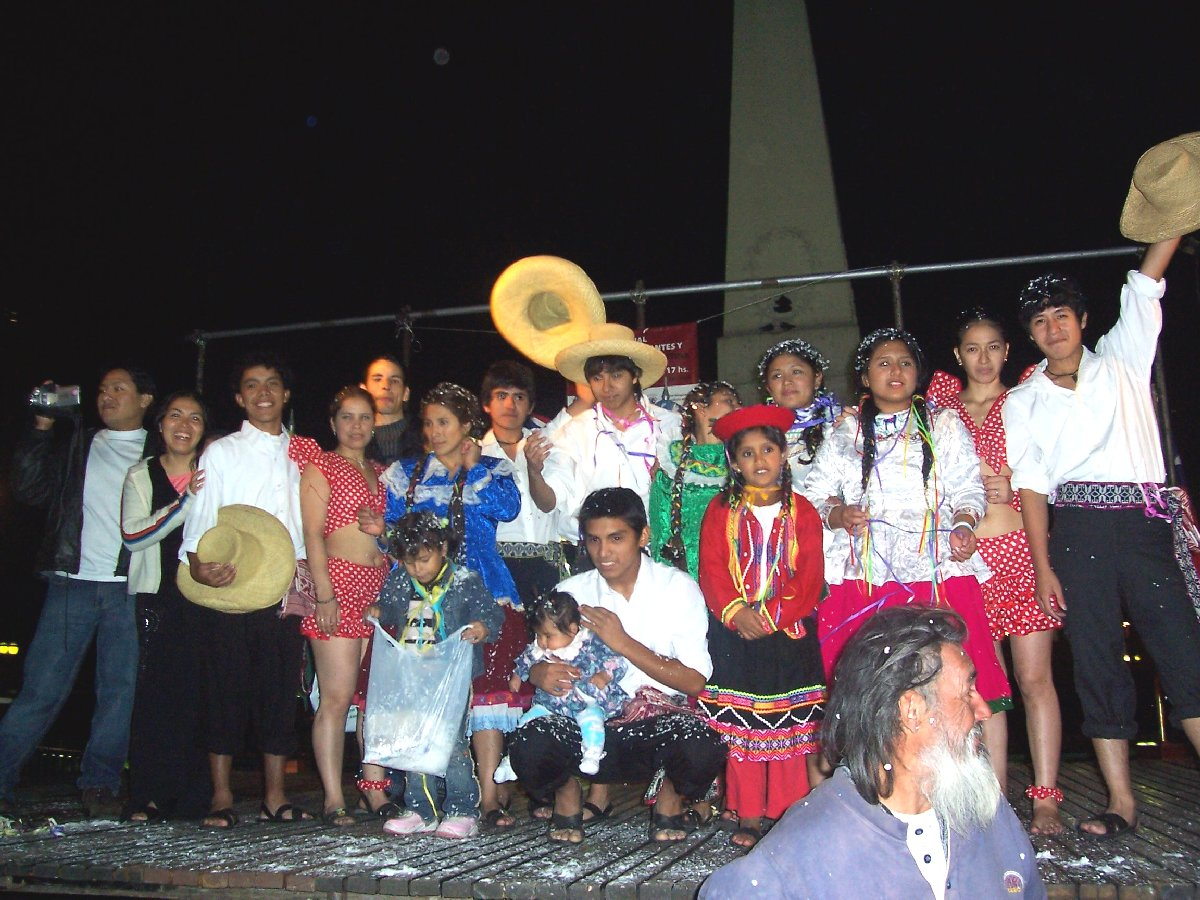
Folklore celebration of Bolivian, Peruvian and Paraguayan immigrants and children in Buenos Aires in 2006.

There is no official census data on the number of people in the Argentine Republic who do not have a predominant ancestry.

In 1778 a census was taken to find out the number of people who lived in the current Argentine area of the viceroyalty of the Río de la Plata. According to this census, Argentina only had 185,920 people, of which 3.31% (about 6,134 people) were mestizos (mixed Amerindians and Spaniards), the Afro-Mestizofs (mulattoes, zambos and pardos) despite also being mixed people, were not taken into account and were included as "Blacks" to simplify.

It is estimated that the percentage of argentines without a predominant ancestry increases in provinces that did not receive such notable immigration from Europe and the Levant, between 1880 and 1930 during the great immigration, these are mainly some of the provinces of the Argentine Northwest. A large percentage of mestizo people in Argentina today are immigrants and descendants from neighboring countries (primarily Bolivia, Paraguay, Peru, and Chile), most of whom have settled in Greater Buenos Aires and border cities.

== Genetic studies ==
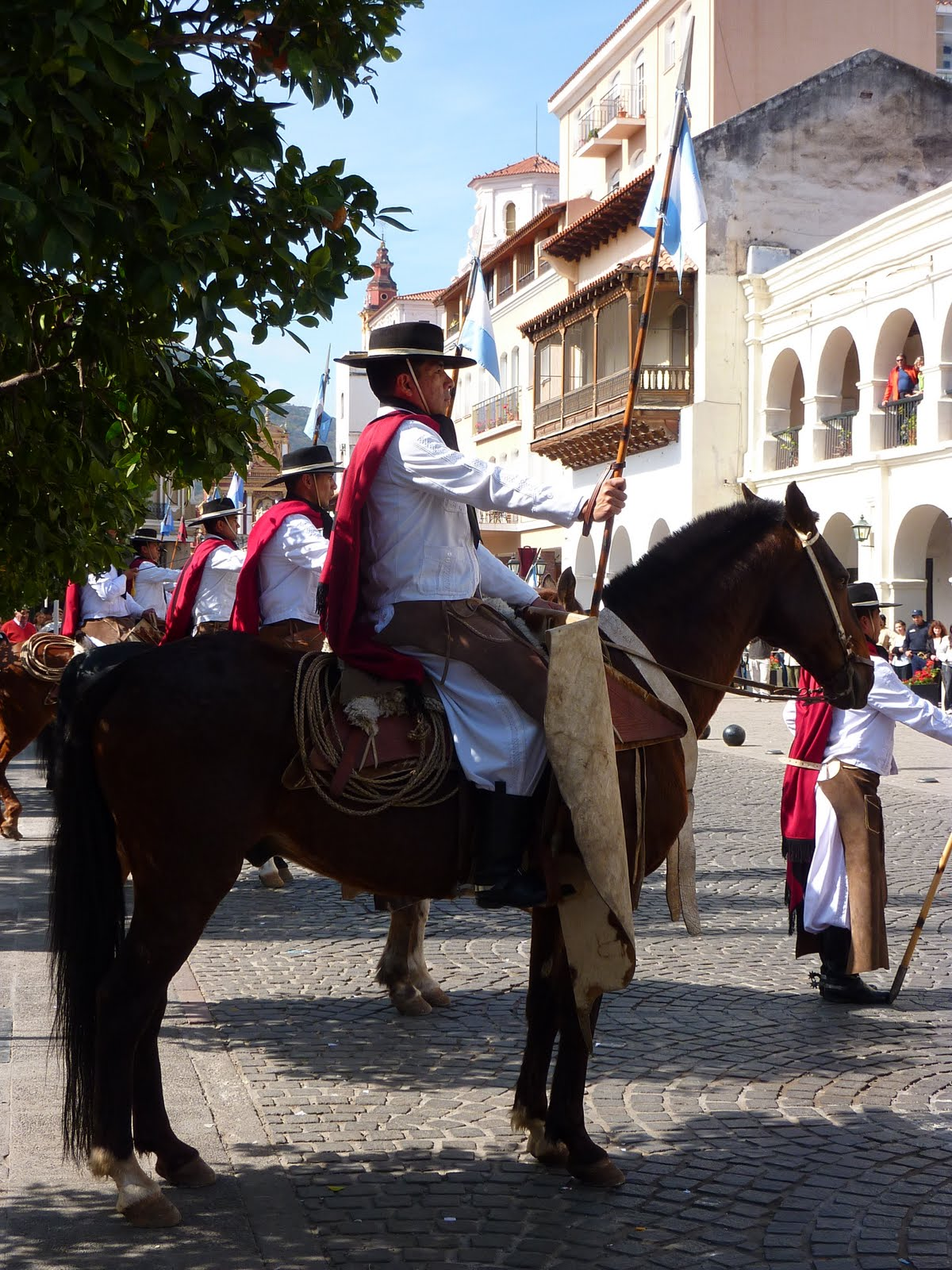
Gauchos in Salta, Argentina.

Large comprehensive studies across Argentina's many regions in order to characterize the genetic admixture have been lacking. Small sample size studies give the following composition. It is estimated that because in the mix between European and Levantine immigrants who were the majority and Argentines from that time who became a minority, it caused modern Argentines to have a predominantly Caucasian Mediterranean ancestry (mainly Spanish, Italian, Arab and South French) in the criollo or castizo range.

A team led by Daniel Corach conducted a study in 2009, analyzing 246 samples from eight provinces and three different regions of the country. The results were as follows: the analysis of Y-Chromosome DNA revealed a 94.1% of Caucasian contribution, and only 4.9% and 0.9% of Native American and Black African contribution, respectively. Mitochondrial DNA analysis again showed a great Amerindian contribution by maternal lineage, at 53.7%, with 44.3% of Caucasian contribution, and a 2% African contribution. The study of 24 autosomal markers also proved a large Caucasian contribution of 78.5%, against 17.3% of Amerindian and 4.2% Black African contributions.

Several studies found out that the Caucasian ancestry in Argentina comes mainly from the Iberian Peninsula and Italian Peninsula with a much lower contribution from Central Europe, Northern Europe, West Asia and North Africa. The Italian component appears strongest in the East and Center-West, while the Spanish influence dominates in the North East and North West.

== Notable Mestizo Argentines ==
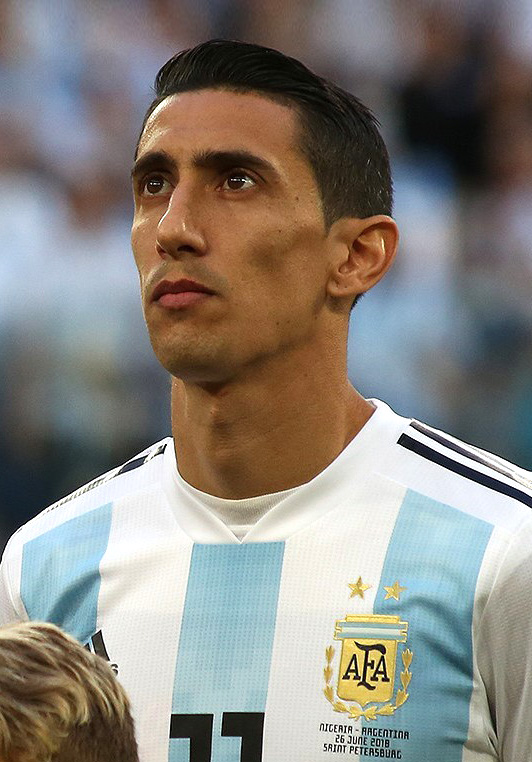
Ángel Di María, a professional footballer.

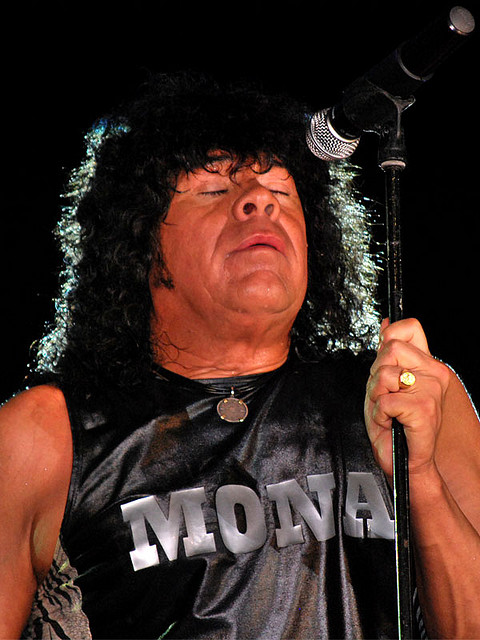
Juan Carlos Jiménez Rufino, an important cuarteto singer.

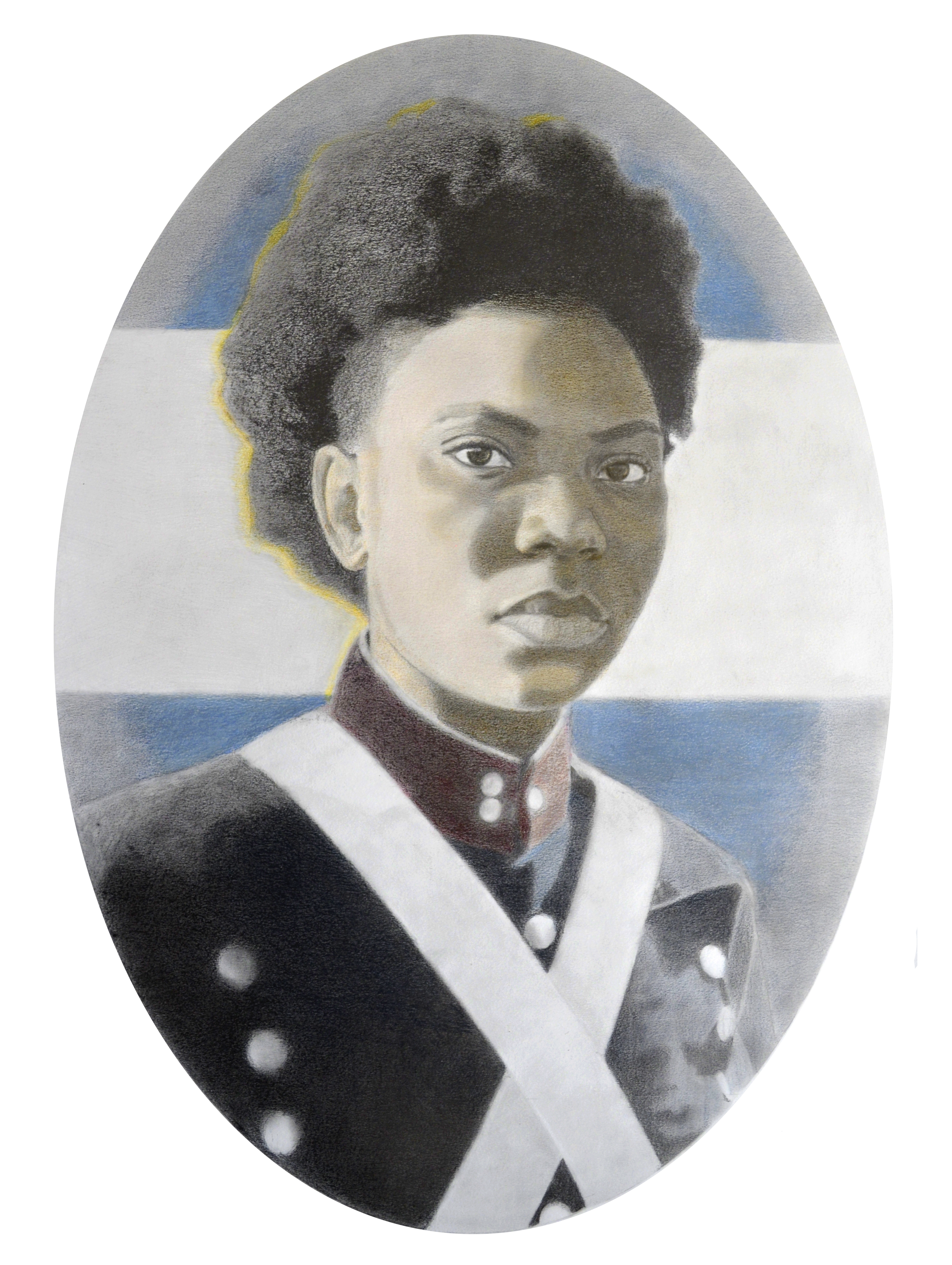
María Remedios del Valle, the Mother of the Homeland.

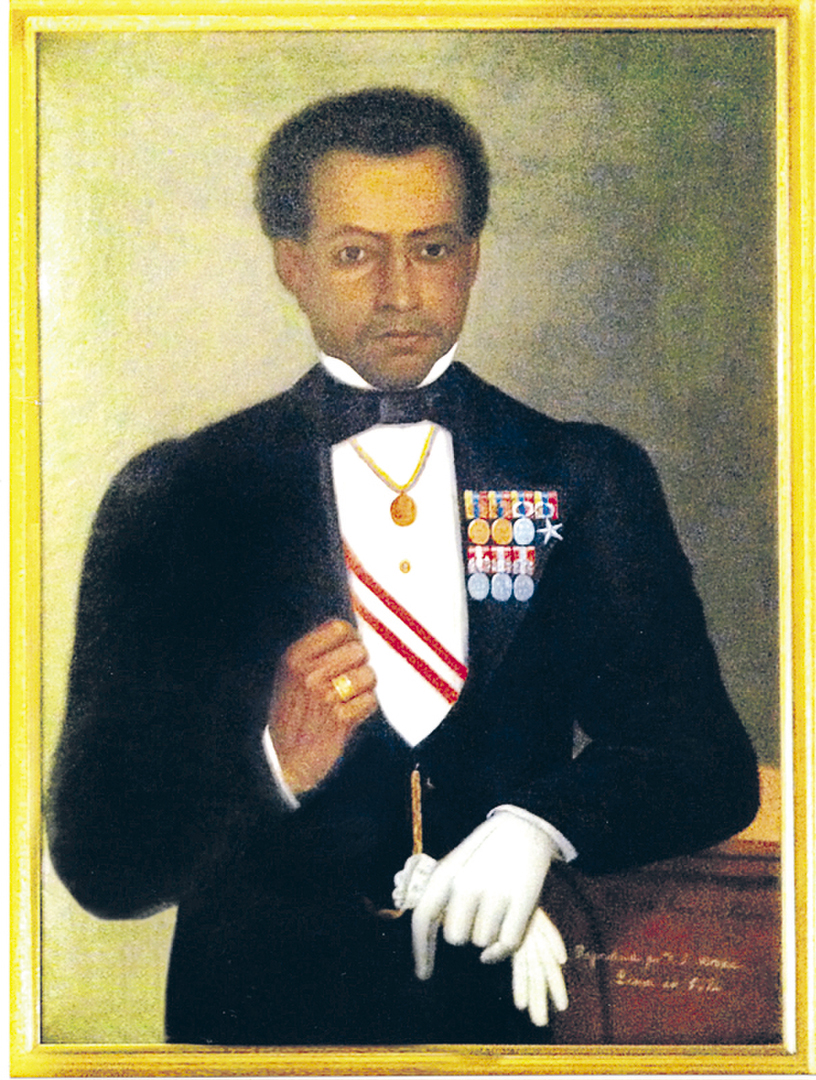
Bernardo de Monteagudo, a political activist and revolutionary.

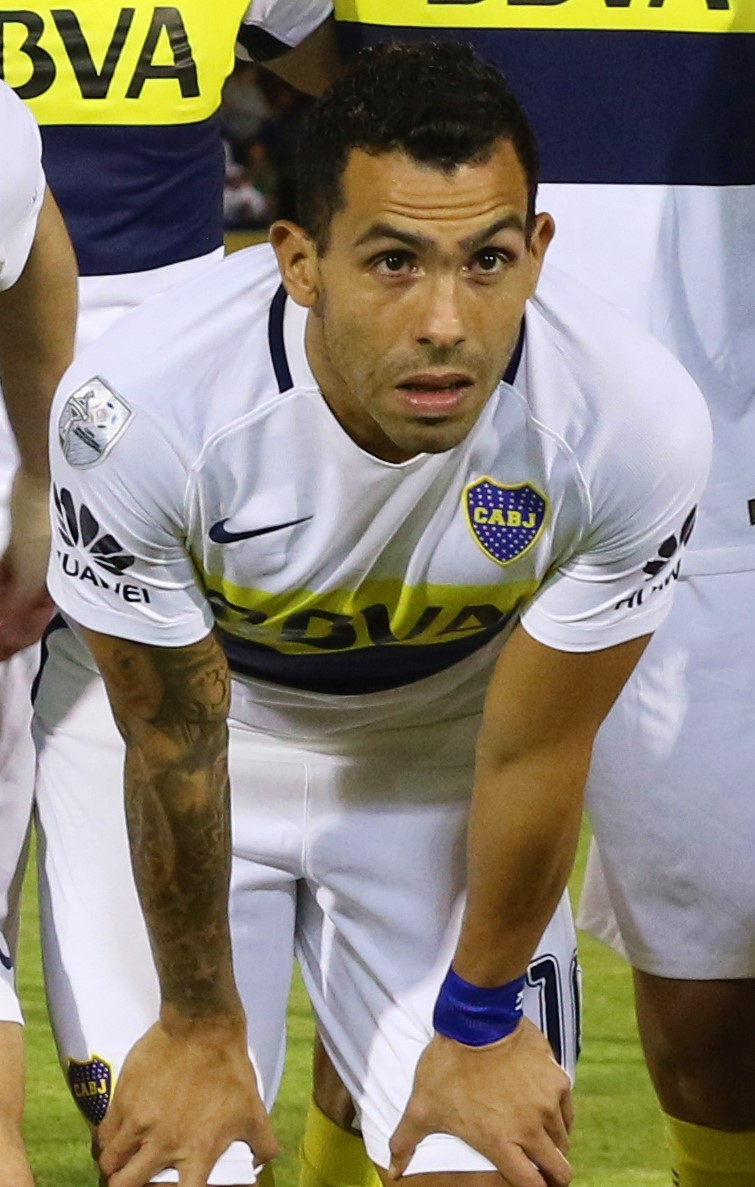
Carlos Tevez, a former professional footballer.

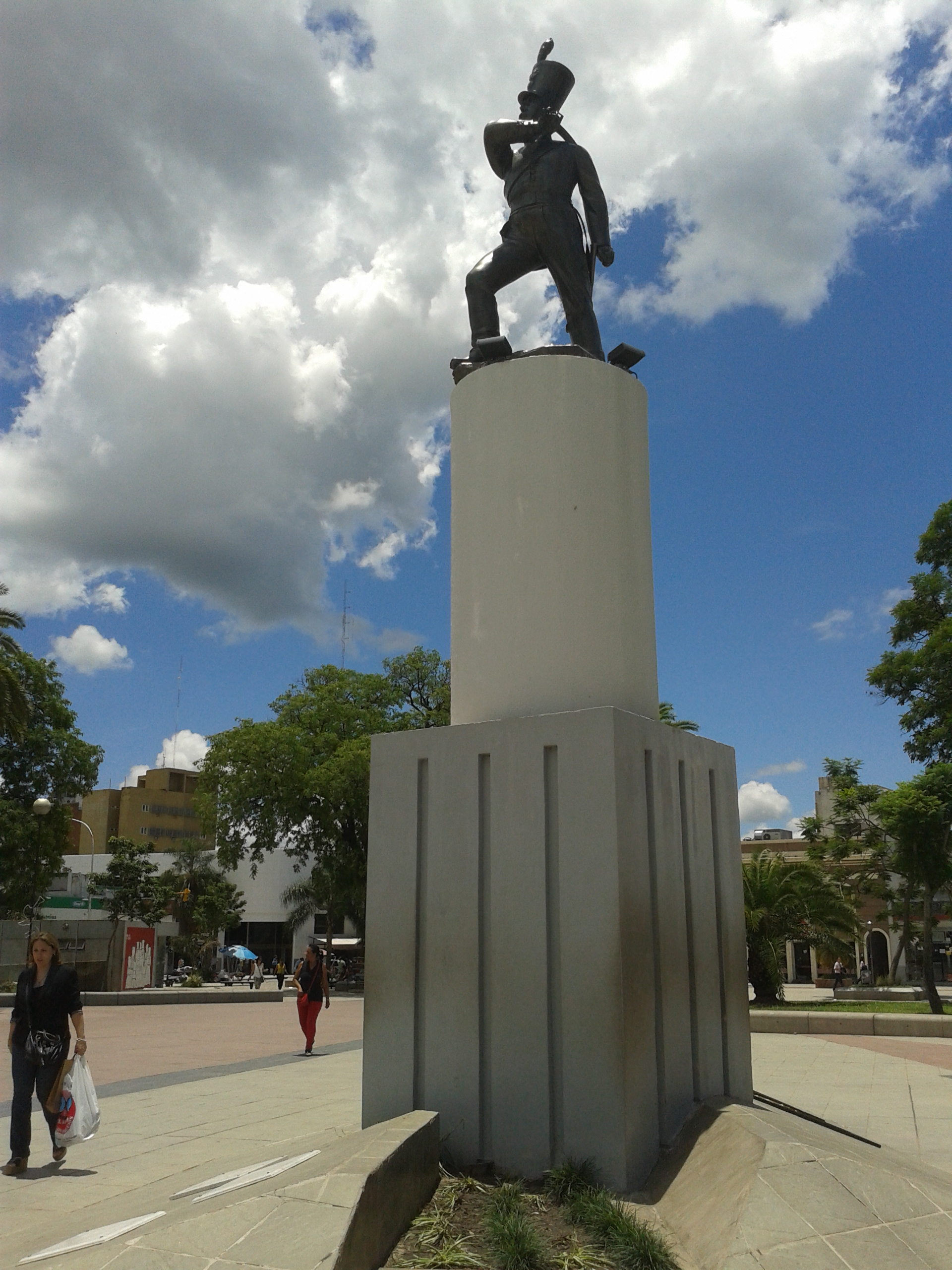
Juan Bautista Cabral, an Argentine soldier.

== See also ==
- Ethnic groups of Argentina
- Mixed people
- Brown people
- Colonial caste system
- European emigration
- Asian emigration
- Indigenous peoples
- African emigration
