= Peruvian Argentines =

Piruwnu Arhintinapi (Quechua) Peruano-argentinos (Spanish)
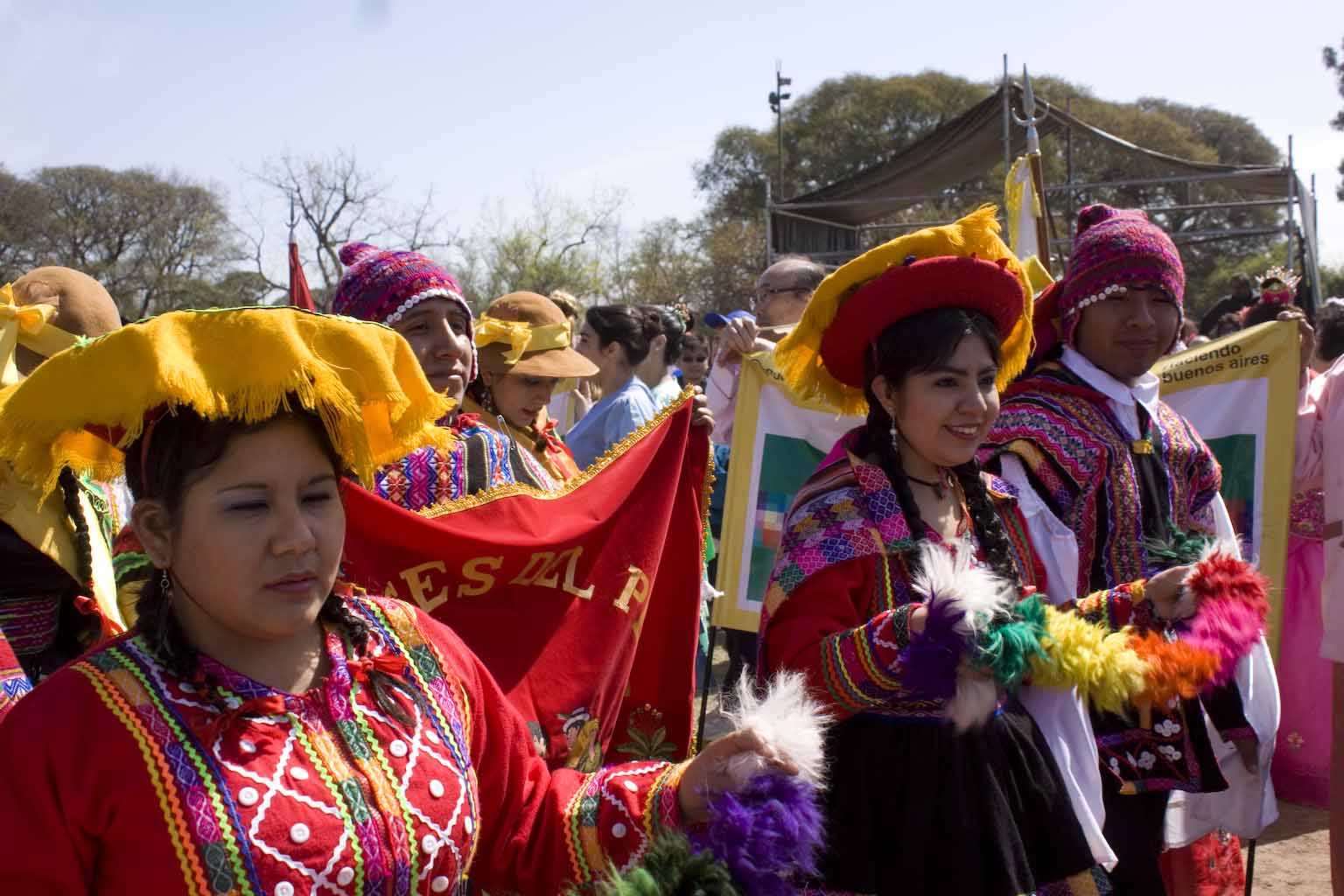
- Members of the Peruvian community during a Peruvian festival in Buenos Aires.

Total population
- 291,181 (by birth, 2023); 430,000 (2020); 0.95% of the Argentine population

Regions with significant populations
- Predominantly the Greater Buenos Aires, Córdoba and Mendoza

Languages
- Spanish; Quechua; Aymara

Religion
- Roman Catholicism

Related ethnic groups
- Peruvian Chileans; Peruvian Americans; Peruvian Spaniards; Peruvian Mexicans; Peruvian Japaneses

Peruvian Argentines (Quechua: Piruwnu Arhintinapi, Spanish: Peruano-argentinos) are Argentine citizens of partial or full Peruvian descent, or Peruvian citizens who have migrated to and settled in Argentina.

According to the 2010 national census, there were 157,514 Peruvians living in Argentina, making them one of the largest immigrant communities in the country; many more are descended from Peruvians but were born in Argentina, thus counting as full Argentine citizens. Argentina is home to the fourth largest Peruvian community worldwide, after the United States, Spain and Chile.

== History ==
The Peruvian-born population of Argentina has grown considerably since the 1980s. The 1980 national census registered 8,561 Peruvian-born residents in the country; that number had grown to 15,939 in 1991. The 2001 census registered 88,260 Peruvian-born residents, making up 5.8% of Argentina's immigrants and making them the seventh largest immigrant community in the country, behind Bolivians, Paraguayans, Chileans, Italians, Spaniards and Uruguayans. The following decade's national census registered another considerable jump, with 157,514 Peruvian-born residents in Argentina.

On 17 April 2006, President Néstor Kirchner launched the "Patria Grande" plan, an initiative to grant legal resident status to immigrants from Mercosur member states (including observer states such as Peru) with an irregular migration status. The policy was continued by Kirchner's successor, President Cristina Fernández de Kirchner. By 2010, of the 423,697 migrants registered in the programme, 47,455 were Peruvian-born.

Since 2007, the Peruvian Embassy in Argentina and the Buenos Aires City government have organised the yearly PerúBA festival, wherein members of the Peruvian community celebrate and share their cultural heritage, with shows of music, dance and food.

== Territorial distribution ==
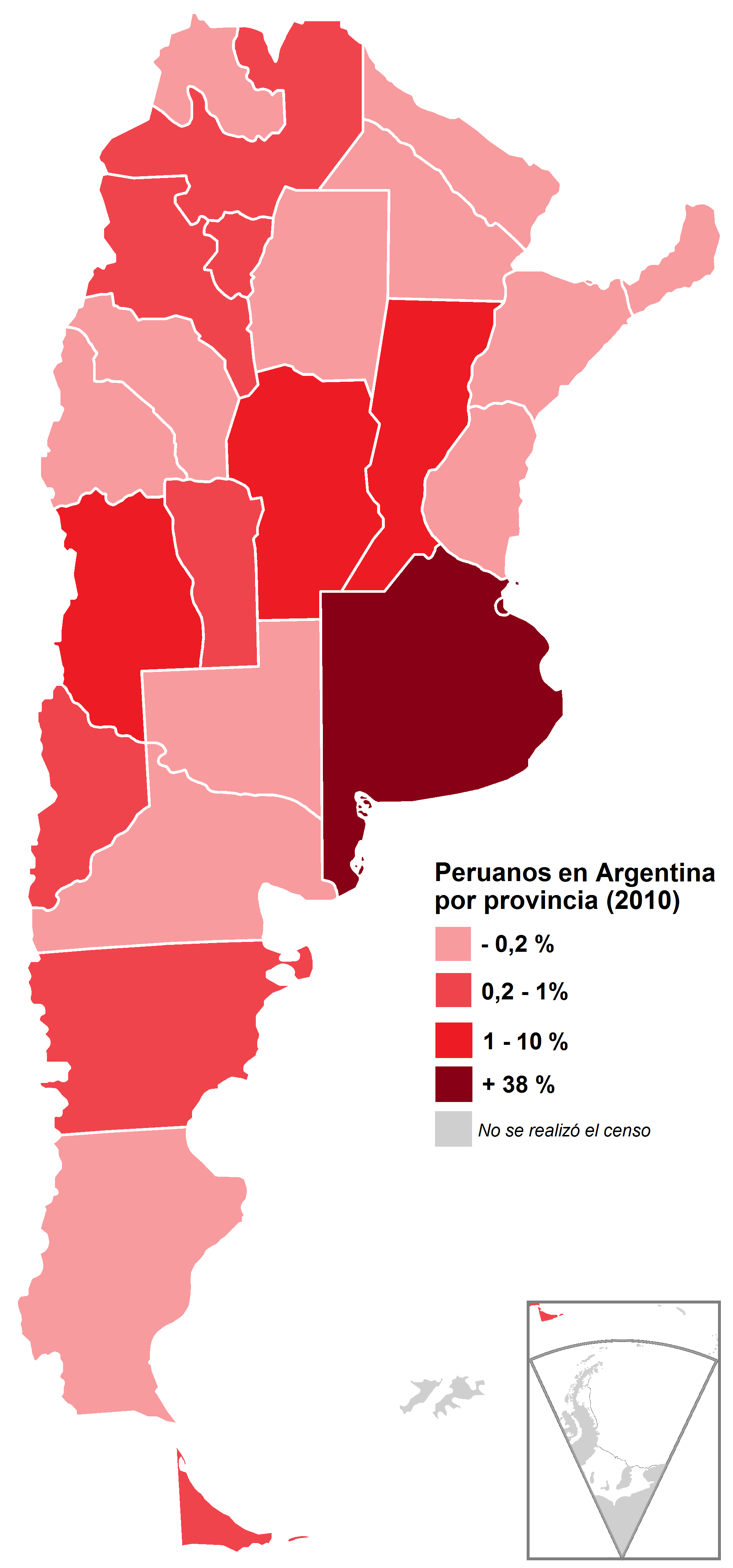
Percentage of Peruvian citizens in Argentina by province in 2010.

Peruvian-born residents and their descendants have primarily settled in large urban centers such as those of the Greater Buenos Aires conurbation, Córdoba, and Rosario. In Buenos Aires, the neighbourhoods of Balvanera and San Telmo are known for their considerable Peruvian communities.

The 2010 national census yielded the following results for the geographical distribution of Peruvian-born people living in Argentina:

#	Province	Peruvian-born people	
#	Province	#	%
1	Buenos Aires Province	69,395	44.05%
2	City of Buenos Aires	60,478	38.00%
3	(Córdoba Province, Argentina) Córdoba	12,442	7.90%
4	(Mendoza Province) Mendoza	5,360	3.40%
5	(Santa Fe Province) Santa Fe	4,010	2.54%
6	(Tucumán Province) Tucumán	1,013	0.64%
7	(Chubut Province) Chubut	564	0.39%
8	(San Luis Province) San Luis	431	0.27%
9	(Neuquén Province) Neuquén	376	0.24%
10	(Tierra del Fuego Province, Argentina) Tierra del Fuego	341	0.21%
11	(Salta Province) Salta	340	0.21%
12	(Santa Cruz Province, Argentina) Santa Cruz	321	0.20%
13	(Entre Ríos Province) Entre Ríos	294	0.18%
14	(La Rioja Province, Argentina) La Rioja	291	0.18%
15	(Río Negro Province) Río Negro	280	0.17%
16	(Jujuy Province) Jujuy	275	0.17%
17	(Catamarca Province) Catamarca	233	0.15%
18	(Santiago del Estero Province) Santiago del Estero	208	0.13%
19	(San Juan Province, Argentina) San Juan	205	0.13%
20	(Corrientes Province) Corrientes	187	0.12%
21	(Misiones Province) Misiones	156	0.10%
22	(Chaco Province) Chaco	142	0.09%
23	(La Pampa Province) La Pampa	100	0.06%
24	(Formosa Province) Formosa	72	0.04%
Total	Argentina	157,514	100%

Peruvians in Argentina according to INDEC and RENAPER

Year	Pop.	±% p.a.
1980	8,561	—
1991	15,939	+5.81%

Year	Pop.	±% p.a.
2001	88,260	+18.67%
2010	157,514	+6.65%

Year	Pop.	±% p.a.
2023	291,181	+4.84%

Source: The National Institute of Statistics and Censuses (INDEC) and the National Register of persons (RENAPER)

== Notable people ==
- Ignacio Álvarez Thomas (1787–1857), Independence-era military commander and politician
- Catriel Cabellos (born 2004), footballer
- Enrique Carreras (1925–1995), film director
- Teófilo Castillo (1857–1922), painter
- Nathalie Kelley (born 1984), actress
- Carolina Freyre (1844–1916), poet and novelist
- Helba Huara (1900–1986), dancer
- Carlos Huntley-Robertson (1908–1982), rugby union player
- Hugo Guerrero Marthineitz (1924–2010), journalist
- Clorinda Matto de Turner (1852–1909), writer
- Benjamín Ubierna (born 1991), footballer

== See also ==
- Argentina–Peru relations
- Immigration to Argentina
- Racism in Argentina
- Bolivian Argentines
- Venezuelan Argentines
