= Argentina–Venezuela relations =

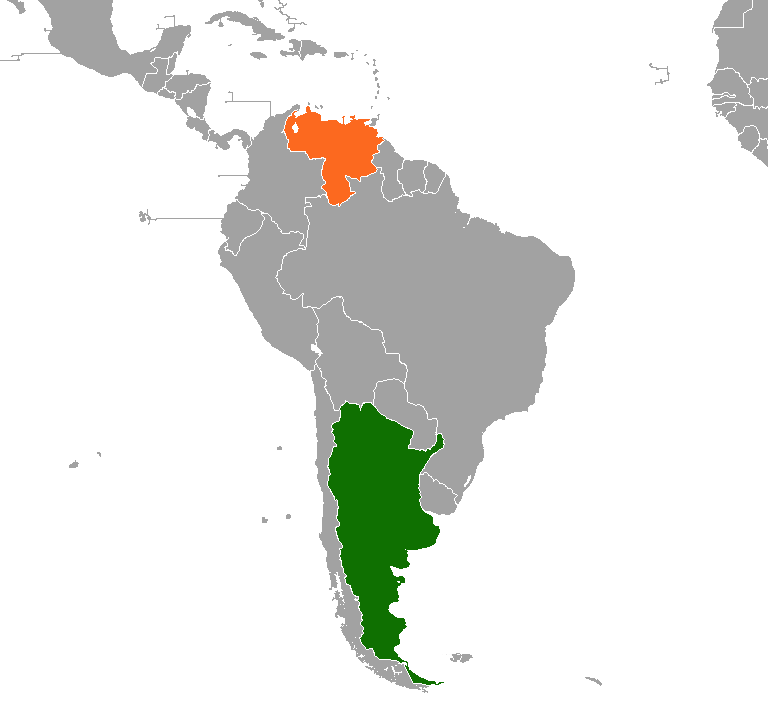
- Argentina: Venezuela

Diplomatic relations between the Argentine Republic and the Bolivarian Republic of Venezuela have existed for decades.

On 29 July 2024, Venezuela announced the breakdown of all diplomatic relations with Argentina, as because of the staunch stance of the Argentine government about fraud reports that occurred in 2024 Venezuelan presidential election, among critical differences between both leaders' ideologies Nicolas Maduro and Javier Milei.

== History ==
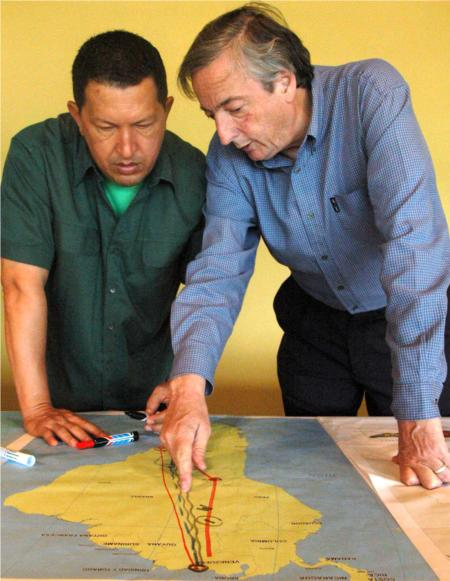
Presidents Hugo Chávez of Venezuela and Néstor Kirchner of Argentina, 2005

US$1.4 billion was traded between Argentina and Venezuela during 2008.

Venezuelan President Hugo Chávez met Argentine President Cristina Fernández de Kirchner in Caracas on 11 August 2009. Kirchner called it a "bilateral meeting [...] aimed at deepening our vital integration." The two presidents signed deals intended to see Venezuela import leather, machinery and poultry from Argentina, whilst a rice importation agreement was described by the Argentine President as "the biggest ever in Argentina's history". The deals were said to be worth $1.1 billion. The meeting coincided with visits to Venezuela by dozens of Argentine businessmen.

In February 2024, a Venezuelan Boeing 747, belonging to Conviasa subsidiary Emtrasur, was seized from Argentina's Ezeiza International Airport in Buenos Aires and flown to Miami, sparking off a diplomatic crisis.

In March 2024, Argentina announced diplomatic actions against Venezuela after President Nicolás Maduro banned Argentine-licensed aircraft from accessing Venezuelan airspace amid increasing deteriorating relations between the two countries.

The siege of the Argentine Embassy in Venezuela was a blockade of the Argentine Embassy and ambassador's residence in Caracas. Movement into and out of the compound was restricted between July 30 to September 1, 2024, on September 7–8, 2024, and from November 23, 2024, to May 6, 2025. The siege was ordered by the government of Nicolás Maduro and is part of the Venezuelan post-electoral crisis. The cause of the siege was the entry of indicted Venezuelan opposition staff members into the ambassador's residence, where they were taking shelter.

In January 2026, Argentina's President Javier Milei praised the United States intervention in Venezuela and the capture of Venezuelan President Nicolás Maduro, declaring: “Freedom moves forward."

== Migration ==
During the 1970s and 1980s, a sizeable number of Argentines migrated to Venezuela, escaping the military dictatorship and the country's economic woes. Many of them later returned to Argentina on the onset of the Venezuelan economic crisis.

As a result of the Venezuelan crisis, millions of Venezuelans have fled their country, and many of them have settled in Argentina. As of 2021, there are 179,203 Venezuelans living in Argentina, most of whom migrated during the latter half of the 2010s. As of 2018, Venezuelans were the fourth-largest expat community in Argentina, behind Paraguayans, Bolivians and Chileans. According to IOM figures, Argentina granted 170,223 residency permits to Venezuelan citizens alone from 2018 to 2020, nearly twice as many as to Paraguayan citizens. This makes Venezuelans the fastest-growing expat community in the country.

== See also ==
- Venezuelan Argentines
- Gran Gasoducto del Sur
- Suitcase scandal
