= Murder of Fernando Báez Sosa =

2020 murder in Villa Gesell, Argentina

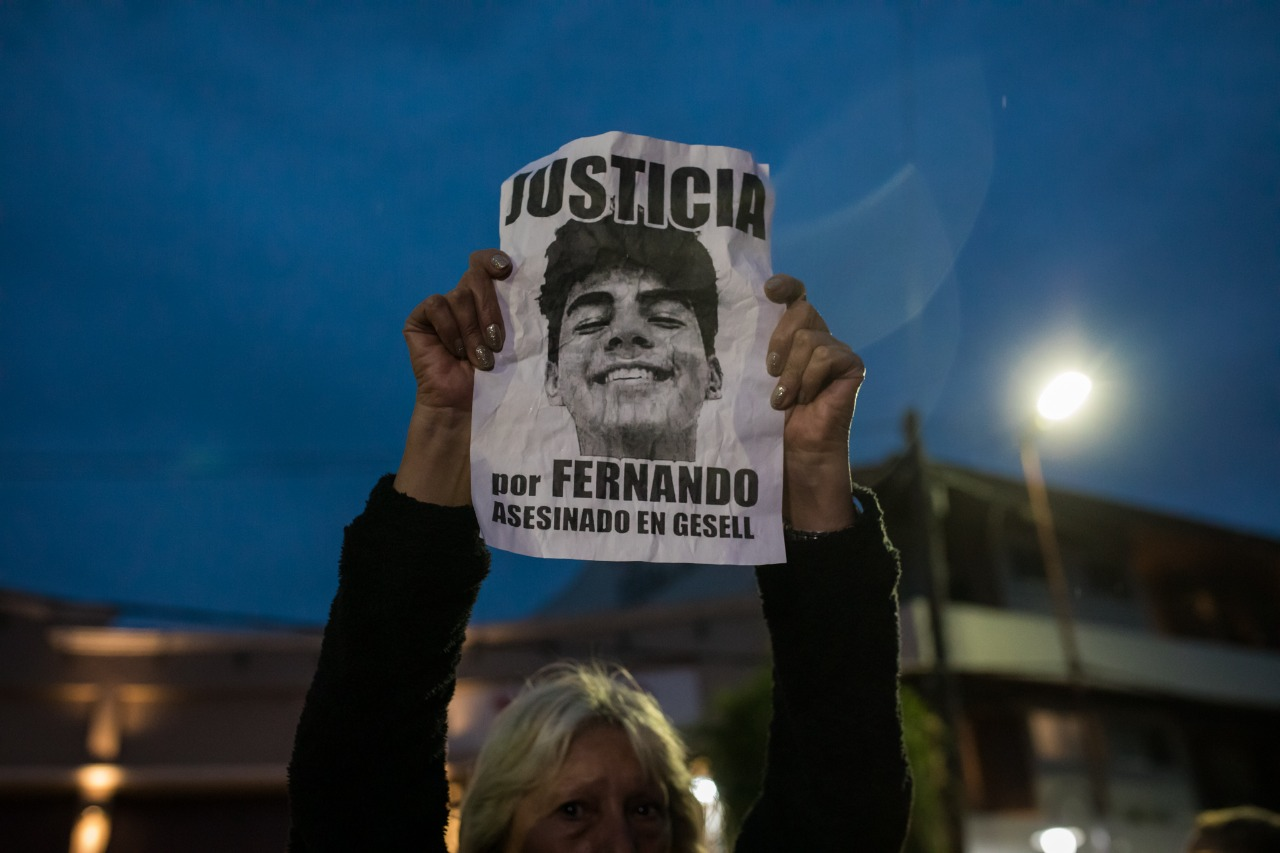
- Protestor with sign demanding justice for Báez Sosa's murder, January 2022
- Location: 37°15′S 56°59′W; Le Brique, Villa Gesell, Buenos Aires Province, Argentina
- Date: 18 January 2020 c. 4:44 a.m.
- Attack type: Murder by beating
- Victims: Fernando Báez Sosa, 18
- Perpetrators: Máximo Thomsen; Ciro Pertossi; Lucas Pertossi; Blas Cinalli; Matías Benicelli; Luciano Pertossi; Enzo Comelli; Ayrton Viollaz
- Charges: Doubly-aggravated homicide
- Verdict: All perpetrators guilty
- Convictions: Life imprisonment: Máximo Thomsen; Ciro Pertossi; Luciano Pertossi; Enzo Comelli; Matías Benicelli; 15 years in prison: Lucas Pertossi; Blas Cinalli; Ayrton Viollaz

Fernando José Báez Sosa (2 March 2001 – 18 January 2020), an 18-year old Argentine law student, was beaten to death at the Le Brique nightclub in Villa Gesell, Buenos Aires Province, on 18 January 2020 by a group of eight from Zárate, Buenos Aires. The case attracted significant nationwide media attention due to the violent nature of the crime and the extensive footage spread on social media. The murder has also been dubbed by Argentine media as the crime of Villa Gesell. (Note: Spanish: Crimen de los rugbiers and crimen de Villa Gesell.)

On 6 February 2023, the Tribunal Criminal N.° 1 de Dolores declared all eight men guilty of aggravated homicide, declaring five of them (Máximo Thomsen, Ciro Pertossi, Luciano Pertossi, Matías Benicelli, and Enzo Comelli) "co-perpetrators" and sentencing them to life imprisonment. The remaining three (Lucas Pertossi, Blas Cinalli and Ayrton Viollaz) were declared "secondary participants" and sentenced to 15 years in prison.

== Background ==
=== Fernando Báez Sosa ===
Fernando José Báez Sosa was born in Buenos Aires on 2 March 2001, the only son of Silvino Báez, a doorman, and Graciela Sosa, a hospice worker, both Paraguayan immigrants from Carapeguá. Fernando lived with his parents in the Recoleta neighbourhood of Buenos Aires. He attended the Marianistas de Caballito high school on a scholarship, as the family was unable to pay for the private school's expenses. Upon graduating from high school, Báez Sosa enrolled at the University of Buenos Aires to study law.

Báez Sosa was in a relationship with a fellow law student, Julieta Rossi. After his death, his wake was held at his former high school and his remains were later interred at Chacarita Cemetery.

=== The perpetrators ===
Eight people were convicted of Báez Sosa's murder: Matías Franco Benicelli (aged 20 at the time of the murder), Ciro Pertossi (aged 19), Luciano Pertossi (aged 18), Lucas Fidel Pertossi (aged 20), Máximo Pablo Thomsen (aged 20), Enzo Tomás Comelli (aged 19), Blas Cinalli (aged 18) and Ayrton Michael Viollaz (aged 20). Ciro and Luciano are brothers, Lucas is their cousin.

The eight were collectively dubbed by Argentine media as "the rugbiers", as nearly all of them played rugby union in the same club, Club Náutico Arsenal Zárate, in Zárate, Buenos Aires. Thomsen, dubbed as the group's "leader", was particularly gifted at the sport and played for Club Atlético San Isidro since 2017; local media had highlighted Thomsen's performance at the club and suggested he could one day play for the national team.

Another three members group, Juan Pedro Guarino (aged 19), Alejo Milanesi (aged 20), and a (previously unnamed) eleventh youth, have not been presented with charges by the prosecutor's office as of January 2023 due to lack of evidence that could implicate them in the attack. During the murder trial, the eleventh youth was identified as Tomás Collazo; his identity had been previously kept hidden as he had been 17 years old (and therefore, a minor) at the time of the attack. Collazo, whom the rest of the group called by his nickname, "Pipo", was not staying at the same apartment as the rest of them in Villa Gesell.

== The murder ==
Báez Sosa arrived at Villa Gesell, a popular summer destination in the Buenos Aires Atlantic coast, on Thursday, 16 January 2020. He intended to stay a few days in Villa Gesell with a group of high school friends and his girlfriend, Julieta. Báez Sosa's group stayed at the Hola Ola hostel on Paseo 105 and Avenida 5, in downtown Villa Gesell, where they intended to remain until 23 January.

On Saturday, 18 January, at approximately 1:30 a.m., Fernando and his friends arrived at Le Brique nightclub, on Avenida 3 and Calle 102. By 4:30 a.m. the venue was overcrowded, leading one of Fernando's friends to unwittingly bump against one of the attackers, which gave way to a verbal discussion between the two groups. The accused then incited the other group to fight, prompting the nightclub's security guards to expel the group, including Fernando and his friends.

After leaving the club, Fernando stayed alongside seven other friends outside the venue having ice cream while they waited for the rest of the group to leave. At 4:44 a.m., two of the perpetrators (Enzo Comelli and Ciro Pertossi) attacked Fernando and his friends. It is believed that eight out of the ten took part in the beating. They targeted Fernando, punching and kicking him until he was left unconscious; he suffered blunt trauma to his head. The group also attacked Fernando's friends, and stopped them from getting near Fernando. Overall, the attack lasted less than a minute.

According to the prosecutor in charge of the subsequent case, there was a premeditated co-operation to arrange the attack: some members of the group attacked Fernando, while others stood in guard to stop anyone from getting close and intervene. Lucas Pertossi filmed part of the attack on his cellphone, until he stopped recording to partake in the beating. In the video recording, Thomsen can be heard yelling at Báez Sosa, telling him to "stand up and fight". Another of the attackers, Benicelli, can be heard calling Báez Sosa a "negro de mierda".

=== Aftermath ===
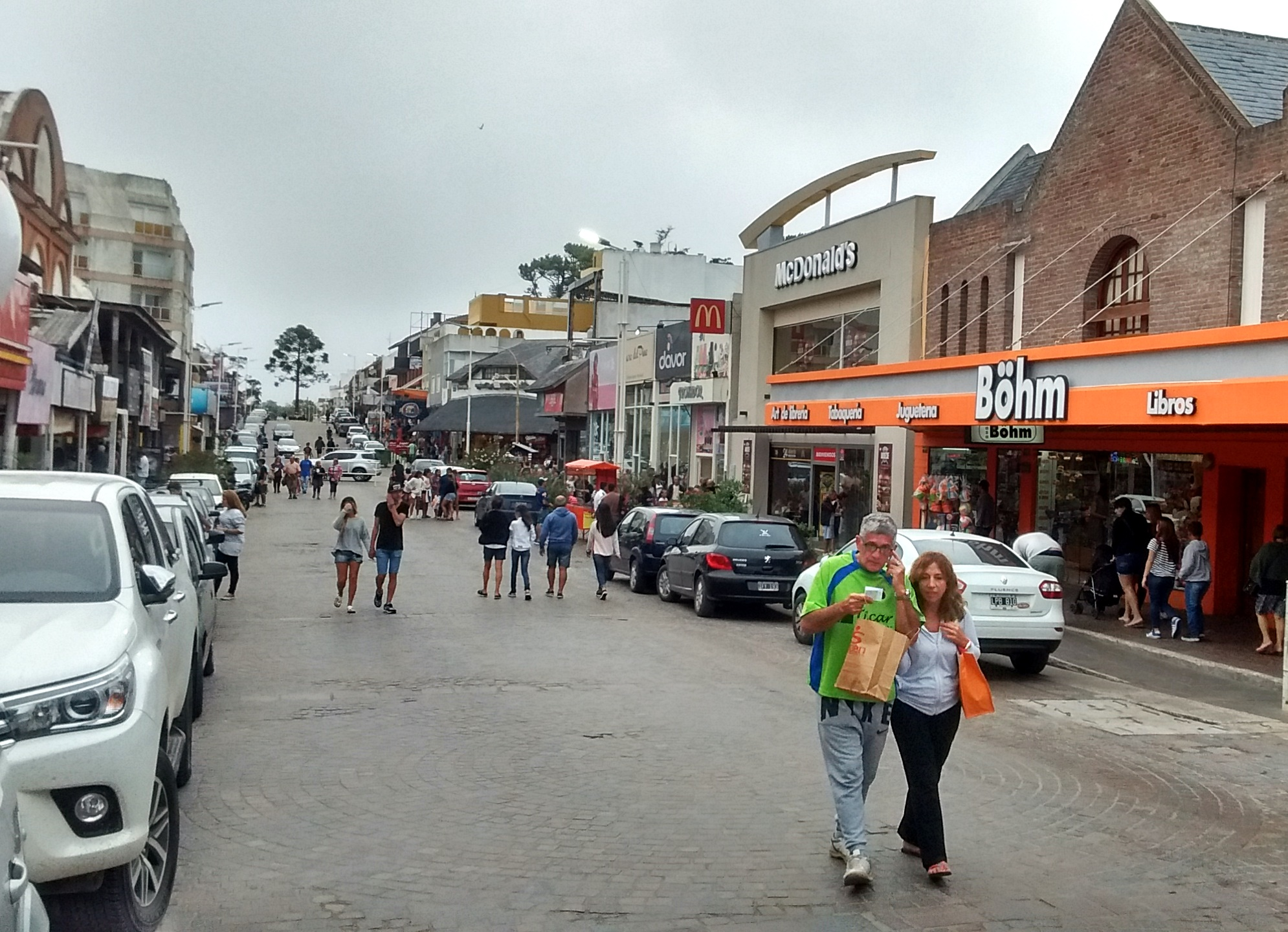
Avenida 3 in Villa Gesell. Pictured is the McDonald's which some of the alleged perpetrators patronized after the murder.

After the beating, the attackers returned to their hostel. According to eyewitnesses (including a nearby hotel employee), the group was heard loudly boasting of the attack. The group tidied themselves up, removing all traces of blood on them and changing their clothes. By 5:30 a.m., some of the group's members attended a local McDonald's near Le Brique.

Media attention centered on the perceived lack of empathy from the culprits in the direct aftermath of the attack. A selfie showing eight of them smiling at the camera taken only 20 minutes after the beating was extensively shared on social media; as well as group chat conversations in which Lucas Pertossi referred to Báez Sosa as having "expired".

At 10:38 a.m., all 10 members of the offender group were detained by the Provincial Police.

== Criminal procedure and trial ==
Upon being detained by the police, the suspects declined to speak at the Villa Gesell prosecutor's office. Five of them were then moved to neighboring Pinamar, while the rest remained at Gesell. The prosecutor's office gathered evidence from security cameras, witnesses, and the group's rented apartment, where the blood-stained clothes were found. The suspects' cellphones were also confiscated and sent to Mar del Plata for analysis, which led to the direct video recordings for the beating.

Báez Sosa's autopsy found he had succumbed to neurogenic shock, leading to internal bleeding from multiple hits. This made it difficult for the prosecutor's office to pinpoint whose specific hit provoked Báez Sosa's death.

Although the prosecutor's office initially pondered accusing the men of "group murder", as it was impossible to determine who delivered the final blow that killed Báez Sosa, the group was finally accused of "qualified premeditated homicide", the maximum sentence for which is life imprisonment. (Note: "Life imprisonment" (Spanish: prisión perpetua) can be shorted to a minimum duration of 35 years according to the Argentine Criminal Code, but only if the person was not found guilty of homicide or certain other offences laid out in article 14.) Two of them, Thomsen and Ciro Pertossi, were pointed out as co-perpetrators of the crime, while the remaining eight were accused of being "necessary participants". At that point, all ten were moved to Dolores Penitentiary.

On 10 February 2020, prosecutor Verónica Zamboni requested eight out of the ten men (Thomsen, Ciro Pertossi, Lucas Pertossi, Luciano Pertossi, Benicelli, Cinalli, Comelli and Viollaz) be held on remand, and asked for Milanesi (who had not been named by any witnesses during lineup) and Guarino (who had not taken part in the attack) to be released provisionally due to lack of evidence against them; they remained implicated in the trial on other charges until 7 April 2021, when all charges were dropped.

The trial against Thomsen, Ciro Pertossi, Lucas Pertossi, Luciano Pertossi, Benicelli, Cinalli, Comelli and Viollaz began on 2 January 2023 at the Tribunal Criminal N°1 de Dolores. Báez Sosa's parents were represented pro bono by celebrity lawyer Fernando Burlando. 130 witnesses were expected to testify. Initially expected for 31 January 2023, the verdict was announced on 6 February 2023.

=== False accusation against Pablo Ventura ===
After being detained by provincial police in the aftermath of Báez Sosa's murder, the accused pointed the blame for his death at Pablo Ventura, a 21-year old rower from Zárate and acquaintance of the group. Ventura had spent time in Villa Gesell alongside his family that January, but the family had returned to Zárate before the attack took place. The prosecutor in charge of the case, Verónica Zamboni, immediately put the accusation in doubt. Despite this, Ventura was briefly detained by the police and held for questioning before being released, clear of all charges, on 5 February 2020.

Further inspection on the offenders' cellphones found memes and insults targeting Ventura, suggesting a prior animosity from the group toward him. The Ventura family has pressed charges against the group for libel.

=== Motivations behind the murder ===
Báez Sosa's murder has been labeled as racist and classist attack by activists, scholars, and the Argentine government. In particular, Benicelli's use of the term "negro de mierda"—the meaning of which is complex and reflects various social dimensions—has been highlighted as evidence of the social prejudice behind the group's attack against Báez Sosa.

Báez Sosa's murder was not the first instance of rugby players and rugby culture being associated to violence in Argentina. Other prominent cases such as the murder of Ariel Malvino in 2006 and the homophobic hate crime against Jonathan Castellari in 2018 — both perpetrated by rugby players both professional and amateur — have been highlighted by Argentine media as examples of the "violent" nature of the country's rugby culture.

=== Verdict and sentences ===
The verdict reached in the case (dubbed Cause N° 629, "Thomsen and others") by the Tribunal Criminal N°1 de Dolores was announced on 6 February 2023. All eight were declared guilty of homicide, "doubly-aggravated" by premeditation and ambush. Five of the murderers (Máximo Thomsen, Ciro Pertossi, Luciano Pertossi, Matías Benicelli, and Enzo Comelli) were declared "co-perpetrators" and sentenced to life imprisonment; the remaining three (Lucas Pertossi, Blas Cinalli and Ayrton Viollaz) were declared "secondary participants" and sentenced to 15 years in prison. Thomsen fainted upon during the verdict reading, and the hearing had to be momentarily interrupted.

The verdict was widely followed by mainstream media, and the courtroom livestream on YouTube reached a peak of 95 thousand viewers.

Attorney Burlando and Báez Sosa's parents all manifested their dissatisfaction with the sentences, arguing Lucas Pertossi, Cinalli and Viollaz also deserved to be sentenced to life imprisonment.

== Public response ==
The crime drew widespread outrage and condemnation across diverse sectors of Argentine society. Argentine media dedicated a considerable amount of attention to the case throughout January and February 2020. Paraguayan media also made echo of the case, given Báez Sosa's background. The extensive footage of the fight at the club, both groups of youths being escorted out of the club by security, and the subsequent beating made readily available on social media helped the case gain notoriety as well.

Báez Sosa's parents received messages of condolences from Pope Francis and President of Argentina Alberto Fernández, among others. The Argentine Rugby Union, which governs that federated sport, issued a statement shortly after the murder manifesting its "regret" for Báez Sosa's "death"; the nonspecific wording of the statement attracted considerable criticism on social media. Former national rugby team captain Agustín Pichot (who also played for the same team as Thomsen) publicly apologized to Báez Sosa's parents in the name of the sport as a whole, stating that rugby culture had "naturalized violence".

Several public demonstrations have been held to demand justice for Báez Sosa's murder. On 18 February 2020, a month after the murder, Báez Sosa's parents called for a nationwide demonstration with its epicenter at the plaza by the Congressional Palace in Buenos Aires. Annual demonstrations on the anniversary of the murder have taken place across the country in 2021 and 2022, especially in Villa Gesell. On 9 December 2022, Graciela Sosa led another sit-in before the Congressional Palace. For the occasion of the third anniversary of the murder, on 19 January 2023, Sosa led an "interfaith prayer" in her son's memory in Dolores, the site of the trial. The public gathering was attended by religious leaders from the local Roman Catholic, Muslim, Evangelical, Anglican, Jewish and Umbanda communities, and saw an attendance of over 3,000 people.

Several prominent people in Argentina have spoken out asking for justice for Báez Sosa's murder, such as national football team players Leandro Paredes and Pity Martínez.
