= Tobantirenda =

Coordinates: 22°09′S 63°44′W

- Municipality and village
- Interactive map of Tobantirenda
- Country: Argentina
- Province: Salta Province
- Time zone: UTC−3 (ART)

Tobantirenda is a village and rural municipality in Salta Province in northwestern Argentina.
