= Venezuelan Argentines =

Argentine citizens of Venezuelan descent

Venezolano-argentinos (Spanish)
- People born in Venezuela by province according to RENAPER in 2023 (Not including descendants of Venezuelans)

Total population
- 250,500 (by birth, 2022); 300,000 (by ancestry, 2022); 0.6% of the Argentine population

Regions with significant populations
- Predominantly the Greater Buenos Aires, Córdoba, and Santa Fe

Languages
- Spanish

Religion
- Roman Catholicism

Related ethnic groups
- Venezuelans; Venezuelan Uruguayans · Venezuelan Brazilians · Venezuelan Americans

Venezuelan Argentines (Spanish: venezolano-argentinos) are Argentine citizens of predominantly or total Venezuelan descent, or Venezuelan citizens who have migrated to and settled in Argentina. As of 2022, there are 300,000 Venezuelans living in Argentina, most of whom migrated during the latter half of the 2010s as part of the Venezuelan refugee crisis. The last census held in Argentina, in 2010, registered only 6,000 Venezuelan migrants living in the country.

As of 2018, Venezuelans were the fourth-largest expat community in Argentina, behind Paraguayans, Bolivians and Chileans. According to IOM figures, Argentina granted 170,223 residency permits to Venezuelan citizens alone from 2018 to 2020, nearly twice as many as to Paraguayan citizens. This makes Venezuelans the fastest-growing expat community in the country.

== Characteristics ==
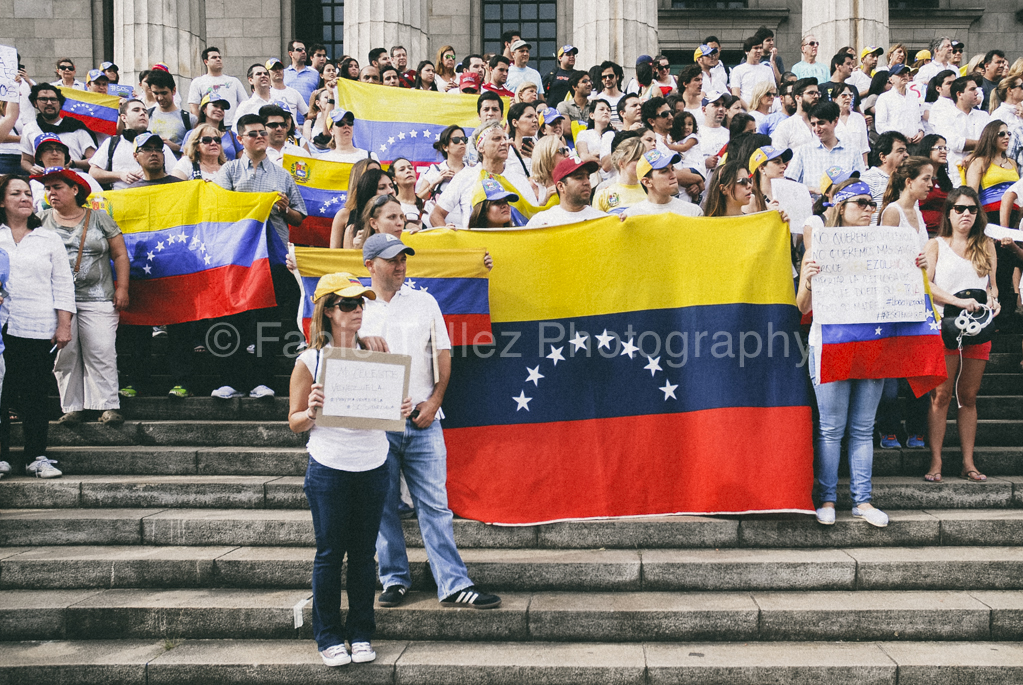
Venezuelans in Buenos Aires supporting students from their country.

Population pyramid of Venezuelan immigrants in 2022 (not including descendants).

The Venezuelan community in Argentina has grown considerably since 2015 due to a number of factors, most notably, the ongoing socioeconomic crisis experienced by the Caribbean country. Despite the geographical distance between the two countries (there are 1920 miles between Venezuela's southernmost city and Argentina's northernmost), Argentina's lax migration laws have made the country a major destination for Venezuelans.

According to a 2019 IOM report studying Venezuelan migrants in Buenos Aires, 80.4% of respondents had jobs at the time the study was conducted (August–September 2019): 55% as employees and 25.4% as independent workers; 15.6% were unemployed. Around 70% of the surveyed migrants counted with a monthly salary ranging between Argentina's mandated minimum wage and twice that amount. By business sector, 43% were active in commerce, 26% in transport (taxi cabs and mobility apps and services such as Uber), 6% in health, and 3% in IT. Nearly 71% of the surveyed migrants worked in the informal economy, while 29% worked in registered jobs.

The Venezuelan diaspora in Argentina has been politically active, being overwhelmingly supportive for Argentina’s far-right president, elected in 2023, Javier Milei.

== Notable people ==
- Brenda Asnicar (born 1991), actress
- Grecia Colmenares (born 1963), actress
- Catherine Fulop (born 1965), model
- Ángel David Revilla (born 1982), YouTuber
- Oriana Sabatini (born 1996), actress

== See also ==
- Argentina–Venezuela relations
- Immigration to Argentina
- Venezuelan diaspora
- Argentine Venezuelans
