= Peruvians in Chile =

Peruvians in Chile Peruanos en Chile
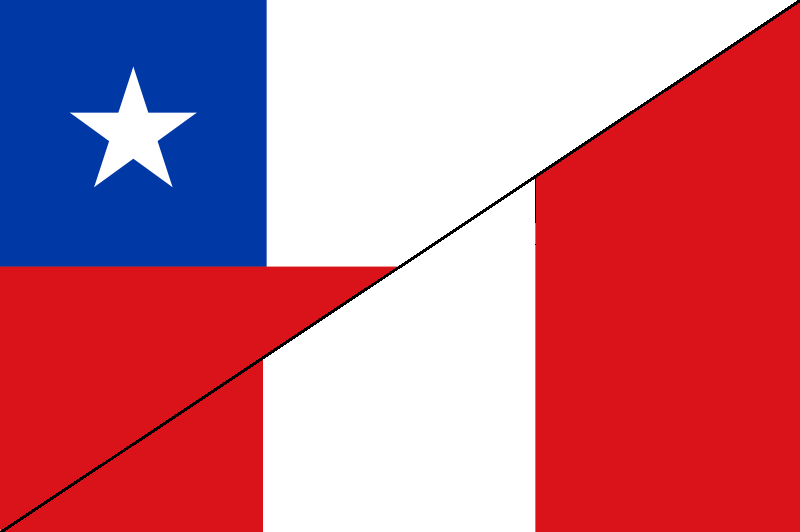

Total population
- 235,165 (2019)

Languages
- Chilean Spanish · Peruvian Spanish · Quechuan · Aymara

Religion
- Christianity, minorities of other religions.

Peruvians in Chile (Spanish: Peruanos en Chile) consists of mainly of immigrants and expatriates from Peru as well as their locally born descendants. Both countries share the Spanish language; their historical origins are common (part of the Spanish Empire).

== Illegal immigration ==
A significant portion of immigrants to Chile are Peruvian. Geographic proximity lowers travel costs and enables migrants to maintain family ties in Peru. A shared language also makes Chile a more accessible destination than more distant countries like the United States or Japan.

Primary destination countries for Peruvian emigrants
Destination	Percentage of total emigrants
United States	31.5
Spain	16.0
Argentina	14.3
Italy	10.1
Chile	8.8
Japan	4.1
Venezuela	3.8

Many Peruvian immigrants who arrived in the 1990s are second- or third-generation descendants of indigenous peoples who moved from rural areas to Peruvian cities during the agricultural crisis of the 1960s. Throughout the 1990s, the government of Alberto Fujimori presided over rising poverty, with 54% of Peru's population living below the poverty line. Between 1980 and 1993, terrorist violence in the country also displaced approximately half a million people.

== Notable people ==
- Tomás Enrique Araya Díaz, Chilean-American musician of Basque, Spanish, Peruvian descent.
- José Balbuena Rodríguez, Peruvian-born Chilean soccer player (born in Lima).
- Felipe Humberto Camiroaga Fernández, Television presenter, actor, comedian of Basque, German and Peruvian descent.
- Pablo Ignacio Cárdenas Baeza, Soccer player, Peruvian father
- Segundo Castillo Varela, Peruvian-born Chilean soccer player (born in Callao, Peru)
- Javier García Choque, Chilean politician, Peruvian great-grandfather
- Joao Luis Ortiz Pérez, Chilean-Peruvian soccer player, Peruvian father
- Marko Zaror, Actor, Peruvian mother.

== See also ==
- Chile-Peru relations
