= Bolivian Argentines =

Buliwyanu Arhintinapi (Quechua) Boliviano-argentinos (Spanish)
- People born in Bolivia by province according to 2022 census. (Not including descendants of Bolivians)

Total population
- 338.299 (by birth, 2022) + 2.000.000 (by ancestry); 4.1% of Argentina's population

Regions with significant populations
- Mainly in Greater Buenos Aires, Jujuy, Salta, Mendoza and Patagonia.

Languages
- Majority: Quechua · Aymara · Spanish; Minority: Guarani · Others

Religion
- Majority: Roman Catholicism; Minority: Native American religions

Related ethnic groups
- Bolivians; Bolivian Brazilians · Bolivian Americans · Bolivian British · Bolivian Uruguayans

Bolivian Argentines (Quechua: Buliwyanu Arhintinapi, Aymara: Bolivia markankir argentinonaka, Spanish: Boliviano-argentinos) are Argentine citizens of predominantly or total Bolivian descent or Bolivia-born people who immigrated to Argentina. In recent decades, Bolivia has become one of the main sources of immigration in Argentina, making Bolivians one of the largest Hispanic American immigrant groups in Argentina, along with Paraguayans, Peruvians and Venezuelans.

In Argentina, at the beginning of the 21st century, lies the world's largest Bolivian community outside Bolivia. The 2001 census recorded 233,464 legal Bolivians residing in Argentina, in equal parts for women and men. This is due in large part to economic abundance, the favorable opportunities which immigrants have in Argentina, and the healthcare and quality of life.

The Permanent Assembly for Human Rights of Bolivia considers that there are over 3 million Bolivian citizens living in different foreign countries. Of these, migration to Argentina accounts for 73% of the total, being the largest Bolivian diaspora group abroad. Today, it is estimated that more than 338.000 Bolivians reside in Argentina.

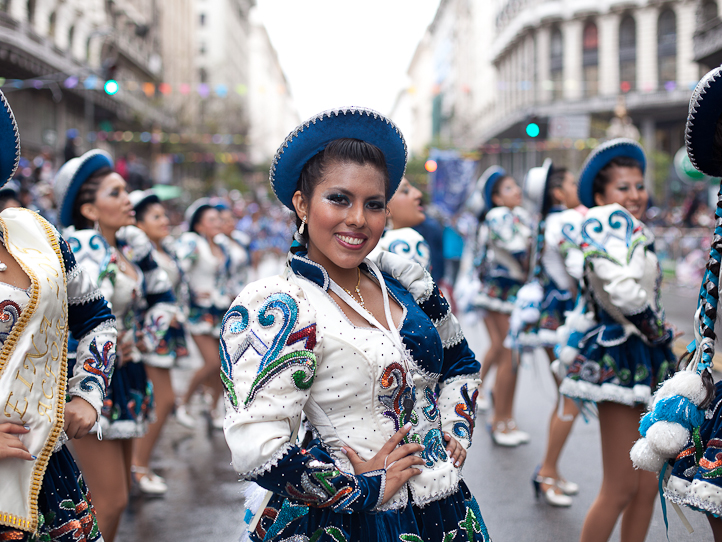
Bolivian Argentine woman in the Annual Parade of the Bolivian Community in Buenos Aires.

Most Bolivians reside in Greater Buenos Aires, especially in La Matanza, Morón, Tres de Febrero and Escobar partidos. Within the City of Buenos Aires, they reside mainly in the neighbourhoods of Flores, Villa Soldati, Villa Lugano, Liniers and Nueva Pompeya. There are also important Bolivian communities in the provinces of Salta, Jujuy and Tucumán. Moreover, about 50,000 Bolivians reside in the provinces of Neuquén and Río Negro in the Patagonia Region.

== History ==
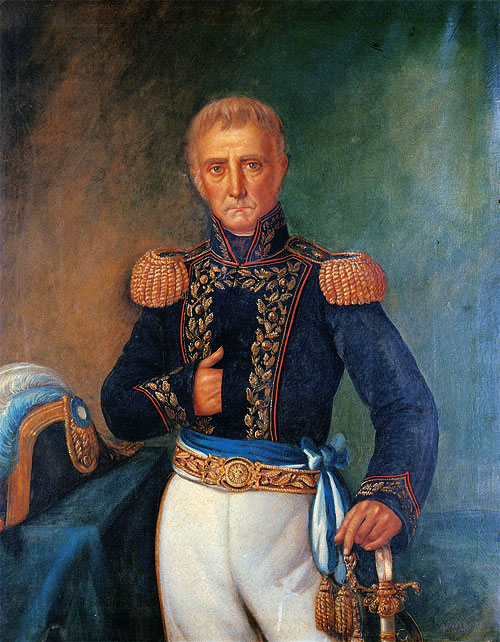
Cornelio Saavedra

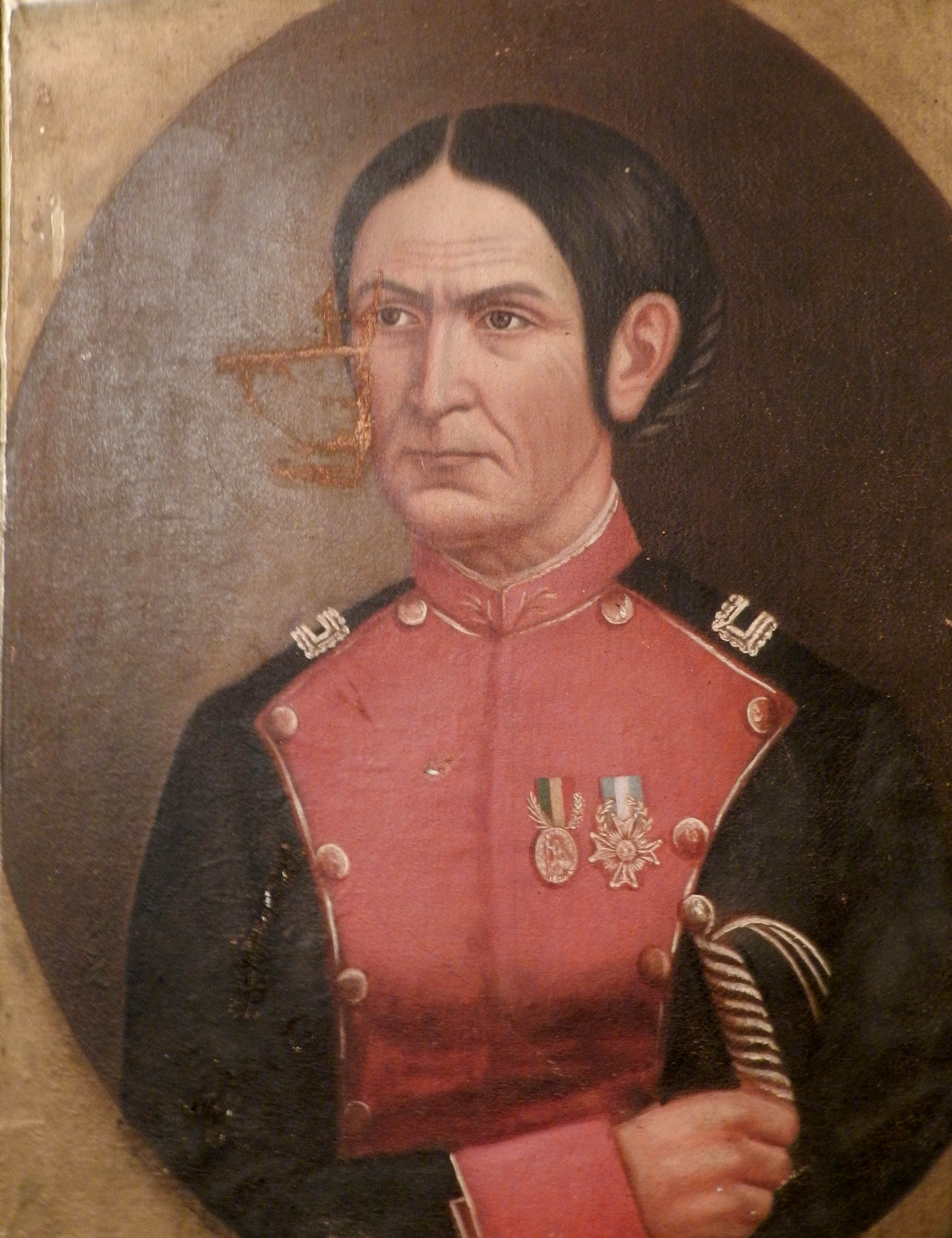
Juana Azurduy de Padilla

Bolivian immigration to Argentina has been constant since colonial times. Both countries were under Spanish rule as part of the Viceroyalty of Peru and then the Viceroyalty of the Río de la Plata until the Spanish American wars of independence.

During colonial times, much of Argentine territory was a link between Buenos Aires and Upper Peru (present-day Bolivia).

=== 20th century ===
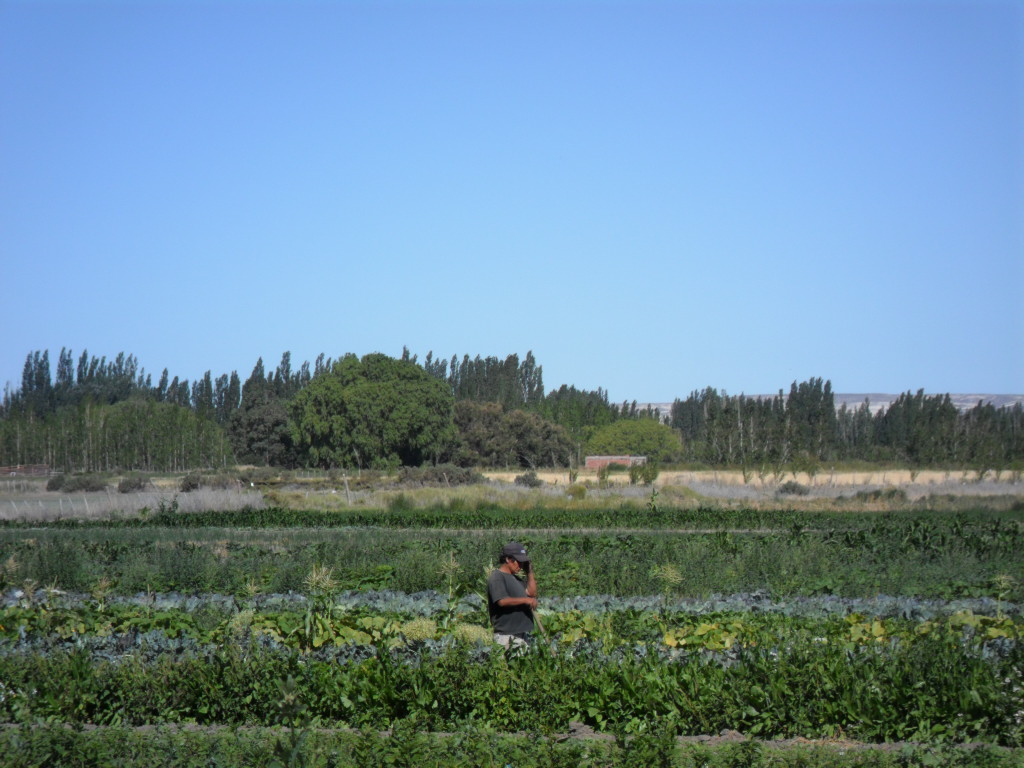
Most horticultural production in lower Chubut River Valley is made by Bolivian immigrants who settled in the valley a few decades ago.

In the early 20th century, Bolivian immigration to Argentina was heading Argentine north to work in the harvest season of sugarcane and snuff. From the '50s it was constituted a significant part of the market related to the tomato, peppers and bananas, among others, in northern Argentina. During the 1960s and 1970s they were present at harvest and other crops in the west of the country and began to maintain a permanent presence in the city of Buenos Aires standing out in the horticultural work. Since then, Bolivians are found throughout the country.

The first migration wave of the modern era was held in 1940 after the ease of entry that gave the Argentine government engaged in the sugar crops of Salta and Jujuy, in the 1960s they moved to the province of Mendoza to collect the fruit and vegetables, or for collecting snuff leaves. After that, many moved to Buenos Aires to work as laborers, masons, and so many other jobs. Some also moved to southern lands such as Comodoro Rivadavia, and north of the province of Chubut because of the oil "boom".

During the Falklands War (Spanish: Guerra de Malvinas) in 1982, some 25,000 Bolivians living in northern Argentina, mainly in the province of Salta, expressed their decision to act as volunteers in the defense of the islands in support of Argentina.

=== 21st century ===
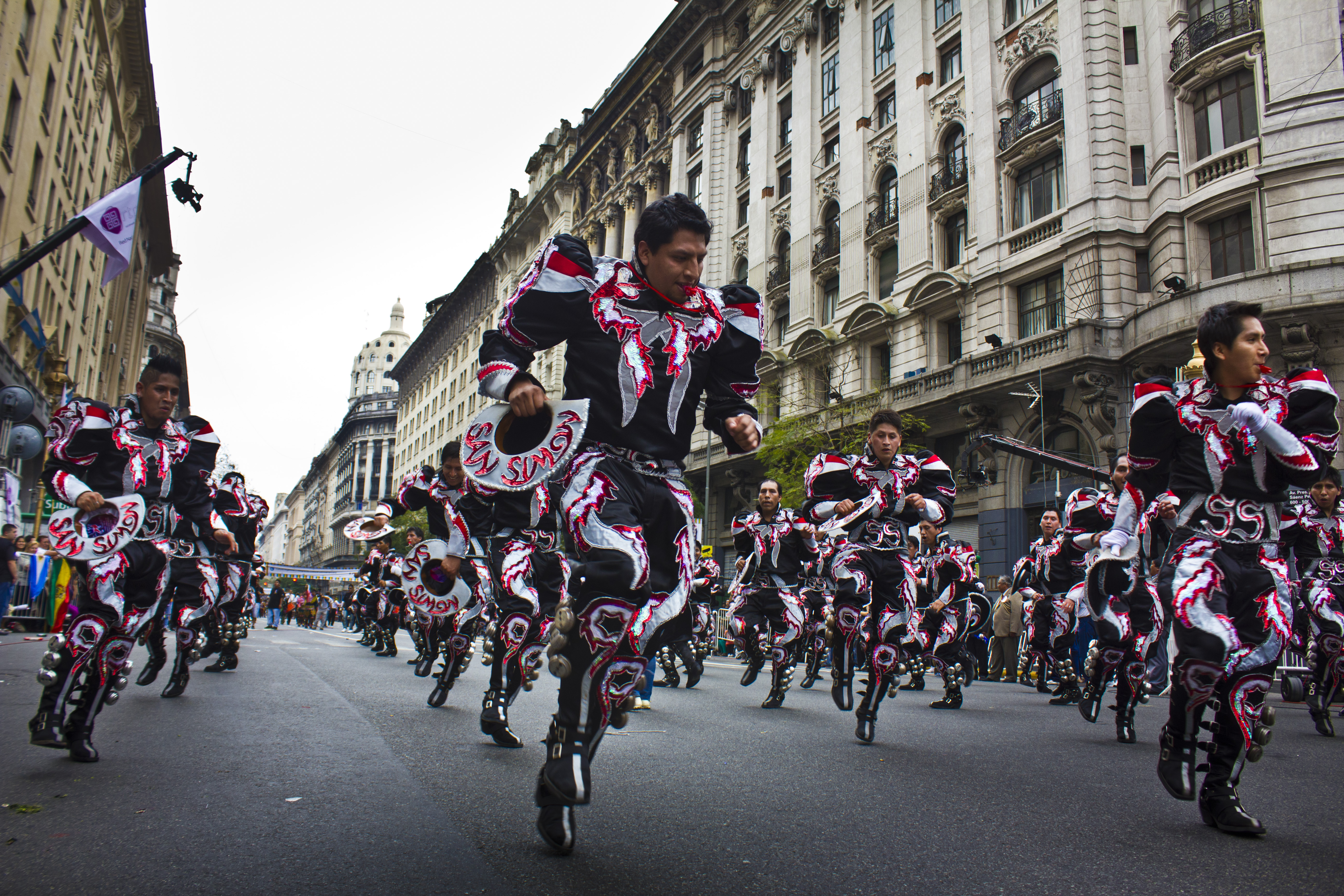
Annual Bolivian Community Parade in Buenos Aires, in honor of the Virgen de Copacabana.

At the beginning of the 21st century, Argentina is home to the world's largest Bolivian community. The 2001 census recorded 233,464 legal Bolivians in Argentina in equal parts for women and men.

Bolivian immigrants in Argentina found a place to work, progress, and help their families. Thousands of Bolivians have joined the Argentine everyday life, contributing in areas as diverse as construction, education, health, sports and music areas. In addition, elements of Bolivian cuisine have become more popular in some areas where the Bolivian community is remarkable.

== Notable Bolivian Argentines ==
- Cornelio Saavedra, military officer and statesman, president of the Primera Junta.
- Juana Azurduy de Padilla, Latin American guerilla military leader.
- José Severo Malabia, statesman, lawyer and a representative to the Congress of Tucumán.
- Tarateño Rojas, singer, musician and composer.
- María Eugenia Estenssoro, politician, journalist and activist for women's rights.
- Stephanie Beatriz, actress.

== See also ==
- Argentina–Bolivia relations
- Immigration to Argentina
- Racism in Argentina
- Paraguayan Argentines
- Peruvian Argentines
