= Paraguayan Argentines =

Large ethnic group

Paraguaiguakuéra Arahentínape (Guarani) Paraguayo-argentinos (Spanish)
- People born in Paraguay by province according to 2022 census. (Not including descendants of Paraguayans)

Total population
- 522.598 (by birth, 2022) +2.000.000 (by ancestry); 4.1% of the Argentine population

Regions with significant populations
- Mainly in Greater Buenos Aires and the Argentine Littoral.

Languages
- Spanish · Guarani

Religion
- Roman Catholicism

Related ethnic groups
- Paraguayans · Paraguayan Americans

Paraguayan Argentines (Guarani: Paraguaiguakuéra Arahentíname, Spanish: Paraguayo-argentinos) are Argentine citizens of predominantly or total Paraguayan descent or Paraguay-born people who reside in Argentina. Paraguayan people comprise an important ethnic group in the country due to the sustained immigration that gained importance in the 1970s.

The number of people born in Paraguay living in Argentina has been estimated to be about 550,000. Therefore, it is the largest foreign community in the country outnumbering individuals from Italy and Spain (countries which have been historically regarded as the origin of the backbone of Argentine society). It is also one of the fastest growing foreign nationalities. Despite all this, its numbers have been undercounted so it is believed that the real amount is even much higher.

== History ==
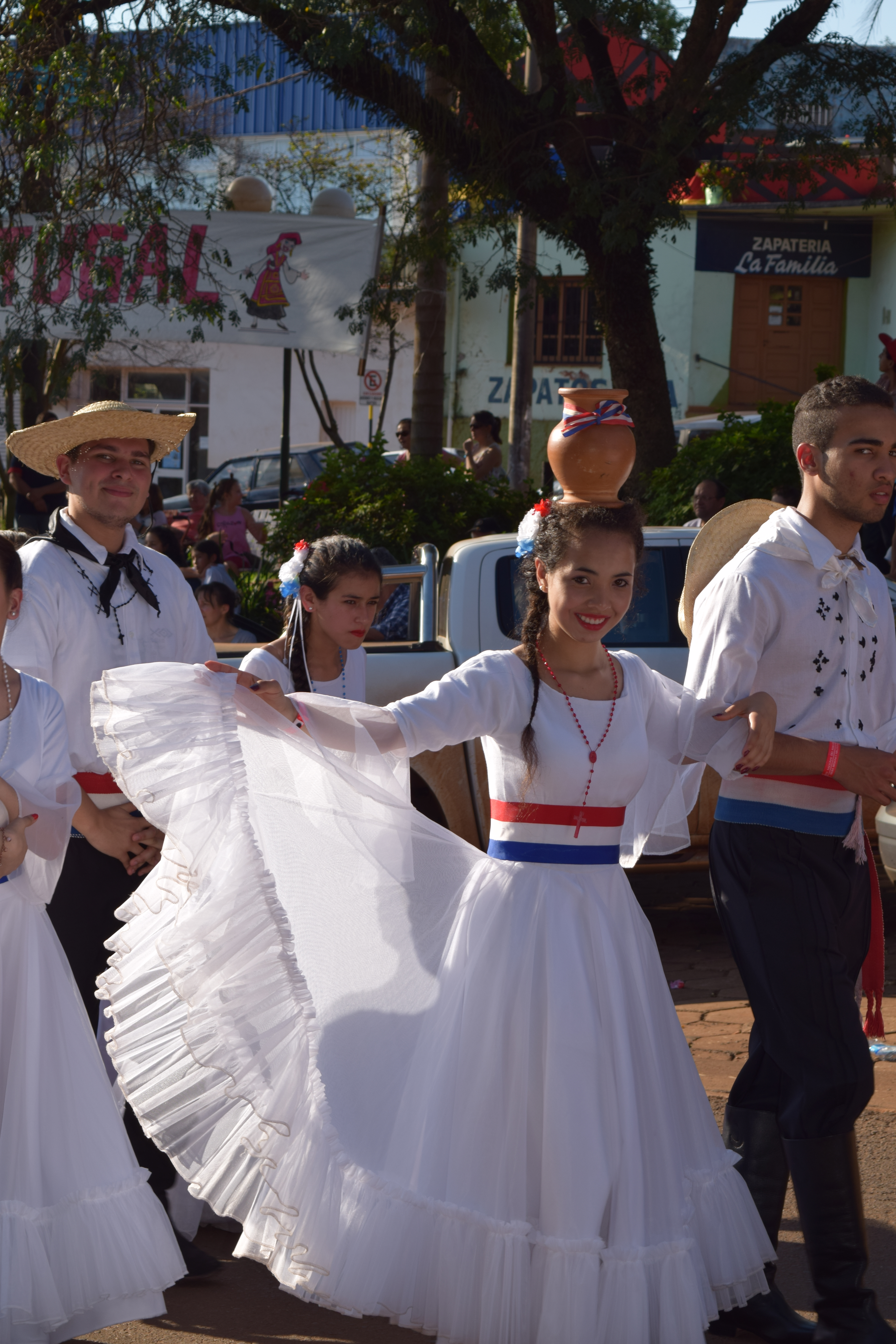
Paraguayans in the inaugural parade of the Immigrant's Festival

The North-Eastern provinces of Argentina were originally inhabited by Guarani tribes conforming with what is now Paraguay and several regions of Brazil the area of influence of Guarani culture. This influence can be seen nowadays in many common cultural features. However, the earliest presence of Paraguayans as an ethnic group can be traced back much later, to the second foundation (and the real permanent settlement) of the city of Buenos Aires by Juan de Garay who sailed down Parana River from Asunción accompanied by local Mestizo and Guarani families. In addition, there have always been certain connections between the two countries during later periods of the Spanish rule, especially when the Viceroyalty of the Rio de la Plata was created in 1776 which included several Intendencias, among them the Intendencia of Paraguay and Intendencia of Buenos Aires.

There has been Paraguayan presence in Argentine soil during and after the Paraguayan War and after the Revolution of 1947 in Paraguay but it did not acquire importance before 1970. For many economic reasons (Paraguay being an impoverished country) and political reasons (Stroessner dictatorship), Paraguayans started to settle in larger amounts throughout the wealthier neighbouring territory. Another fact was the porosity of Argentine borders and that the population density has always been disproportionally higher in the Eastern region (Argentine-Brazilian border) rather than the Western region or Chaco (Bolivian border).

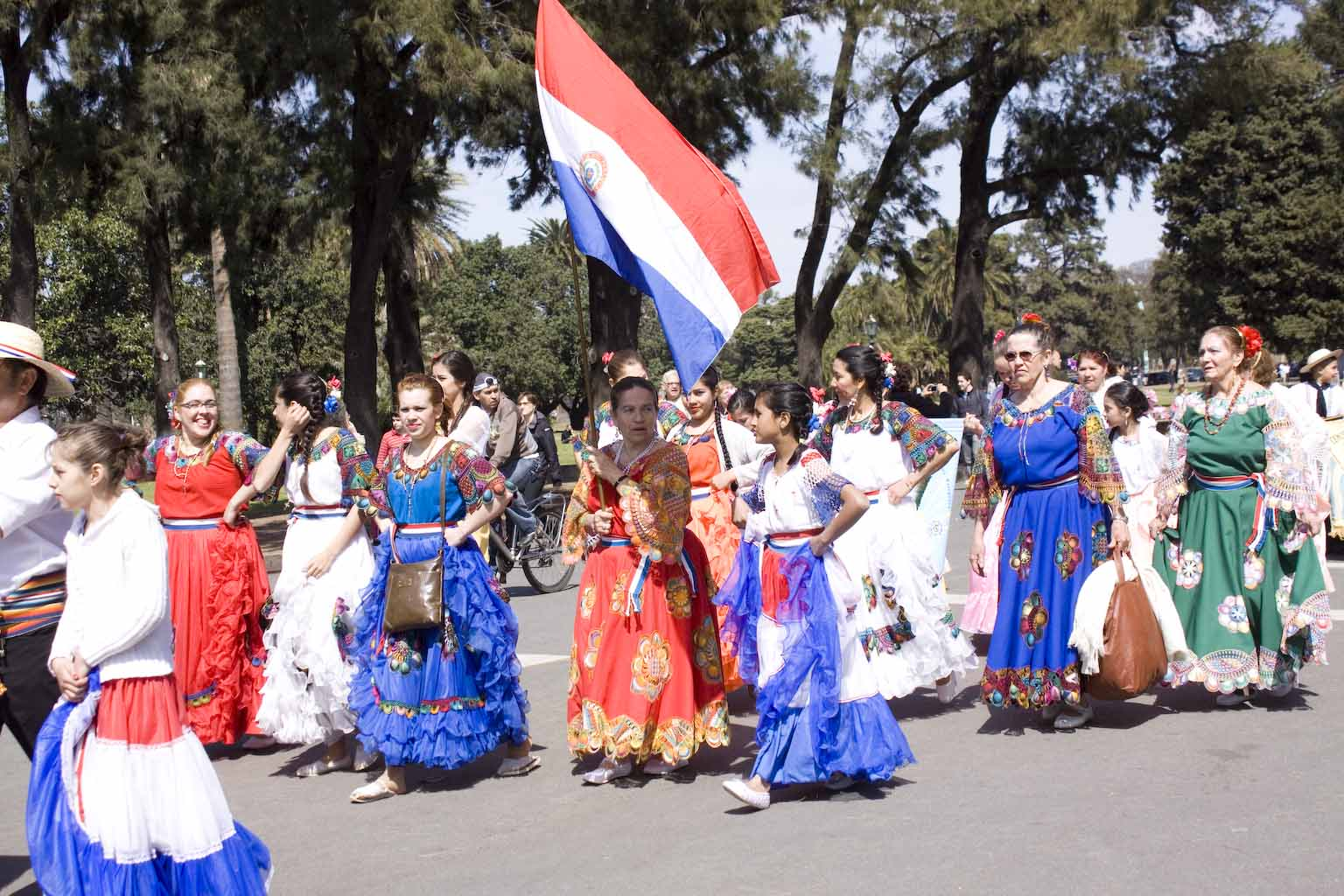
White Paraguayans on Immigrant's Day in Buenos Aires

Very different from other immigrant communities in Argentina (European and Middle-Eastern), Paraguayan entrance has been large (with insignificant return rate) and constant even to these days which makes up to 40 years of sustained immigration that does not seem to stop or decline in the future.

== Distribution ==
Paraguayan Argentines
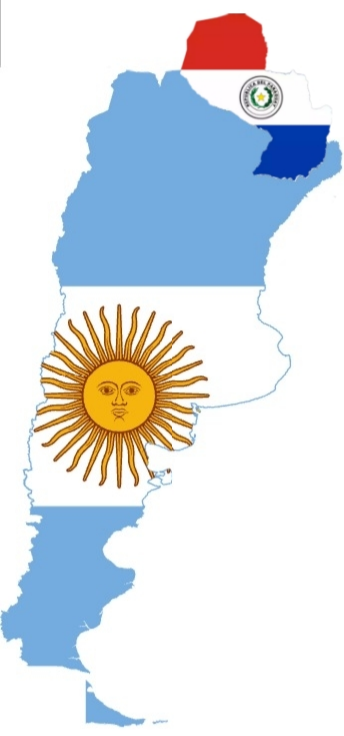
The maps of Paraguay and Argentina (left), the distribution of Paraguayan Argentines by Argentine provinces (2023) (right).

Population pyramid of Paraguayan immigrants in 2022 (not including descendants).

According to the 2010 census [INDEC], the distribution of Paraguayan-born residents in Argentina is not evenly spread throughout Argentina's territory: Buenos Aires and the Buenos Aires Province are the top destinations for Paraguayans. In addition, due to geographical proximity facilitating movement and cultural exchange, 40% of the Paraguayan-born community is settled in provinces of the Northeastern region of Argentina, namely Misiones, Corrientes, Formosa, Santa Fe, Córdoba and Chaco, which are near the Argentina–Paraguay border. The 10% left is spread throughout the rest of the provinces.

#	Province	Paraguayan-born people	
#	Province	#	%
1	Buenos Aires Province	392,697	71.31%
2	City of Buenos Aires	80,325	15.00%
3	(Misiones Province) Misiones	26,799	4.87%
4	(Formosa Province) Formosa	20,280	3.68%
5	(Santa Fe Province) Santa Fe	8,154	1.48%
6	(Chaco Province) Chaco	4,089	0.74%
7	(Córdoba Province, Argentina) Córdoba	4,064	0.73%
8	(Corrientes Province) Corrientes	3,397	0.62%
9	(Chubut Province) Chubut	1,911	0.35%
10	(Entre Ríos Province) Entre Ríos	1,420	0.26%
11	(Santa Cruz Province, Argentina) Santa Cruz	1,368	0.25%
12	(Río Negro Province) Río Negro	1,123	0.20%
13	(Neuquén Province) Neuquén	1,122	0.20%
14	(Salta Province) Salta	651	0.12%
15	(Mendoza Province) Mendoza	587	0.11%
16	(Tierra del Fuego Province, Argentina) Tierra del Fuego	532	0.10%
17	(Tucumán Province) Tucumán	439	0.08%
18	(La Pampa Province) La Pampa	406	0.07%
19	(San Luis Province) San Luis	397	0.07%
20	(Santiago del Estero Province) Santiago del Estero	316	0.05%
21	(Jujuy Province) Jujuy	311	0.05%
22	(Catamarca Province) Catamarca	123	0.02%
23	(La Rioja Province, Argentina) La Rioja	114	0.02%
24	(San Juan Province, Argentina) San Juan	88	0.01%
Total	Argentina	550,713	100%

Paraguayans in Argentina according to INDEC and RENAPER

Source: The National Institute of Statistics and Censuses (INDEC) and the National Register of persons (RENAPER)
Graphic prepared by: Wikipedia

== Traditions ==
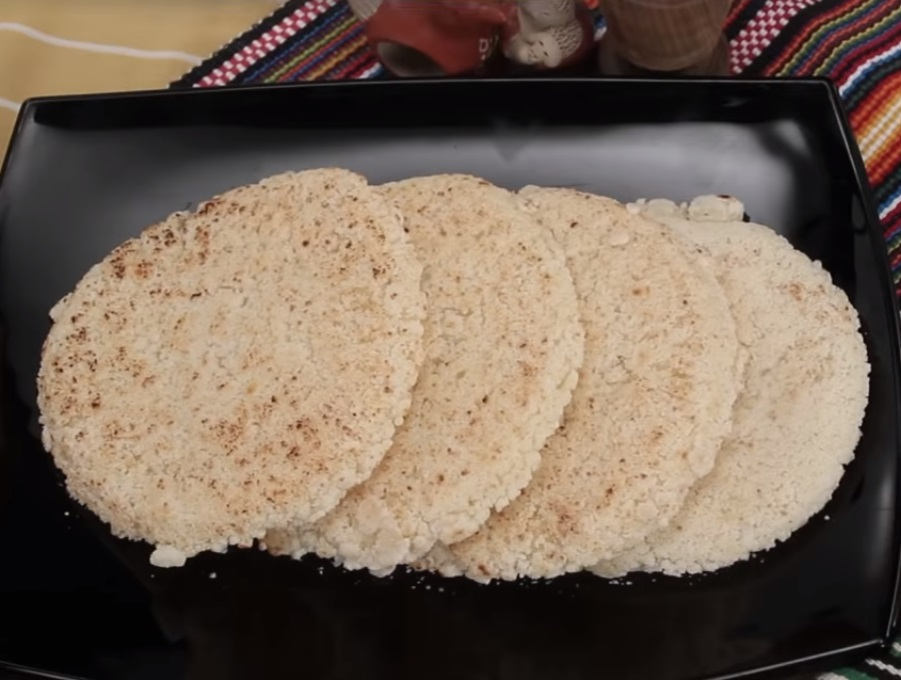
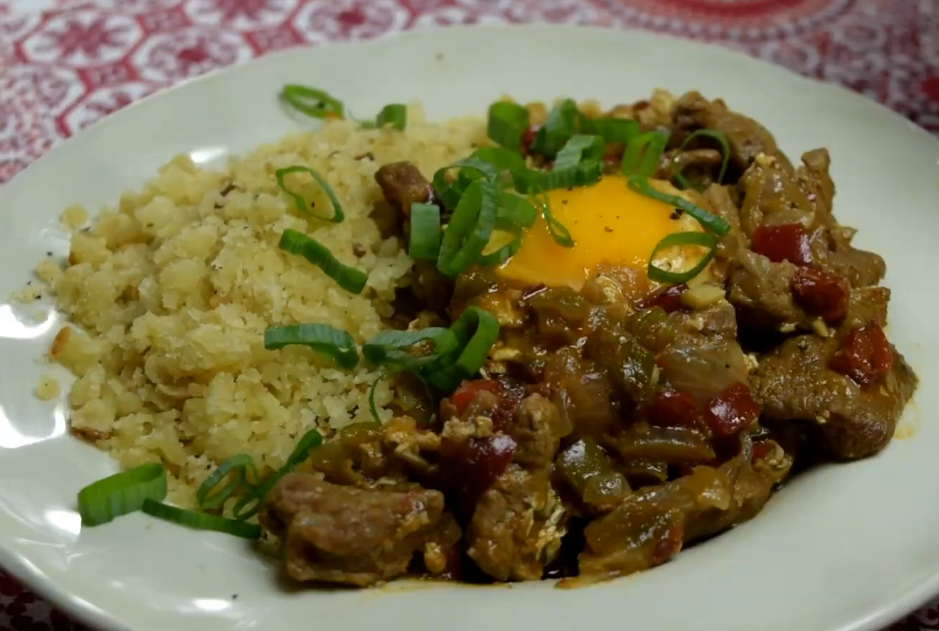
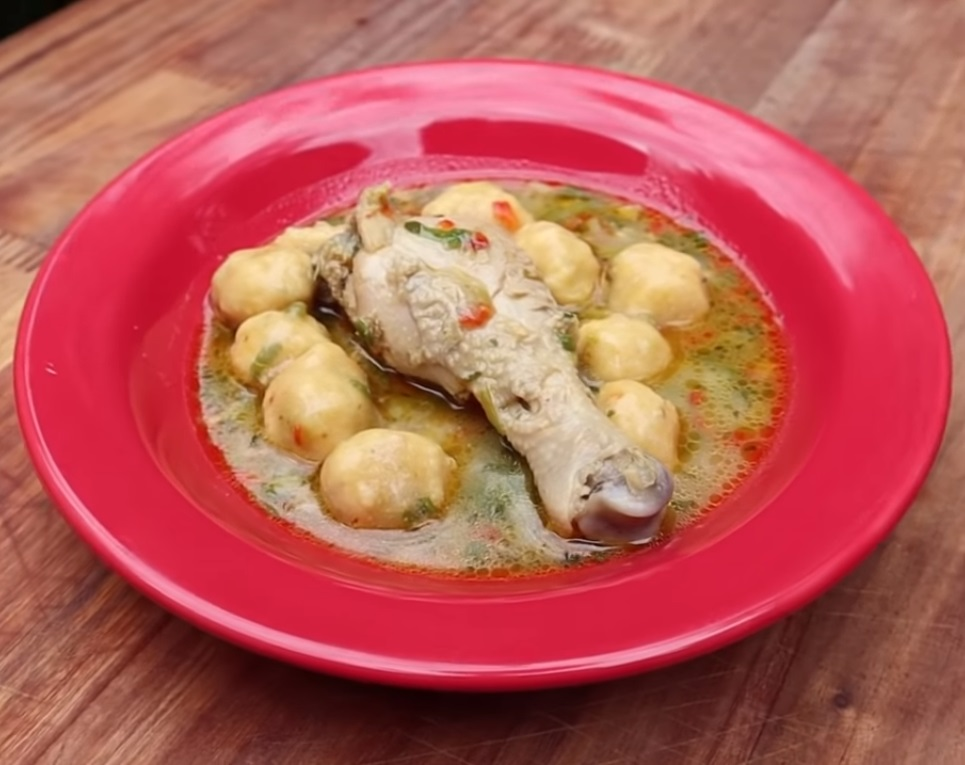
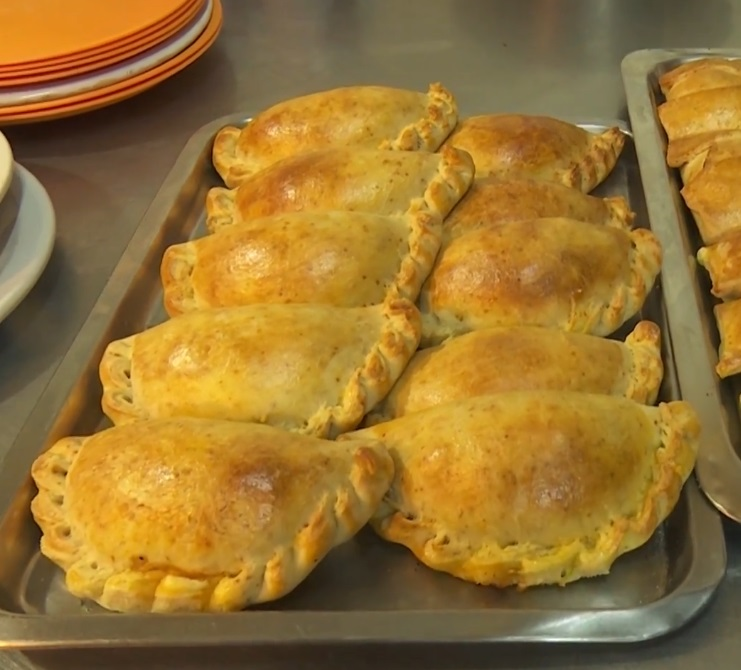
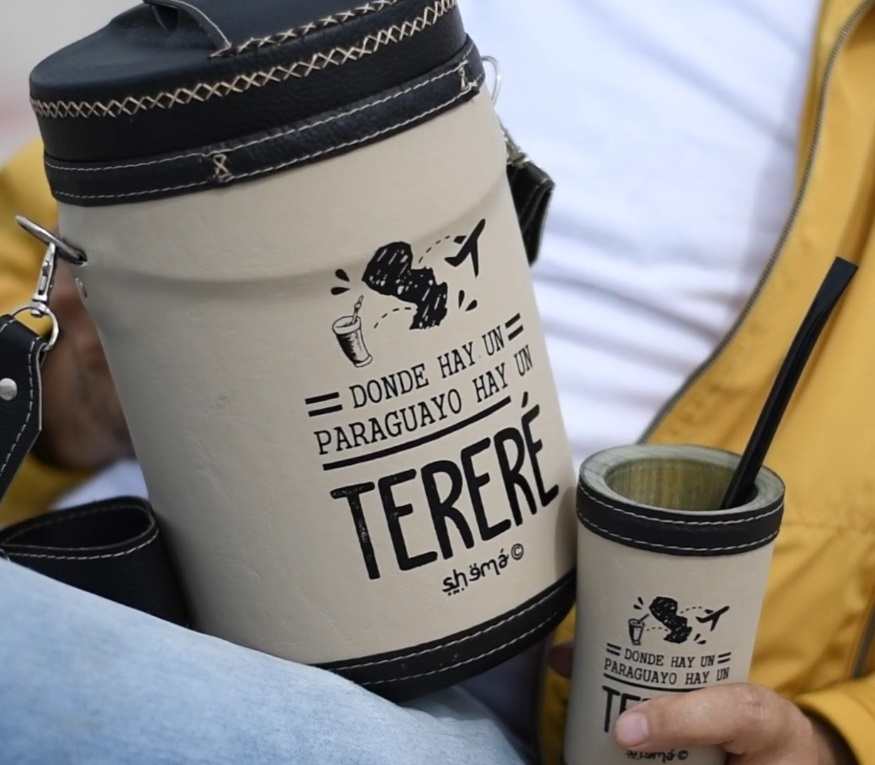
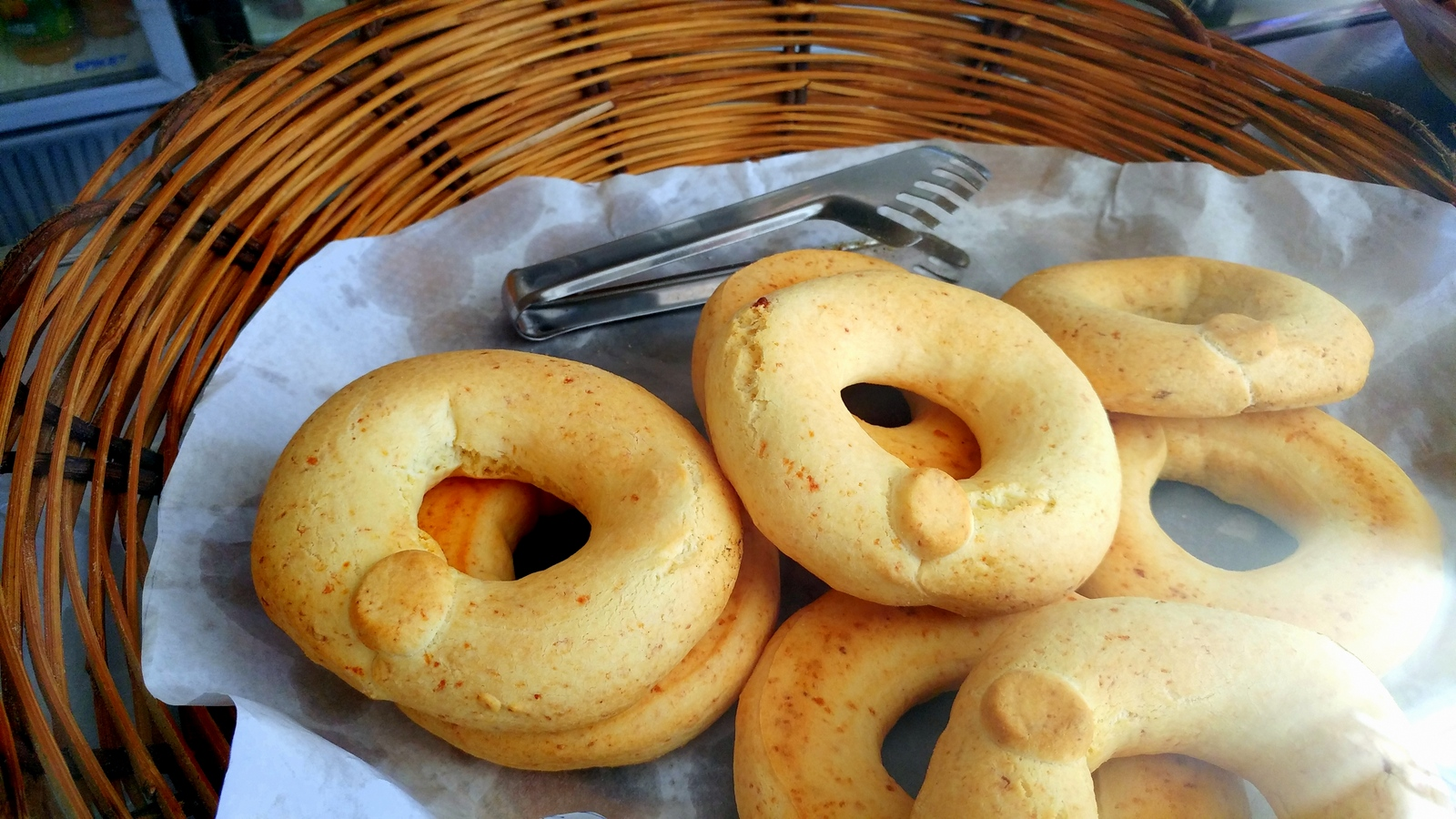
Some elements of the Paraguayan cuisine that are not only appreciated by Paraguayan Argentines but also by all residents of Argentina; Mbeju, Reviro, Bori-Bori, Paraguayan Empanadas, Tereré, Chipa.

Some cultural elements shared by Argentina and Paraguay include the consumption of yerba mate (Ilex paraguayensis) in the form of mate, a traditional infused drink with hot water claimed by Argentina, Paraguay and Uruguay as the national drink, as well as Tereré, a traditional infused drink with cold water and Mate cocido, a traditional infused drink with hot water, both originally from Paraguay; Chamame, folk music genre with its origins in Guarani Jesuit Missions mixed with European styles, and the use of the Guaraní Language, which is the official language of Paraguay and second official language of the Argentine Corrientes Province since 24 September 2004.

== Guarani placenames in Argentina ==
=== Corrientes ===
Ituzaingó Curuzú Cuatiá Caá Catí Cerro Corá Mburucuyá ("Passion flower" the National flower of Paraguay) Mocoretá Tabay ("small town") Tapebicua Tatacuá ("the hole of the fire") Taragui Yahapé Yataytí Calle Yapeyú Itatí Itá Ibaté ("tall stone") Guaviraví Vaca Cuá Ita Corá Aguay

=== Misiones ===
Oberá ("shiny") Caa Yarí Capiobí Caraguatay Garuhapé Garuhapé-Mi Garupá Guaraní Itacaruaré Mbopicuá ("hole of the bat") Panambí ("butterfly") Pindapoy Piray Kilómetro 18 Puerto Iguazú (Iguazú meaning "large water") Puerto Piray (Piray meaning "small fish") Tarumá Tacuaruzú Cuña-Pirú

=== Chaco ===
Samuhú ("Chorisia" a kind of subtropical tree) Colonia Tacuarí El Paranacito

=== Salta ===
Aguaray Yariguarenda Yacuy El Aguay Acambuco Itangua Tobantirenda Capiazuti

=== Santa Fe ===
Tacuarendí ("sugarcane fields") El Arazá Caraguatay Aguará Grande Ñanducita ("small spider") Tacural ("anthills") Vera ("shiny") Carcarañá ("mean caracara")

=== Santiago del Estero ===
Añatuya Caburé Urutaú

=== Tucumán ===
Tukumã Tapia ("wall") El Timbo

=== Formosa ===
Pirané ("smelly fish") Ibarreta Yatai Tatané

=== Entre Ríos ===
Gualeguay Paraná Mandisoví Villaguay Ubajay Gualeguaychú Chajarí Ñancay Ibicuy

=== Buenos Aires Province ===
Pehuajó, Reta "retã" ("country or nation"), Mar de Ajó, Mar del Tuyú, San Bernardo del Tuyú, Ituzaingó ("waterfall")

=== Rivers ===
Paraná Paraguay ("colorful water") Uruguay ("water of the birds") Carapari Gualeguay Gualeguaychú Guayquiraró Rivers of the Paraná Delta Ibicuy

== Notable Paraguayan Argentines ==
=== Politicians ===
- Aníbal Ibarra (born 1958), mayor of Buenos Aires in 2000–2006
- Vilma Ibarra (born 1960), lawyer and congresswoman

=== Arts and culture ===
- Arnaldo André (born 1943), actor
- Julio Bazan (born 1946), journalist
- Gabriel Casaccia (1907–1980), novelist
- Florencia de la V (born 1975), television presenter and vedette
- Mariana Enríquez (born 1973), novelist and short story writer
- Eloy Fariña Núñez (1885–1929), writer
- Pablo Lescano (born 1977), cumbia villera musician
- Ángel Menchaca (1855–1924), music theorist and composer
- Nelly Prono (1926–1997), actress

=== Sportspeople ===
- Roberto Acuña (born 1972), footballer
- Lucas Barrios (born 1984), footballer
- Walter Benítez (born 1993), footballer
- Raúl Bobadilla (born 1987), footballer
- Juan José Cáceres (born 2000), footballer
- Marcelo Cañete (born 1990), footballer
- Darío Espínola (born 1973), footballer
- Luis Fariña (born 1991), footballer
- Nicole Hain (born 2000), futsal player
- Juan Iturbe (born 1993), footballer
- David Martínez (born 1998), footballer
- Hilario Navarro (born 1980), footballer
- Leandro Paredes (born 1994), footballer
- Jonathan Santana (born 1981), footballer
- Brian Sarmiento (born 1990), footballer
- Julio Soler (born 2005), footballer

== See also ==
- Argentina–Paraguay relations
- Immigration to Argentina
- Racism in Argentina
- Bolivian Argentines
- Peruvian Argentines
