= Racism in Argentina =

In Argentina, there are and have been cases of discrimination based on ethnic characteristics or national origin. In turn, racial discrimination tends to be closely related to discriminatory behavior for socio-economic and political reasons.

The prevalence and characteristics of racism in Argentina remain debated. Some commentators describe explicitly racist behaviour as marginal or socially rejected, while other writers and researchers argue that racism is widespread and expressed through language, social hierarchies, political identities, and institutional practices.

In 1995, Law No. 24,515 established the National Institute Against Discrimination, Xenophobia and Racism (INADI), which began operating in 1997. The institute was created to receive complaints, conduct investigations, develop public-awareness campaigns, and provide assistance to people affected by discrimination.

== Against specific groups ==
=== Black people ===
Black people, many of whom were brought to the region through the legal and illegal transatlantic slave trade, constituted a substantial share of the population during the late colonial period. Analyses of the 1778 colonial census estimate that people of African descent made up roughly one-quarter to one-third of the population of the territory that is now Argentina, with higher proportions in Buenos Aires and several interior provinces. Following the gradual abolition of slavery—beginning with the Freedom of Wombs Act in 1813 and culminating in constitutional abolition in 1853—the Afro-Argentine population declined in relative size through a combination of emancipation, intermarriage, wars, epidemics, large-scale European immigration, changing census classifications, and state policies promoting European immigration and whitening (blanqueamiento).

Ever since at least the 20th century, blackness has been conceived in Argentina as both a low social class and a biological category. In this view, a person can be considered black, a "negro boludo", regardless of their racial heritage or personal appearance. Not only biological traits such as dark skin, but also class markers such as attitudes, economic status and appearance, can make a person a "negro" (and identify themselves as such), even if they fit other stereotypes of whiteness. The use of the word "negro" is not necessarily derogatory, as it can also be used as a term of endearment.

In 1996, during a diplomatic trip, when asked if there were black people in Argentina, President Carlos Menem remarked that "no, this is a problem Brazil has".

== Whiteness in Argentina ==
Although most other Latin American countries began identifying themselves as multi-ethnic and mixed-race democracies during the 20th century, Argentina continued to identify itself as uniformly white even though it was not.

Self-identification for Indigenous Argentines was first included in the country's 2001 Census, and for Afro-Argentines in the 2010 Census - amounting to 1,306,730 and 302,936 persons, respectively, as of the 2022 Census.

== Racial terms ==
A series of terms are used in Argentina that have a certain discriminatory intention and constitute a particular form of racism.

=== Indio ===
There has been a trend over the last several decades of naming children with indigenous names such as Ayelén, Maitén, or Lautaro, particularly since the Argentine government revised its laws prohibiting the use of indigenous names.

There is a tendency to label all indigenous people as indio or indígena without the speaker specifying, or even knowing, which group the person belongs to. This is a generalized practice that is common to Latin America as a whole and not just Argentina, and is directly related to the effacement of non-European cultures.

=== Mestizo ===
The word mestizo is not used very often in daily speech, although it is relatively common in the context of social sciences and history, sometimes with racial connotations.

The use of mestizo as a racist term comes from the colonial caste system which was based on the concept of pure blood: the mestizo was considered inferior to the pure Spanish because his blood was mixed which made him impure. Although today it is known that biologically there is no such thing as a pure person, and various researchers have recycled the term to refer to any exchange of DNA, and various other experts assert that all peoples and races are the result of prior mixing of races, during the Spanish colonization of the Americas the idea was imposed that mestizo should be applied only to those persons of mixed indigenous and European ancestry, in order to demarcate their difference from the pure people who were generally of European ancestry.

The racist colonial concept of mestizaje to some extent endures to this day, as witnessed by the recent debate about the racial origin of José de San Martín, one of the founders of Argentina. Commenting on this phenomenon, historian Hugo Chumbita asserted that "there has been and continues to be resistance to revising official history due to the idea that by corroborating the mixed racial origin of San Martín, then Argentina's image would be tarnished." In a similar vein, an Argentine newspaper reported that conservatives voices were complaining: "If the founding father is a mestizo bastard, then so is Argentina."

=== Boliguayo ===
The word boliguayo, a combination of boliviano ('Bolivian') and paraguayo ('Paraguayan'), is a blatantly derogatory term that first appeared in the 1990s and its use is growing rapidly in the first decade of the 21st century. The term's derogatory nature comes precisely from the speaker's indifference to the immigrant's identity and a disrespect towards their indigenous background.

The following interview with a rugby player demonstrates how the term is used:

Why do they call you Boliguayo?: I really don't know, they gave me the nickname when I was on a road trip if my memory serves me correctly. I was sort of boliguayo (dumb, slow).

== Types of racism in Argentina ==
=== "European" racism and Article 25 of the Constitution ===
In Argentina, an extensive racist ideology has been built on the notion of European supremacy. This ideology forwards the idea that Argentina is a country populated by European immigrants bajados de los barcos (straight off the boat), frequently referred to as "our grandfathers", who founded a special type of European society that is not Latin-American. In addition, this ideology holds forth that cultural influences from other communities such as the Aborigines, Africans, fellow Latin-Americans, Arabs, Asians, and Pacific Islanders, are not relevant and even undesirable.

European racism in Argentina has a history of government participation. The ideology even has a legal foundation that was set forth in Article 25 of the National Constitution sponsored by Juan Bautista Alberdi. The article establishes a difference between European immigration (which should be encouraged) and non-European immigration.

Article 25: The Federal Government will encourage European immigration; and will not restrict, limit, nor tax the entry of any foreigner into the territory of Argentina who comes with the goal of working the land, bettering industry, or introducing or teaching sciences or the arts.

— Constitution of Argentina

Alberdi, the article's sponsor and the father of the Argentine Constitution of 1853, explained in his own words the basis for White-European discrimination:

If you were to put the roto (literally "broken"), the gaucho, the cholo, the basic element of our popular masses, through the finest educational system; in one hundred years you would not make him an English worker who works, consumes, and lives comfortably and in a dignified manner.

— Juan B. Alberdi

The discrimination between European and non-European immigration established by Article 25 of the Constitution has survived all subsequent constitutional reforms (1860, 1868, 1898, 1949, 1957, 1972 and 1994).

Alberdi claimed that the "races which could improve the species" in Argentina were those that originated from Western Europe, chiefly Spain, England and France. Alberdi was also very partial to France where he spent much of his life in exile and where he died in 1884. In this way, despite the predominantly Hispanic and Latin culture of Argentina, Alberti proposed a semi-nordicist policy somewhat similar to the later White Australia policy and the United States Immigration Act of 1924.

Alberdi, who was a proponent of French being the national language of Argentina, believed that Latino and Christian traditions were enemies of progress and supported discrimination against Latin American and Jewish immigration.

On the other hand, Argentine racist ideology against Jews became stronger over time. The apex of this tendency occurred when the Argentina foreign minister during the presidency of Roberto M. Ortiz issued a secret order in 1938 to deny Jewish immigrants visas to Argentina.

=== Antisemitism ===
Leonardo Senkman, editor of the book Antisemitism in Argentina, stated:

In contemporary Argentina – home to the most significant community of Jews in Latin America – anti-Semitism has been an endemic and extremely complicated phenomena.

Serious acts of racism against Jews have been committed in Argentina, such as the Argentine Chancellor's secret order in 1938 to prevent the arrival of Jews on national territory and the terrorist attacks on the Israeli embassy in 1992 and the Asociación Mutual Israelita Argentina in 1994. Both attacks targeted Jewish institutions in Argentina, with Argentine investigations concluding that they were planned and carried out by actors operating from outside the country. The terrorist attacks against Jewish targets has sparked a debate between those who believe that they were not antisemitic acts and those who believe that the attacks were the "worst act of anti-Semitism since the second world war".

In an attempt to synthesize the positions of both sides of the debate, the researcher Daniel Lvovich has written:

The attack on the AMIA was one of the most important acts of anti-Semitism of recent times, but the flip side was that thousands of demonstrators took to the streets with signs that read "We are all Jews".

In 1937, during the government of Augustín P. Justo, the Argentine consul in Gdynia, Poland sent several notes to the Minister Carlos Saavedra Lamas under the heading "Jewish problem" that demonstrate the generalized antisemitic sentiment of the Argentine government. In a letter sent July 13, 1937, on the eve of the Nazi invasion, the consul wrote:

I am of the opinion that it would be preferable to prevent Jewish immigration to Argentina. The Jews are leaving Poland carrying a profound hatred of Christianity, and are prepared to commit the gravest of excesses.

During the military regimes in Argentina, and especially during the dictatorship known as the Proceso de Reorganización Nacional, serious acts of antisemitic persecution occurred. Some were tortured, degraded, and even murdered for the sole fact of being Jewish. In the secret detention centers it was common practice to burn the Star of David onto the bodies of Jewish prisoners. Ramon Camps, the Chief of Police in Buenos Aires, who allegedly kidnapped and tortured Jacobo Timerman, claimed that Zionists were enemies of Argentina and had a plan to destroy the country. This ideology was used as a pretext to implement illegal repressive methods to resolve what was referred to as "the Jewish issue".

Antisemitism in daily life is widely apparent in Argentina. A prime example of this occurs regularly at the Atlanta association football club located in the Villa Crespo neighborhood of Buenos Aires, a district that has a significant Jewish population. For several years now the fans of opposing teams root for their clubs by waving Nazi flags and throwing soaps onto the playing field.

A report by the DAIA revealed that discriminatory acts against Jews in Argentina rose 32% in 2006.

=== Racism against other Latin-Americans ===
Paraguayans and Bolivians were the two principal sources of Latin American immigrants to Argentina in 2007. It is estimated that almost 5% of the population in Argentina is from Paraguay or Bolivia, or has Bolivian or Paraguayan ancestors.

Another incident was the racially motivated murder of Marcelina Meneses and her ten-month-old son Josua Torrez who were pushed under a moving train near the Avellaneda station on July 10, 2001. The Bolivian community in Argentina protested with the slogan "Do not forget Marcelina".

== Legacy ==
=== Contemporary demographics ===
The current Argentine population reflects the former immigration policy conducted by the government in the 19th and 20th century only partially, considering that Italians and Spaniards were not intended to predominate as they do. There are also significant Germanic, Slavic, British, Arab Christian and French populations.

Argentina does not publish a complete official racial classification of its population. White Argentines are generally considered the country’s largest group, largely reflecting the major European immigration waves of the nineteenth and twentieth centuries, especially from Italy and Spain. Estimates have placed the white population at roughly 79–89%, although these figures vary by methodology. The 2022 census separately recorded 2.83% of the population as Indigenous or of Indigenous descent and 0.66% as Afro-descendant; most of the remaining population was not classified by race. Genetic studies also indicate substantial mixed ancestry, with European ancestry predominating alongside significant Indigenous and smaller sub-Saharan African contributions.

In 2001, Afro-Argentine activist Pocha Lamadrid and founder of the NGO África Vive collaborated with the Buenos Aires Ombudsman's Office to carry out an "Afro-Argentine census" in Buenos Aires, in parallel to the national census being held that year, as the official census did not include questions regarding race self-identification. According to Lamadrid, as of 2002 there were "at least 2 million" Argentines of African descent, but many of them ignore their background due to pervasive racism deeply entrenched in Argentine society. Lamadrid's activism contributed to the 2010 Argentine national census including a question on Afro-Argentine background.

== See also ==
- Afro-argentine
- Demographics of Argentina
- Stereotypes of Argentines
- Anti-Argentine sentiment
