= Geographical distribution of Ukrainian speakers =

Spread of the Ukrainian language in the first half of the 20th century

A Ukrainophone (Ukrainian: українськомовний, ukrayinskomovnyi) is a person who speaks the Ukrainian language either natively or by preference. At the same time the term is used in a more specialized meaning to describe the category of people whose cultural background is associated with the Ukrainian language regardless of territorial distinctions.

There are an estimated 41 million native speakers of Ukrainian worldwide (of whom 37.5 million or 91% live in Ukraine).

There are many Ukrainophone communities in neighbouring countries with Ukraine, due to the historical spread of ethnic Ukrainian populations in areas that later became a part of those states, including Belarus, Moldova (especially Transnistria), Poland, Hungary, Slovakia and Romania, as well as in continental nations and areas where Ukrainians had moved to in recent centuries or were deported to during the Soviet regime, such as Kazakhstan, the Far East, Sakhalin, Kuril Islands, Lithuania, Czech Republic, Germany, Italy, Croatia, Portugal, the U.K., etc. Additionally, there are large Ukrainophone immigrant communities in various parts of Canada, the United States (especially New York City, Baltimore) and Australia, and somewhat smaller communities in various nations of Latin America, such as Brazil, Argentina, Paraguay, and Venezuela.

== Ukraine ==
Share of the population of Ukraine's regions that indicated Ukrainian as their native language from 1959 to 2001.

Share of the rural population of Ukraine's regions that indicated Ukrainian as their native language from 1959 to 2001.

Share of the urban population of Ukraine's regions that indicated Ukrainian as their native language from 1959 to 2001.

Change in the proportion of the population of Ukraine's regions who consider Ukrainian their native language, from census to census between 1959 and 2001.

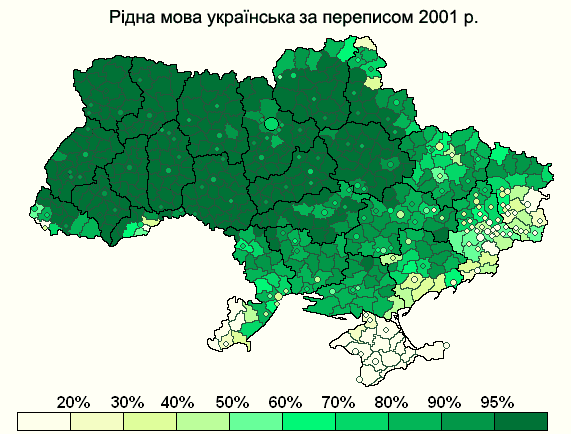
The share of the population who indicated Ukrainian as their native language in Ukraine's raions and cities of oblast significance (2001 Ukrainian census).

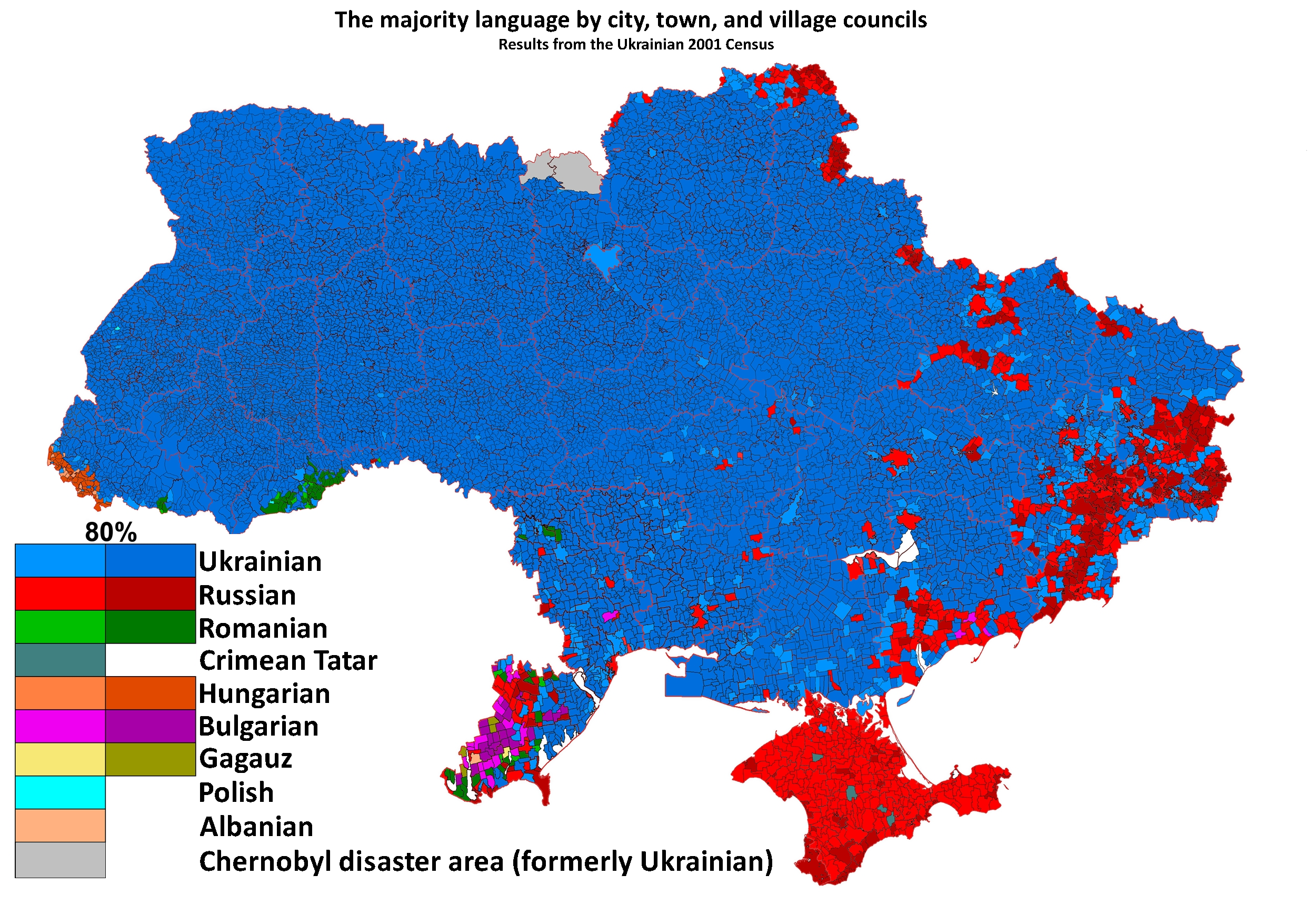
The most common native language in Ukraine's city, settlement, and village councils (2001 Ukrainian census).

According to Article 10 of Ukraine's constitution, Ukrainian is the country's only official language and the state ensures its comprehensive development and functioning in all spheres of social life throughout the entire territory of Ukraine.

According to the 2001 census, 67.5% of the population of Ukraine considered Ukrainian their native tongue, which is 2.8% more than in 1989 and 5.5% less than in 1959. Additionally, 42,374,848 residents of Ukraine (87.8% of the population) declared fluency in Ukrainian, including 97% of Ukrainians, 95% of Poles, over 60% of Jews, Belarusians and Romani, and over 50% of Russians, Greeks, Moldovans, and Armenians. The lowest level of Ukrainian language proficiency was recorded among Crimean Tatars (20%), Bulgarians (42%), and Romanians (44%).

After the 1989–1991 Ukrainian revolution and independence restoration in 1991, a policy of Ukrainisation began. The policy was weakened and attempts were made to cancel it altogether by the government of Viktor Yanukovych in 2010–2014. The 2012 law On the Principles of State Language Policy significantly weakened the positions of Ukrainian and granted regional language status to Russian and several other minority languages. Ukrainisation got a new lease of life after the Revolution of Dignity and the beginning of the war in Donbas. The 2019 Law of Ukraine "On protecting the functioning of the Ukrainian language as the state language" played an important role in cementing the status of Ukrainian as the main language in the Ukrainian state, enshrining the priority and compulsory use of Ukrainian in some areas of public life. Ukrainian significantly strengthened its position in society following the Russian invasion of Ukraine.

== Other countries ==
=== Europe ===
==== Belarus ====
According to the 1999 Belarusian census, Ukrainian as a native language was indicated by 42.9% of the Ukrainians of the Republic of Belarus, who according to the same census numbered 237 thousand.

According to the 2009 Belarusian census, Ukrainian was the native language for 51,039 people (0.54% of the country's population, 3rd place after Belarusian and Russian). Ukrainians among those who indicated Ukrainian as their native language were 46,403 (29.2% of the total Ukrainian population of the republic), and representatives of other nationalities — 4,636. Those speaking it at home made up 6,279.

According to the 2019 Belarusian census, the number of people who indicated Ukrainian as their mother tongue increased to 55,020 (0.58% of the country's population, 3rd place). Ukrainians among those who indicated Ukrainian as their native language were 46,386 (29.1% of the total Ukrainian population of the republic), and representatives of other nationalities — 8,634. The number of those speaking it at home increased to 8,055.

==== Moldova ====
According to the 2004 Moldovan census, Ukrainian was the native language of 186,394 people (5.51% of the country's population, 3rd place after Moldovan/Romanian and Russian). 130,114 people (3.85% of the population of the Republic of Moldova) indicated that they usually speak Ukrainian.

According to the 2014 Moldovan census, the number of people who indicated Ukrainian as their mother tongue decreased to 107,252 (3.82% of the country's population, 4th place after Moldovan/Romanian, Russian, and Gagauz), and the number of people who frequently speak Ukrainian decreased to 73,802 (2.63% of the country's population).

==== Romania ====
According to the 2002 Romanian census, 57,407 people (0.26% of Romania's population, 4th place after Romanian, Hungarian, and Roma) indicated Ukrainian as their mother tongue, of whom 33,506 were residents of the Maramureș County and 8,497 of the Suceava County.

According to the 2011 Romanian census, the number of people who indicated Ukrainian as their mother tongue decreased to 48,910 (0.24% of the country's population, 4th place), of whom 30,548 were residents of the Maramureș County and 6,097 of the Suceava County.

According to the 2021 Romanian census, the number of people who indicated Ukrainian as their mother tongue decreased to 40,861 (0.21% of the country's population, 4th place), of whom 25,446 were residents of the Maramureș County and 5,822 of the Suceava County.

==== Russia ====
According to the 2002 Russian census, 1,400,576 or 47.59% of Ukrainians in the Russian Federation indicated that they can speak languages other than Russian, of whom 1,267,207 indicated that they could speak Ukrainian. The total number of people who reported being able to speak Ukrainian was 1,815,210 (5th place after Russian, English, Tatar, and German).

According to the 2010 Russian census, the number of people who reported being able to speak Ukrainian decreased to 1,129,838. Additionally, 499,466 people identified Ukrainian as their mother tongue.

According to the 2021 Russian census, which was also conducted in the Russian-annexed Crimea, the number of those who reported speaking Ukrainian decreased to 627,106 (9th place). Those who reported using it in everyday life were 208,854 (23rd place). 294,952 reported that Ukrainian was their native language (21st place).

=== Americas ===
==== Brazil ====
Although most Brazilian Ukrainians have lived in Brazil for 4-5 generations and few have ever seen Ukraine, they have preserved their language and culture to a large degree in rural Paraná state. This has largely been due to the colossal efforts of the Ukrainian Churches. In contrast, among the Ukrainians in Argentina where the Church was not as strong as in Brazil, the Ukrainian language has largely disappeared. Among those who live in the colonies, or agricultural settlements, Ukrainian is widely spoken at home, in church, and the community, and today it is not uncommon for Ukrainian children to be unable to speak the Portuguese language until they begin school. Despite the Ukrainian language's widespread use in everyday speech, the ability to read and write is more limited, with over 50% of the Ukrainian population being unable to write in the Ukrainian language. Due to isolation from Ukraine, the Ukrainians of Brazil speak a 100-year-old form of the language's Galician or "Upper Dniestrian" dialect. Ninety percent of Church services are conducted in the Ukrainian language (in contrast, among the 700,000 ethnic Poles in Brazil only two churches use the Polish language). The Portuguese language has only come into wide use in the youngest generation — those who are younger than fifteen years old. The situation in urban areas is quite different. In the cities, Ukrainians tend to become assimilated into Brazilian culture and adopt the Portuguese language.

==== Canada ====
In Canada the term Ukrainophone is also used to differentiate Ukrainian language-speakers from ethnically Ukrainian Canadians in general. It refers to speakers of both the local Canadian Ukrainian dialect and Standard Ukrainian.

Most Ukrainian Canadians are assimilated to the North American majority and speak English. In the nomenclature of Canadian and Quebec language politics, this makes them Anglophones, but some Ukrainian Canadians may also be Francophones (French-speakers). If Ukrainian is a person's mother tongue then they are considered "allophone" (neither English- nor French-speaking). Therefore, a Ukrainophone in Quebec is also an allophone.

==== United States ====
The overwhelming majority of Ukrainophones in the United States reside in select areas of New York City and Baltimore, MD. In 2018 the number of Ukrainian diaspora in the US reached 1 million.
