= Vladimiro Tarnawsky =

Footballer (born 1939)

Vladimir Tarnawski
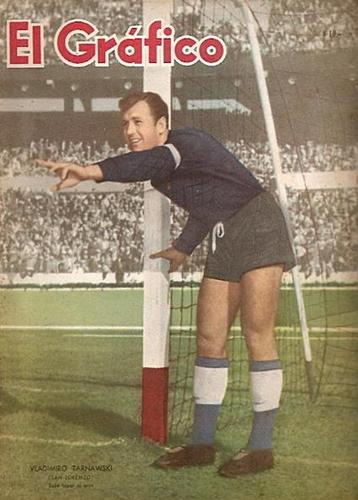
- Tarnawski on the cover of El Gráfico in 1960

Personal information
- Date of birth: 19 August 1939 (age 87)
- Place of birth: Kiev, Soviet Union (now Ukraine)
- Position: Goalkeeper

Senior career*
Years	Team	Apps	(Gls)
1951	El Porvenir	52	(0)
1957–1960	Newell's Old Boys	55	(0)
1960–1962	San Lorenzo	35	(0)
1963	Estudiantes LP	8	(0)
1964–1967	Philadelphia Ukrainians		
1968	Boston Beacons	17	(0)
1969	Philadelphia Spartans		
1970	Gotschee USC		
1972-1973	Philadelphia Spartans		
1974	Delaware Wings		
1975	Philadelphia Ukrainians		

International career
1959	Argentina	1	(0)
- * Club domestic league appearances and goals

Vladimiro Tarnawski (Russian: Владимир Тарнавский; Ukrainian: Володимир Тарнавський, romanized: Volodymyr Tarnavs'kyy; born 19 August 1939), also known as Vladimiro Tarnawsky and Walter Tarnawsky, and nicknamed Ruso (Spanish for Russian), is a retired Ukrainian Argentine football goalkeeper born in the Soviet Union.

== Career ==
Born in the Ukrainian SSR, Tarnawski began his professional playing career in Argentina with Club El Porvenir in 1951. He played for Newell's Old Boys from 1957 to 1960, Club Atlético San Lorenzo de Almagro from 1960 to 1962 and Estudiantes de La Plata in 1963. He also made one appearance for the Argentina national team, Chile's first victory against Argentina, on 18 November 1959.

Tarnawski finished his playing career in the United States, making 17 appearances for NASL side Boston Beacons during the 1968 season. He also played for Gotschee USC.
