= Belarusian Argentines =

Belarusian Argentins Беларусы ў Арґентыне Bielorrusos en Argentina
- (Belarus) (Argentina)

Total population
- 145,000

Languages
- Belarusian, Russian, Rioplatense Spanish

Religion
- Orthodox Christianity, Catholicism

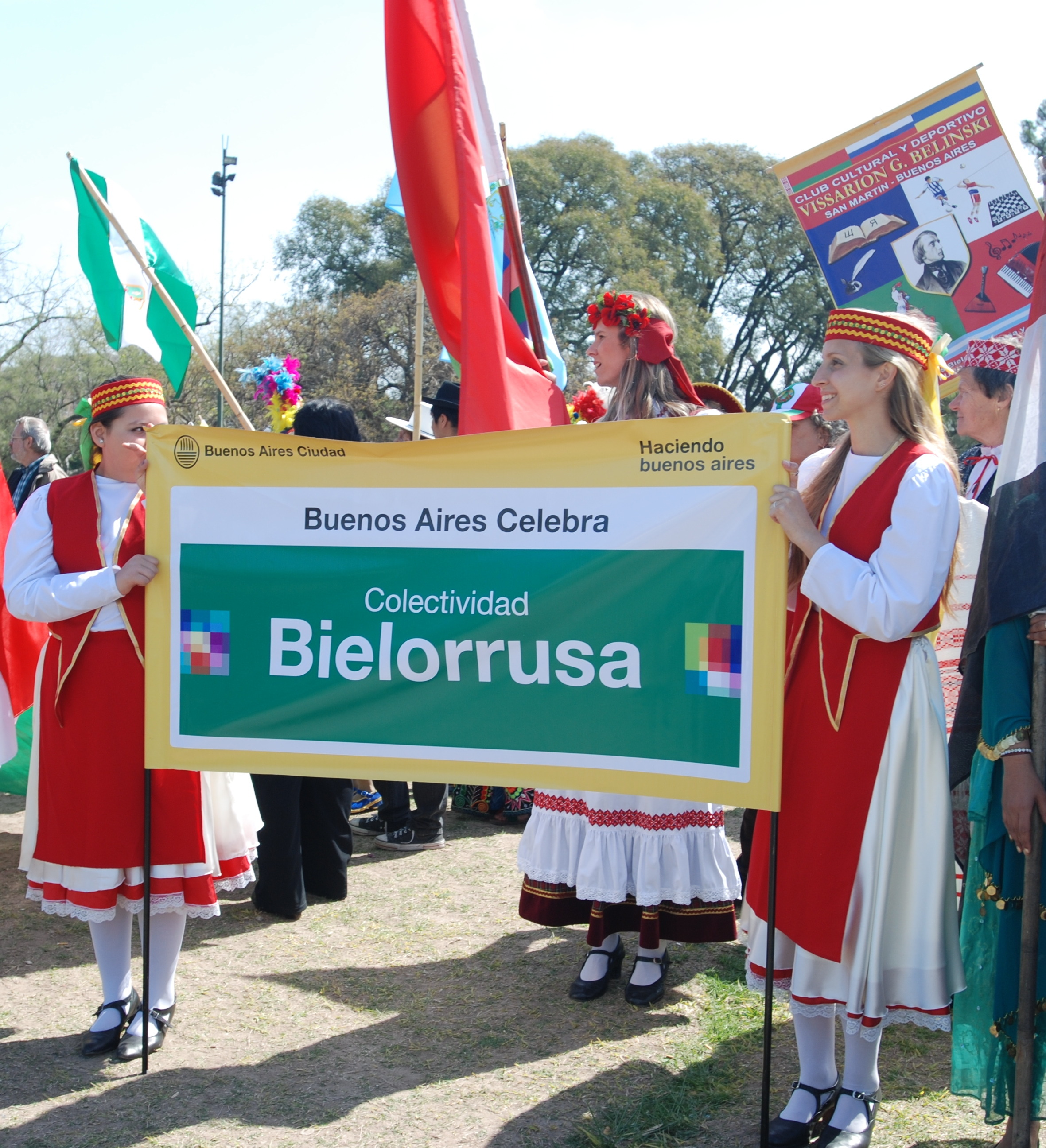
Belarusians of Argentina on the Immigrant Day, Buenos Aires, 2010

Belarusian Argentines (Belarusian: Беларусы ў Арґентыне, romanized: Biełarusy w Argentynie, Russian: Белорусы в Аргентине, romanized: Belorusy v Argentine, Spanish: Bielorrusos en Argentina) are a part of the Belarusian diaspora that consists of the Belarusians who emigrated to Argentina and their descendants. The community was formed in the 20th century, now it accounts for 7,000 people and about 145,000 descendants.

== Before World War I ==
Presumably the first emigrants from Belarus came to Argentina after French invasion of Russia (1812). A part of the Belarusians, who fought for Napoleon in the Lithuanian military unit (under the command of Knishevich and Rynkevich Generals), moved to France after the defeat. There were Argentinian agencies at that time that recruited military and civilian specialists. Some Poles and Belarusians further moved to Argentina to join the Argentinian army.

The theme of emigration from Belarus to Argentina before the World War I is insufficiently explored. The statistical immigration service in Argentina is recorded only since 1857. From that time and until 1915 161,422 people left the Russian Empire for Argentina. However, this statistic data does not contain any information concerning the ethnicity, only the country of origin. This is known for now that most of the emigrants were Jewish.

== Interwar period ==
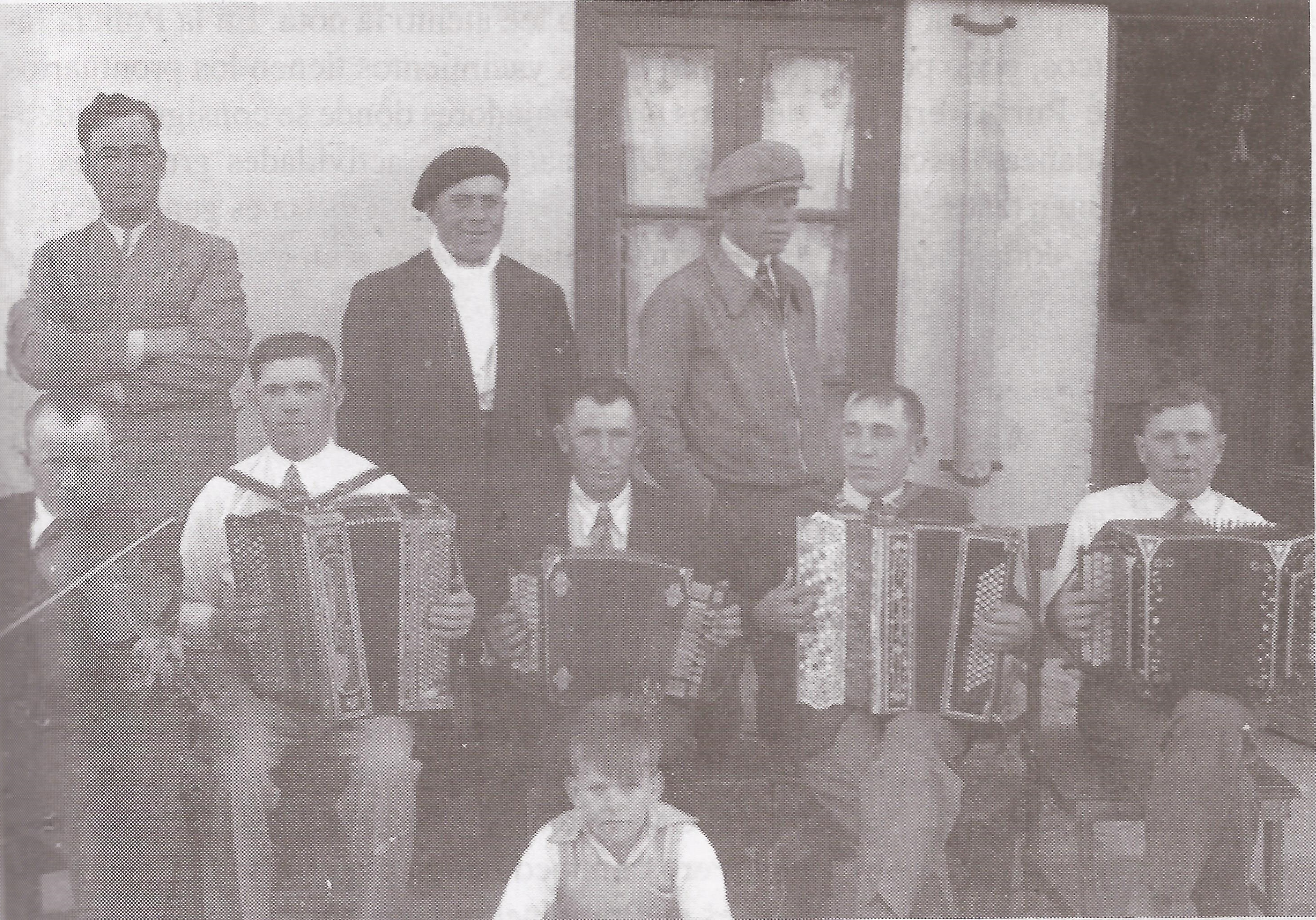
Musical ensemble of workers Belarusians, Comodoro Rivadavia, 1930s

During the interwar period only the emigration from West Belarus was possible. The emigration included mostly single men-peasants who were traveling to work, although there were also soldiers who fought together with Stanislav Bulak-Balakhovich. The number of Belarusians who emigrated during this period accounts for about 30,000.

As the Polish consulate was not interested in the problems of Belarusians, emigrants began to create associations. In 1934 "The Belarusian Cultural and Educational Association" was founded, in 1937 — "Belarusian Association "Culture"", and "Iwan Luckiewicz Belarusian Library" in 1938 — "The Belarusian Cultural Association "Belavezh"" ("Yakub Kolas" after the war). In 1939 the combination of all these unions created the "Belarusian Federation of associations in Argentina", to which later two more new associations joined. A theatrical group was organized there under the library, the group staged performances on the local scene and in neighboring Uruguay.

When in 1939 Poland was invaded by Germany 1,140 former Polish citizens (Poles, Ukrainians, Belarusians and Jews) volunteered for the Polish army.

== After World War II ==
In 1945 the Soviet Embassy in Uruguay was opened, and in 1946 — in Argentina. Soviet diplomats called the former citizens of the Western Ukraine and Western Belarus to take the old Polish passport in return for Soviet documents, according to which these people were promised to be taken back home. Many emigrants believed that Soviet propaganda. The fact was that those people were leaving Second Polish Republic and never lived under the Soviet regime, that was why they had idealistic idea about the Soviet Union. In addition there was a kind of euphoria associated with the end of the war and the victory of the Soviet Union in it. Moreover, part of old emigrants felt animosity towards new refugees from the post-war Soviet Union.

By 1950 the Belarusian community in Argentina reached its high point, there lived more than 30,000 Belarusians at that time.

In 1949 "Slavic Union in Argentina" — pro-communist Slavic organization created in 1941 and supported by the Soviet Union — increased its activities. The members of the "Union" held their demonstration, carried out provocations and organized assaults on the members of other Slavic national organizations. 14 members of the "Union" were later deported by the Argentine authorities to their homeland. Meanwhile, under the influence of the Soviet embassy propaganda Belarusian associations switched to the communist ideas. Under President Juan Perón however persecution of communists started and all pro-communist associations were prohibited.

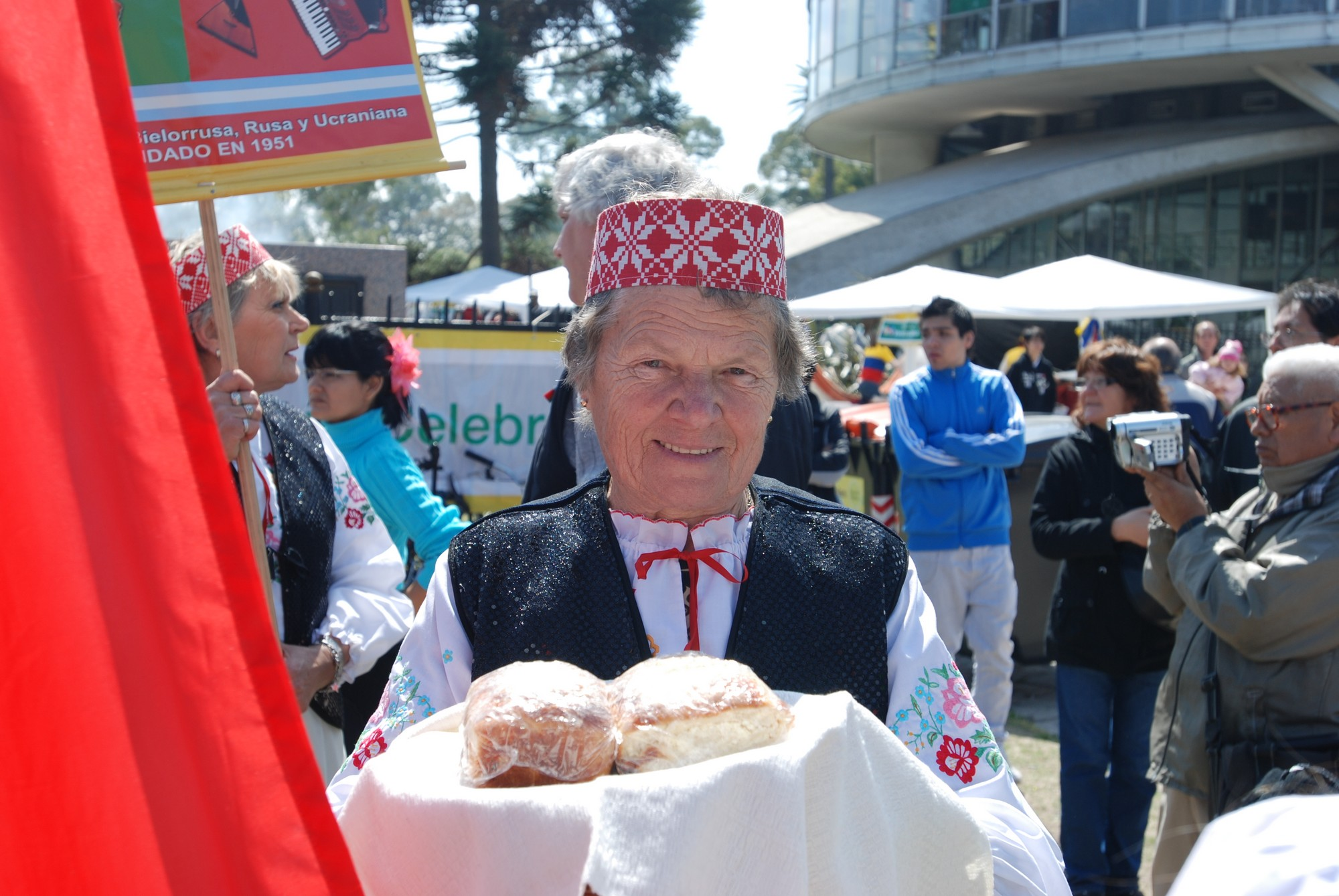
Immigrant Day, Buenos Aires, 2010

Later Soviet international societies emerged, they combined all the Soviet nations and people sympathetic with the Soviet regime. Such organizations were often called "cultural-sports clubs". The work of such organizations was periodically cut short as before 1983 there were military juntas that ruled in Argentina intermittently.

In 1955 the "amnesty law" was enacted in the Soviet Union, according to the law the citizens of interwar Poland were allowed to return to the Soviet Union. Around 2,000 Belarusians have taken the advantage of this opportunity, but about 200 of them came back to Argentina in the 1960s.

== Modern times ==
In 2010 "Kastus Kalinouski Belarusian Cultural Center" was opened in Llavallol (Greater Buenos Aires).

== See also ==
- Ukrainian in Argentina
- Polish in Argentina
- Russians in Argentina
