= Argentina–Ukraine relations =

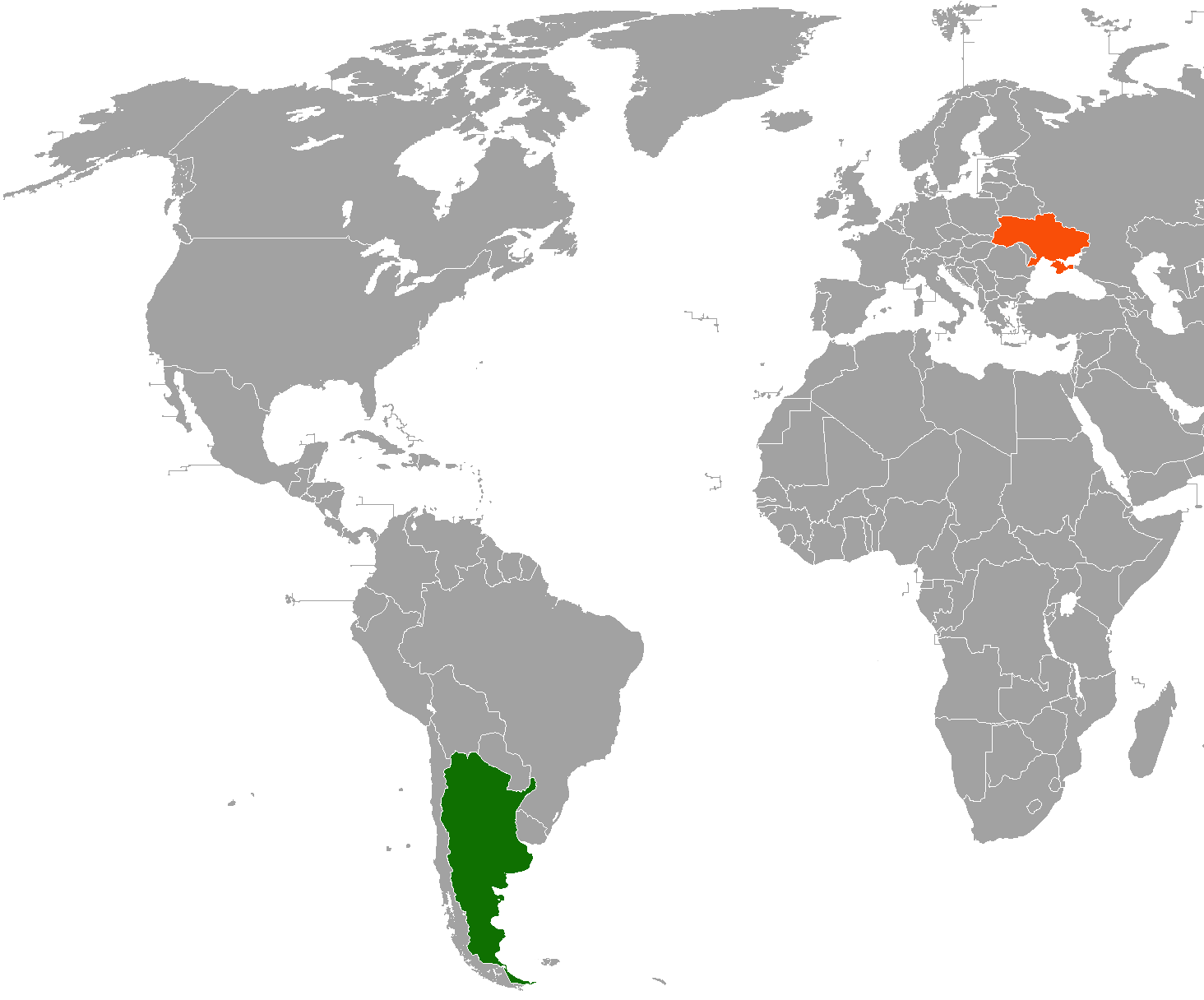
- Argentina: Ukraine

Diplomatic relations between the Argentine Republic and Ukraine have existed for decades. Argentina has an embassy in Kyiv, while Ukraine has an embassy in Buenos Aires. The importance of relations centers on the history of Ukrainian migration to Argentina. Ukrainians in Argentina form the second largest Ukrainian community in Latin America (after Brazil) numbering approximately 250,000 Ukrainians and their descendants.

== History ==
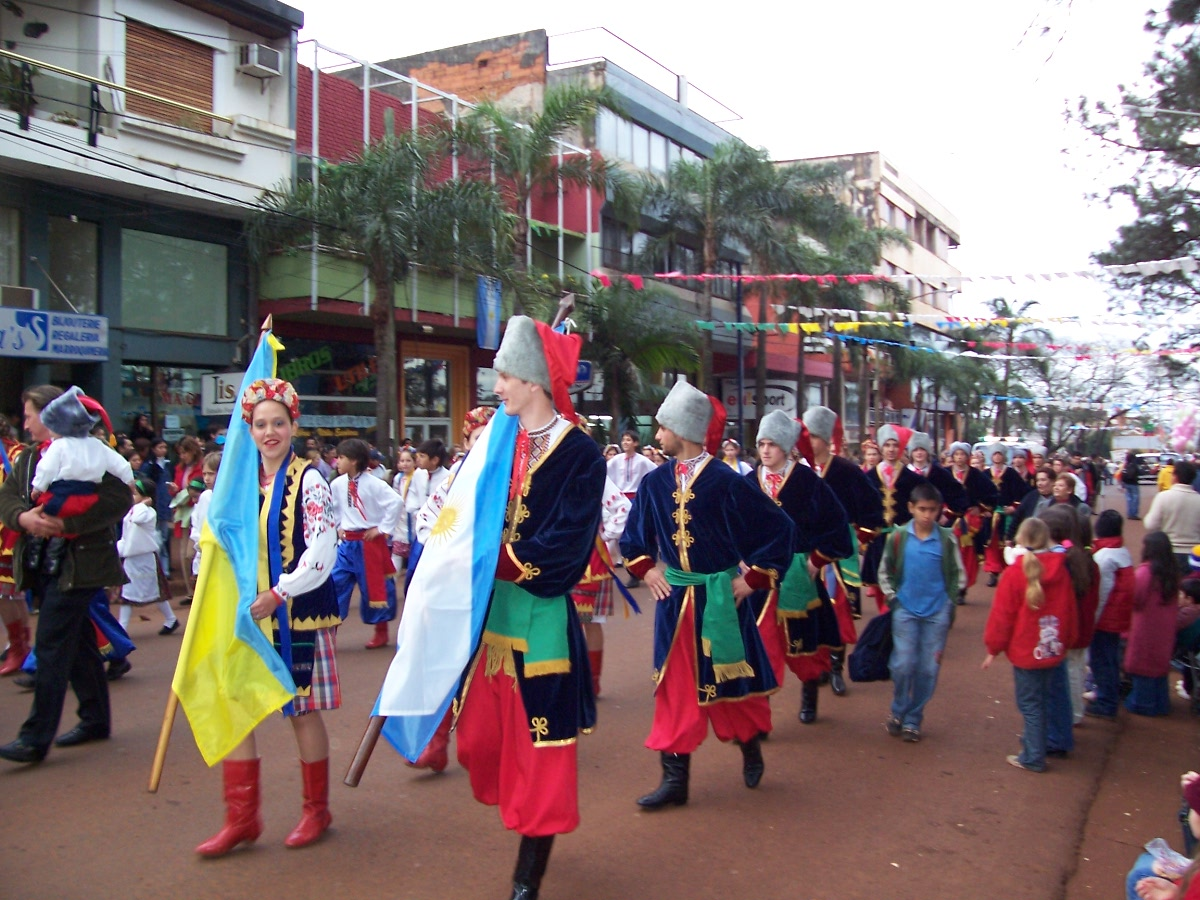
Argentines of Ukrainian descent during the inaugural parade of the Immigrant Festival in Oberá, Misiones.

Between 1897 and 1914, the first wave of Ukrainians arrived to Argentina with approximately 10,000 Ukrainians immigrating to the South American nation. Soon after World War I, approximately 70,000 Ukrainians immigrated to Argentina. In February 1921, Argentina became the first and only country in Latin America to recognize and establish diplomatic relations with Ukraine. In 1922, Ukraine lost its independence and became part of the Soviet Union. Soon after World War II, an additional 6,000 Ukrainians immigrated to Argentina.

On 5 December 1991, Argentina recognized the independence of Ukraine after the Dissolution of the Soviet Union. On 6 January 1992, Argentina and Ukraine established diplomatic relations. In 1993, both nations opened embassies in each other's respective capitals. In 1995, Ukrainian President Leonid Kuchma paid an official visit to Argentina. In 1998, Argentine President Carlos Menem paid an official visit to Ukraine.

During the Annexation of Crimea by the Russian Federation in February–March 2014, Argentina as a non-permanent member of the United Nations Security Council, voted on a draft resolution condemning the 2014 referendum in Crimea. In March 2014, Argentina abstained from the vote for the United Nations General Assembly Resolution 68/262 entitled "Territorial integrity of Ukraine". The government of former Argentine President Cristina Fernández de Kirchner stated there were 'double standards' by the United Kingdom and the United States for condemning the referendum in Crimea but supporting the referendum in the Falkland Islands. Argentina has called for the "integrity of Ukraine" and believes that Crimea should be returned to Ukraine.

In September 2016, Argentine President Mauricio Macri and Ukrainian President Petro Poroshenko met during the United Nations General Assembly in New York City. In 2016, both nations celebrated 25 years since re-establishing diplomatic relations.

On December 10th, 2023, Ukrainian President Volodymyr Zelenskyy visited the inauguration of newly elected Argentine president Javier Milei. During his visit, he thanked Milei for his strong stance in support of Ukraine. He also asked him to help organise the Ukraine-Latin America summit.

== Invasion of Ukraine ==
As part of assistance during the 2022 invasion of Ukraine, Argentina sent twelve shipments of humanitarian aid directly to Ukraine.

In February 2023, the Argentinian foreign ministry said in a statement "Argentina reaffirms its commitment to the principles of sovereignty and territorial integrity of states and human rights, permanent pillars of our country's foreign policy, it rejects the use of force as a mechanism to resolve conflicts and, in this way, reiterates its condemnation of Russia's invasion of Ukrainian territory." In February 2024, Argentina donated two Mi-171E helicopters to Ukraine. Argentina originally acquired these helicopters to resupply its Antarctic stations but unable to acquire parts to repair the helicopters to continue their operations due to sanctions against Russia. Argentina is also considering to donate five mothballed Dassault-Breguet Super Étendard fighter jets to Ukraine.

In February 2025, Argentina shifted its stance on Ukraine, abstaining from supporting Ukraine's United Nations General Assembly Resolution ES-11/7 that condemned Russian aggression and affirmed commitment to Ukrainian territorial integrity, in order to align with the stance of the new administration in the United States. It also co-sponsored a rival U.S. resolution advocating for peace between Ukraine and Russia.

== High-level visits ==
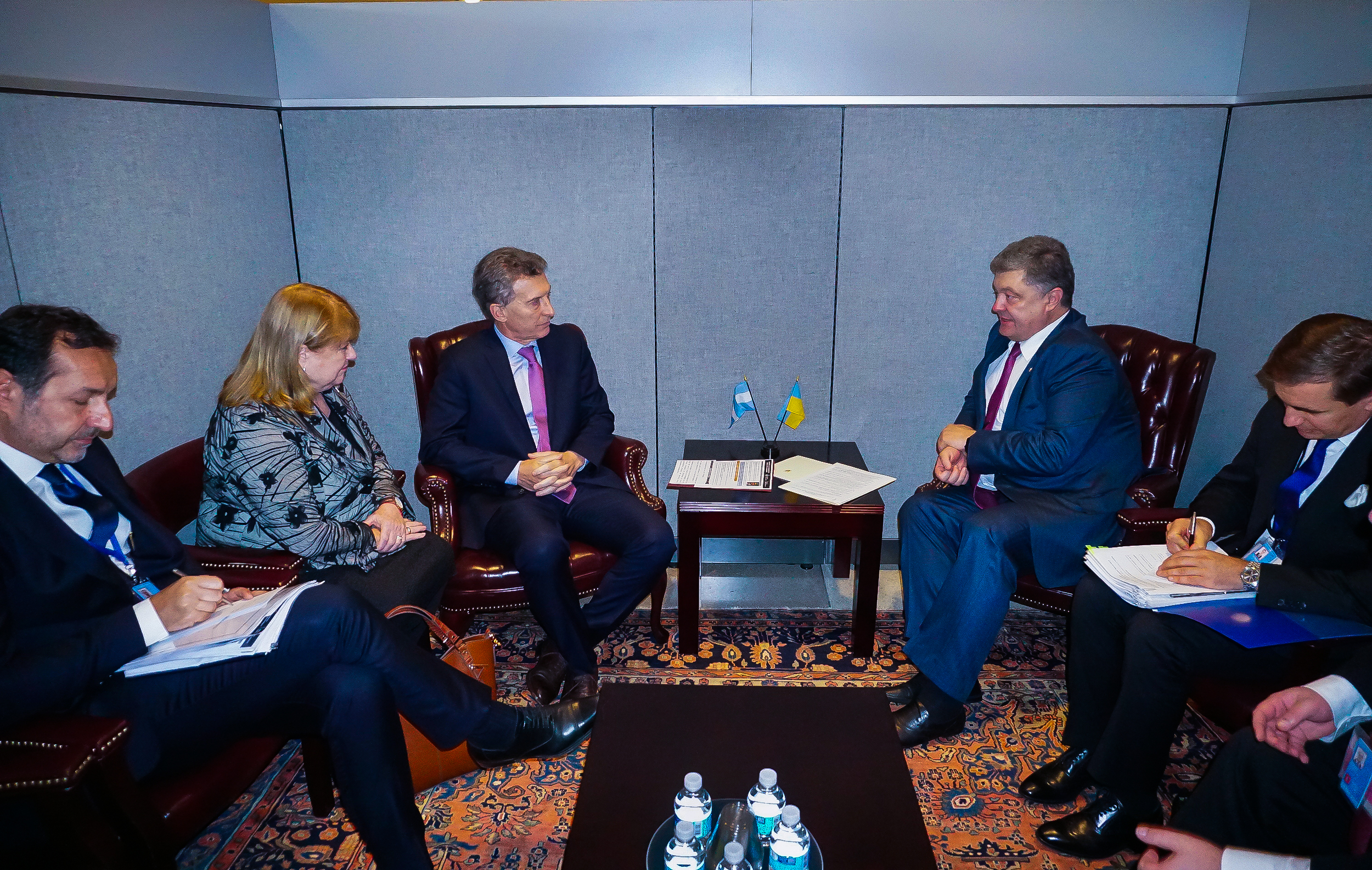
Argentine President Mauricio Macri and Ukrainian President Petro Poroshenko meeting at the United Nations in New York City, 2016.

Presidential visits from Argentina to Ukraine

- President Carlos Menem (1998)

Presidential visits from Ukraine to Argentina

- President Leonid Kuchma (1995)
- President Volodymyr Zelenskyy (2023)

== Bilateral agreements ==
Both nations have signed several bilateral agreements such as an Agreement on the Protection of Investments (1995); Agreement on Trade and Economic Cooperation (1996); Treaty on Friendly Relations and Cooperation (2000); Agreement on Abolition of Visas (2011) and an Agreement for mutual recognition of higher education degrees from both nations (2015).

== Trade ==
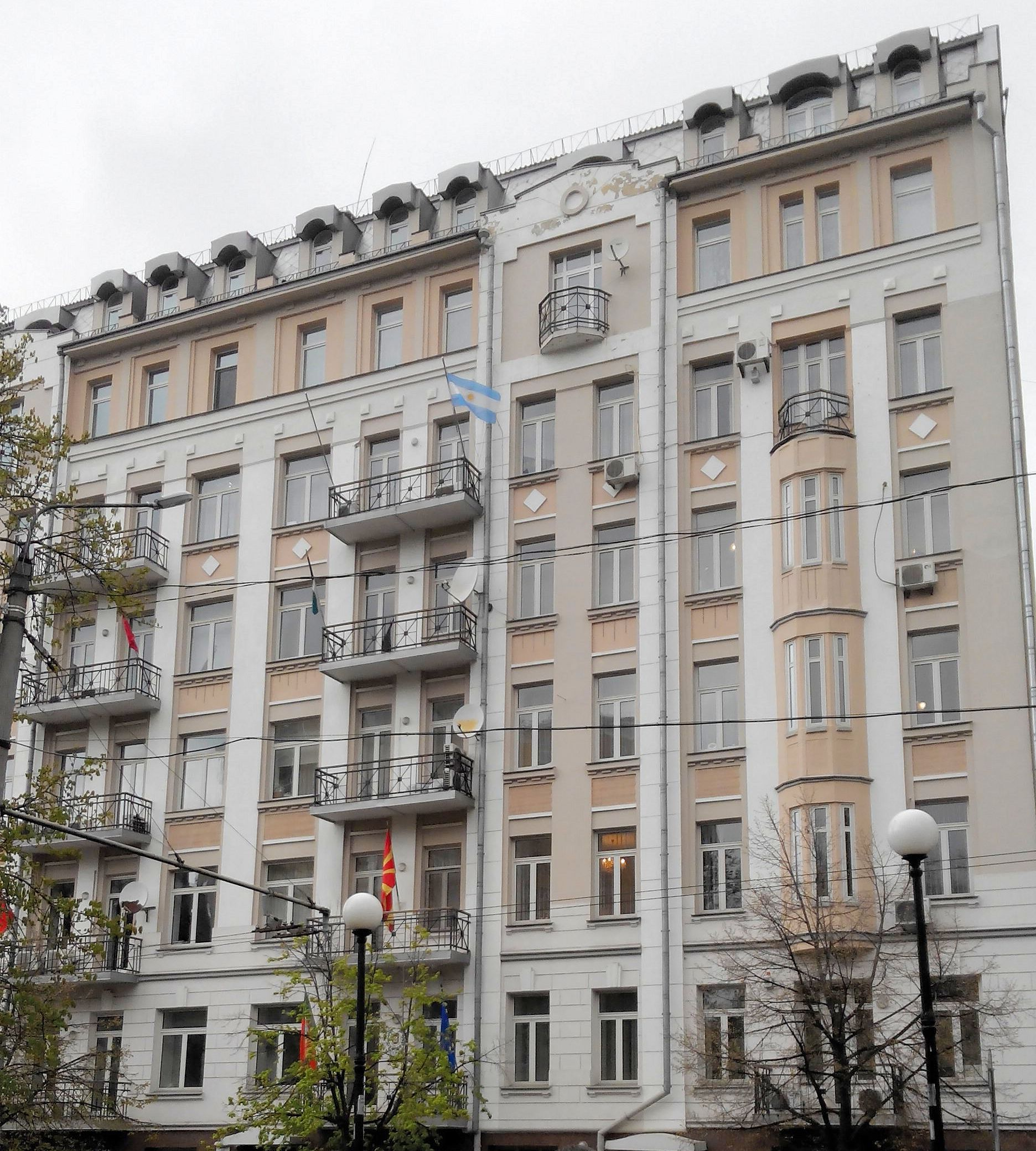
Building hosting the Embassy of Argentina in Kyiv

In 2016, trade between Argentina and Ukraine totaled US$60.5 million. Argentina's main exports to Ukraine include: fish and crustaceans; fruit and nuts; seeds and oleaginous fruits; tobacco and its substitutes. Ukraine's main exports to Argentina include: fertilizers, ferrous metals and machinery.

== Diplomatic missions ==
- Argentina has an embassy in Kyiv.
- Ukraine has an embassy in Buenos Aires.

== See also ==
- Foreign relations of Argentina
- Foreign relations of Ukraine
- Ukrainian Argentines
