= Ukrainians in Paraguay =

Ukrainians in Paraguay Українці Парагваю (Ukrainian)
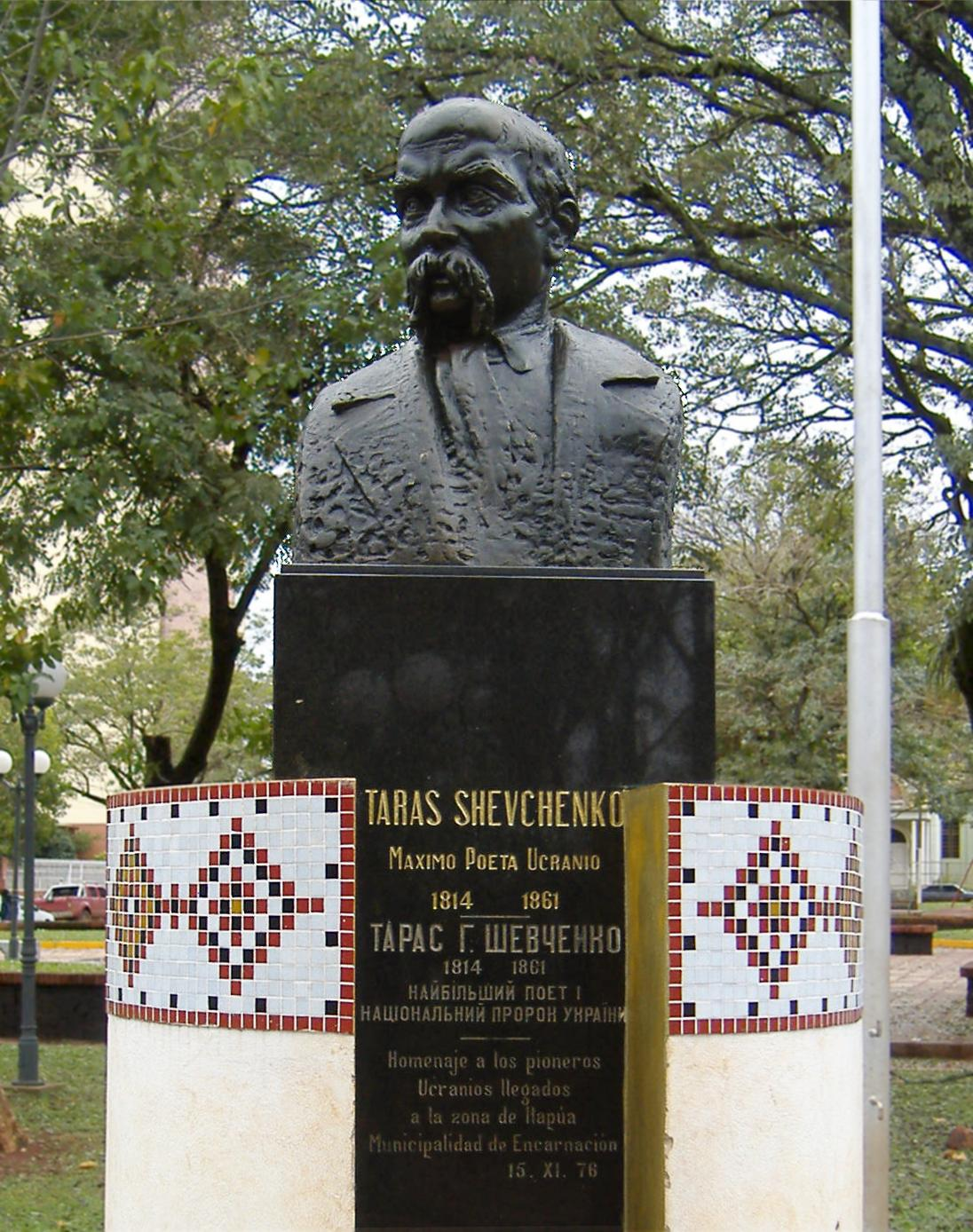
- A bust and plaque honouring Ukrainian national poet Taras Shevchenko in the city of Encarnación, Paraguay. Beneath the biographical data (in Spanish and Ukrainian), the plaque reads: Homage to the Ukrainian pioneers who came to the area of Itapúa.

Total population
- 80,000

Regions with significant populations
- Itapúa, Alto Paraná, Asunción

Languages
- Spanish, Ukrainian

Religion
- Christianity, Judaism

Related ethnic groups
- Ukrainian diaspora, Ukrainian Argentines, Ukrainian Brazilians, Ukrainian Venezuelans and Ukrainian Americans

Ukrainians in Paraguay are an ethnic minority in Paraguay. In the mid-1990s, 5,000 to 8,000 Ukrainians lived in Paraguay, clustered in small communities near the southeastern city of Encarnacion, which borders the Argentine province of Misiones (the heartland of Ukrainian immigration to that country). The majority of Ukrainians in Paraguay work as farmers, cultivating rice, corn, wheat and yerba mate.

== History ==
Ukrainians settled in Paraguay much later than they did in neighboring Brazil and Argentina, whose Ukrainian settlements date to the late nineteenth century. The first large groups of Ukrainians who settled in Paraguay arrived from neighboring Argentina in the late 1920s during an economic crisis in that country. These migrants had been originally from the Volhynia region in northwestern Ukraine, and named their settlement Nueva Volyn or New Volhynia. They were joined, in the late 1930s, by immigrants coming directly from the Polesia, Volhynia, Galicia and Transcarpathia regions of Ukraine. Following World War II, several hundred Ukrainian refugees arrived from displaced-persons camps in Europe as well as from the Ukrainian exile community in China and Manchuria which was forced to flee Communist invasion. The origin of most of the Ukrainian settlers have resulted in Paraguay being one of the few countries in the Ukrainian diaspora outside the former Soviet Union where the majority of people belong to the Orthodox rather than the Catholic Church. The Ukrainian immigrants gave Ukrainian names such as Nova Volyn or Tarasivka to their settlements but were forced to change those names to Spanish-language ones by the Paraguayan government. By the late 1940s there were approximately 10,000 Ukrainians living in Paraguay., currently there is an estimate of 40000 Ukrainians living in Paraguay, according to the website of the Ukrainian World Congress.

Subsequently, many Ukrainians from Paraguay, particularly the intelligentsia, emigrated to Argentina, Canada or the United States. Those who remained continue to attend Ukrainian Churches but have otherwise largely assimilated into Paraguayan society. Many of them have become prosperous, owning large tracts of land and leasing it to others.

== Society ==
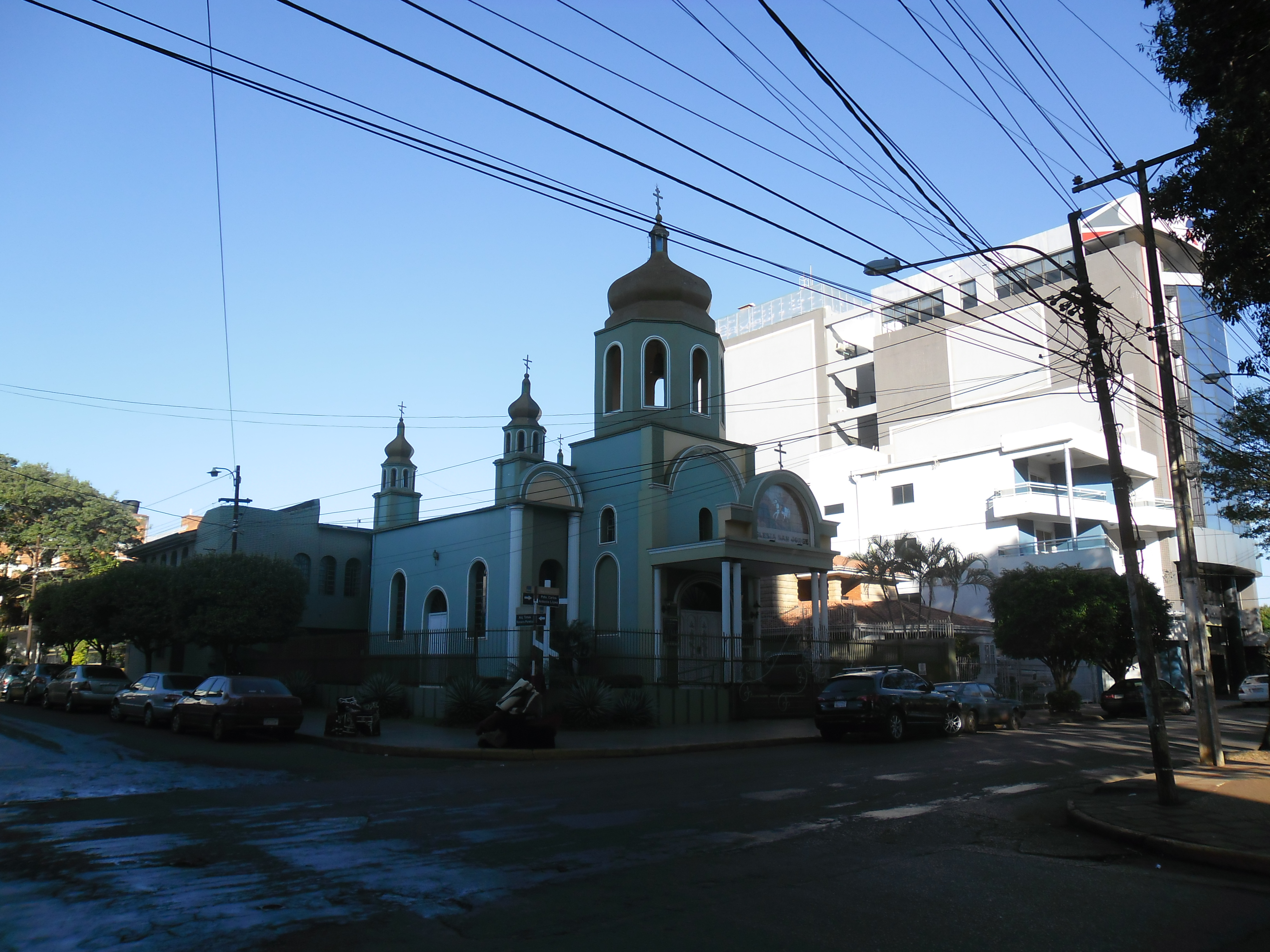
Orthodox Church in the city centre of Encarnación

Itapúa is the heartland of the Ukrainian Paraguayan community. Encarnación, which boasts a Ukrainian Community Centre, an Orthodox and a Catholic church, is the centre of Ukrainian community life in Paraguay. During the late 1930s the Ukrainian Prosvita society organized Ukrainian reading rooms, libraries and community centres. The Ukrainian youth organization operated until 1955. In the 1970s, during a ceremony attended by Paraguayan dictator Alfredo Stroessner, a statue to Ukrainian poet Taras Shevchenko was unveiled in the city. Generally, Ukrainian community and cultural life - with the exception of the churches - has declined in Paraguay due to the emigration of much of the intelligentsia to Argentina and North America.

In terms of religion, over half of Paraguayan Ukrainians belong to the Ukrainian Autocephalous Orthodox Church. Approximately 30% belong to the Ukrainian Greek Catholic Church and the rest belong to Baptist, Stundite or Mennonite Churches. There are currently six Orthodox parishes in Paraguay.

== See also ==
- Paraguay–Ukraine relations
- Ukrainian Canadian
