= Ukrainian Argentines =

Argentines of Ukrainian birth or descent

Українці aргентини (Ukrainian) Ucraniano-argentinos (Spanish)
- (Argentina) (Ukraine)
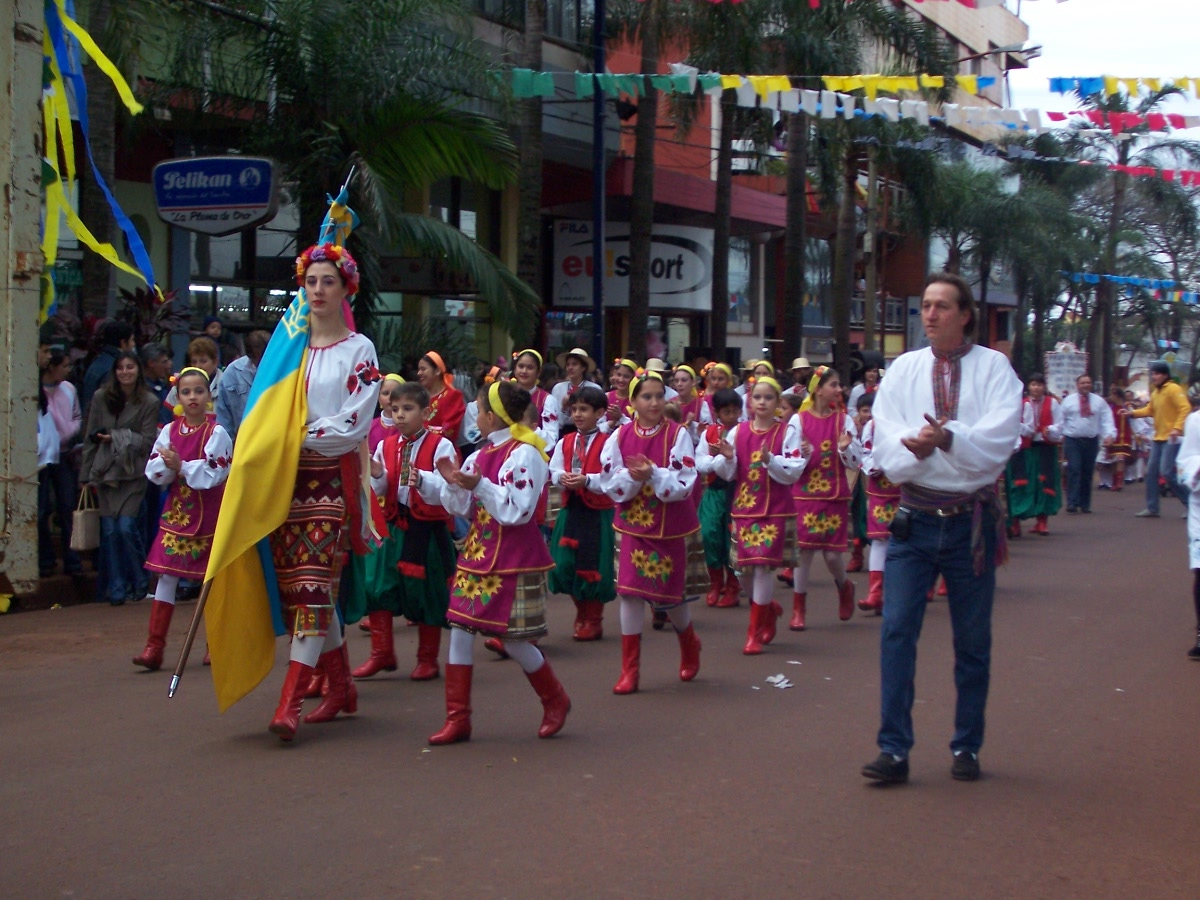
- Ukrainian Argentines in parade in Misiones

Total population
- 4,811 (by birth, 2023) + 1,000,000 (by ancestry); 3,5% of Argentina's population

Regions with significant populations
- Predominantly in the Pampas, the Northeast and the Patagonia

Languages
- Spanish; Ukrainian

Religion
- Ukrainian Catholicism; Ukrainian Roman Catholics; Ukrainian Orthodoxy; Ukrainian Protestants; Judaism

Related ethnic groups
- Ukrainian people; Ukrainian Brazilians; Ukrainian Paraguayans

Ukrainian Argentines (Ukrainian: Українці Арґентини, Ukrayintsi Argentyny, Spanish: Ucranio-argentinos) are Argentine citizens of Ukrainian descent or Ukraine-born people who reside in Argentina, an ethnic minority in Argentina. Estimates of the number of Ukrainian Argentines range up to 1,000,000 of the Argentine population of 47 million. Currently, the main concentrations of Ukrainians in Argentina are in the Greater Buenos Aires area, with at least 100,000 people of Ukrainian descent, the province of Misiones (the historical heartland of Ukrainian immigration to Argentina), with at least 55,000 Ukrainians, and the province of Chaco with at least 30,000 Ukrainians. In Misiones Ukrainians constitute approximately 9% of the province's total population. In comparison to Ukrainians in North America, the Ukrainian community in Argentina (and in Brazil) tends to be more descended from earlier waves of immigration, is poorer, more rural, has less organizational strength, and is more focused on the Church as the center of cultural identity. Most Ukrainian Argentines speak Spanish and not Ukrainian, although they continue to maintain their ethnic identity.

== History ==
There were four waves of Ukrainian immigration to Argentina: pre-World War I, with about 10,000 to 14,000 immigrants, post-World War I to World War II, including approximately 50,000, post-World War II, with 5,000 immigrants, and the post-Soviet immigration, which is estimated to number approximately 4,000.

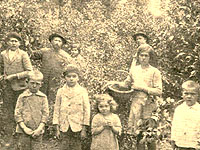
Ukrainians harvesting yerba mate in Misiones province, 1920

The first wave of Ukrainian immigration to Argentina included 12-14 families from Eastern Galicia (at the time part of Austria-Hungary) in 1897. When the immigrants arrived in the country, the Argentine government sent them to Misiones Province, where they settled in Apóstoles. Their settlement there was part of the local governor's strategy of building up European immigration in his province as a way of preventing neighboring Brazil's claims on the region. The settlers were granted land allotments of 50 hectares (124 acres) in two identical lots, with one lot being used for agriculture and the other for cattle breeding. Initially, they struggled with adapting to climatic conditions quite different from those of their native Ukraine, and eventually largely switched to tending crops that were appropriate to their new homes, such as sugar cane, rice, tobacco, and especially yerba mate, an infused beverage of southern South America, as proper crops. Indeed, the first person to grow tea in the province of Misiones was Volodymyr Hnatiuk, a Ukrainian immigrant. Ultimately, at least 10,000 Ukrainians from Galicia settled in Misiones before the onset of World War I. At this time, an estimated 4,000 Ukrainians also settled in Buenos Aires.

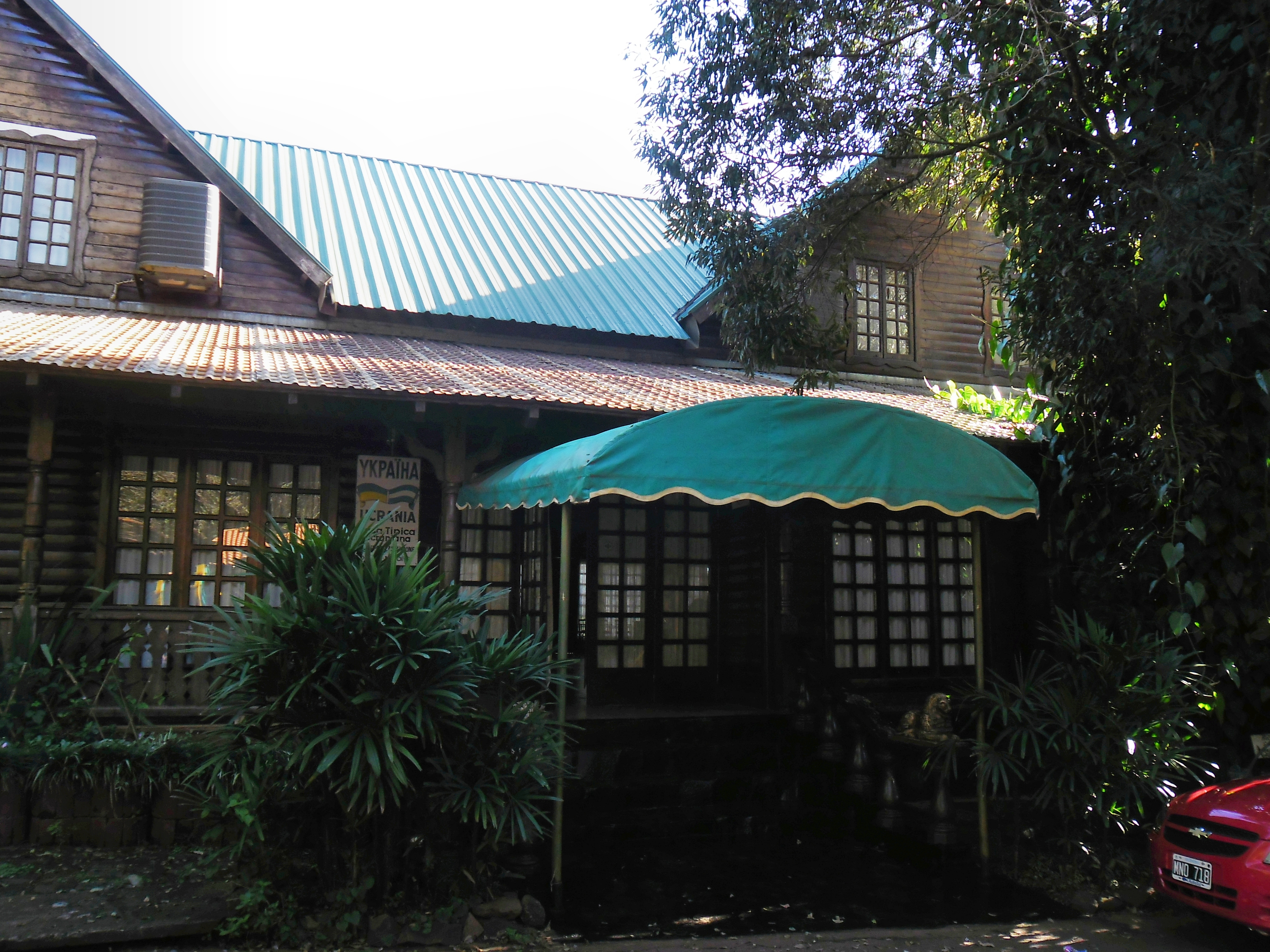
The "Ukrainian House" in Oberá, Misiones. This province was one of the largest recipients of Ukrainian immigrants in the country.

The largest number of Ukrainians migrated to Argentina between the two world wars. This wave of emigrants, whose number is estimated at between 50,000 and 70,000 people, was much more geographically diverse, and included many people from Orthodox areas of Ukraine such as Volhynia and Bukovina. It also included more educated or politically oriented people who had been involved in Ukraine's struggle for independence. Approximately half of this wave of immigrants settled in Buenos Aires, while the remainder strengthened the Ukrainian population in Misiones Province or created new Ukrainian settlements in other agricultural regions such as in Chaco Province.

Approximately 5,000-6,000 Ukrainians fleeing Communism entered Argentina between 1946 and 1950. Many of them were university professors, military personnel, skilled workers, or technicians. Some of these educated immigrants contributed to the Argentine government's industrialization policies.

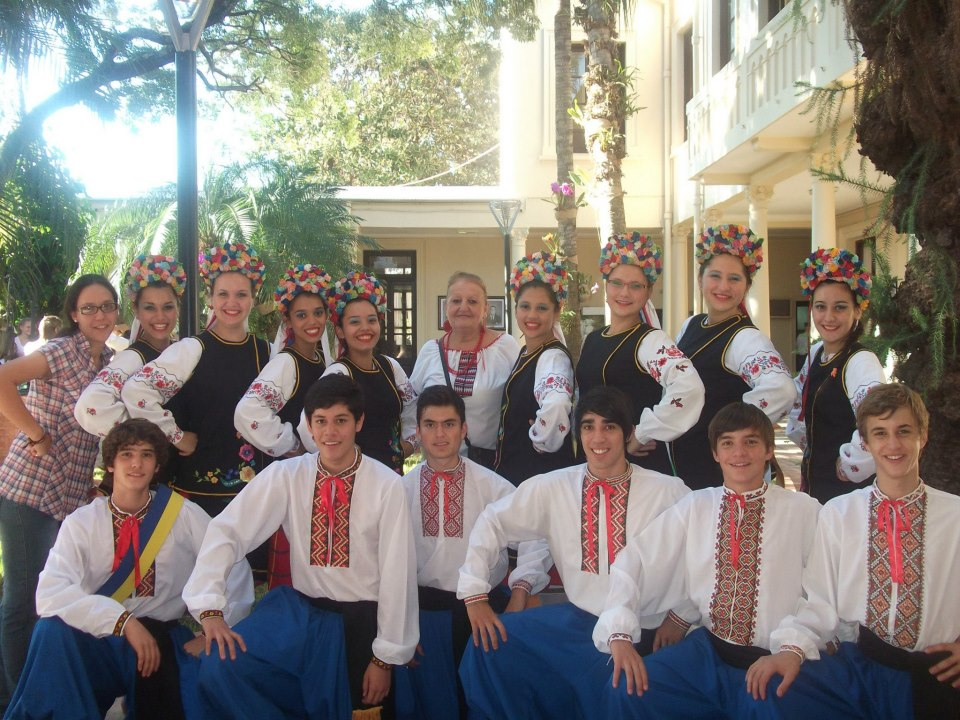
Oberá's Ukrainian Barvinok ballet cast.

An estimated 3,000 highly educated Ukrainians, many from the third wave, left Argentina for the United States or Canada in the 1950s due to greater economic opportunities. Another 3,000 Ukrainians left Argentina for the Soviet Union during the late 1950s, after having been promised a "prosperous life in the homeland." Only a third of the latter group were able to return to Argentina. These demographic losses were compensated for by small numbers of Ukrainians moving to Argentina from Paraguay and Uruguay.

Following the fall of the Soviet Union, since the 1990s approximately 4,000 Ukrainians have moved to Argentina from Ukraine. Although not as numerous as in the past, the Ukrainian immigration is still present.

== Society ==
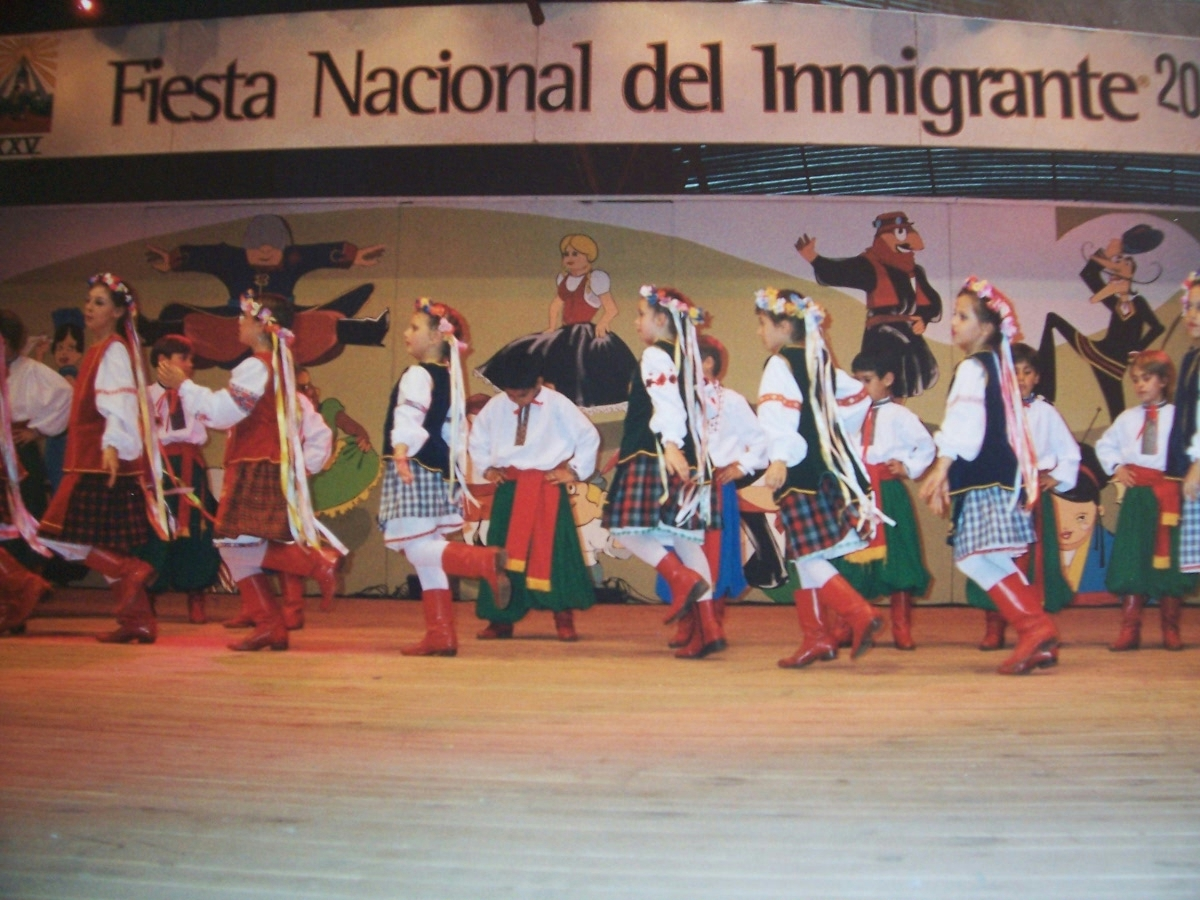
Ukrainian performers during Immigrant's Festival in Misiones province

=== Religion ===
==== Ukrainian Catholics ====
The first Ukrainians to Argentina who settled in Misiones came from a predominantly Catholic region of Ukraine, Galicia. However, the local Argentine (Latin Rite) Roman Catholic Church opposed the creation of a separate Ukrainian Catholic Church. As a result, for the first ten years of their settlement, Argentine Ukrainians Catholics did not have their own Eastern-rite Catholic priests, and were subject to intense missionary activities by Polish Roman Catholics. In response, many of them converted to Eastern Orthodoxy, whose rituals are virtually identical to those of Ukrainian Catholicism. Without the help of their Mother Church in Galicia, local Ukrainians built their own churches, chapels, and homes for priests, and petitioned church authorities in Galicia to send priests to them. Finally, in 1908, Father K. Bzhukhovsky was sent to Misiones from Brazil. He was succeeded in the province of Misiones by several more priests from Ukraine. In 1922, the Ukrainian parishes in Misiones were visited by the head of the Ukrainian Catholic Church, Metropolitan Andrey Sheptytsky of Lviv. The first Ukrainian Catholic Church in Buenos Aires region was built in 1940 and in the city in 1948. In 1978, the Ukrainian Catholic Church in Argentina was granted its own Eparchy (Eastern-rite equivalent of a diocese). Andriy Sapeliak was the first Ukrainian Bishop in Argentina.

Currently, over 120,000 of Ukrainians in Argentina are Ukrainian Catholics, comprising approximately 50% of Ukrainian Argentines. Misiones Province, the heartland of Ukrainian immigration to Argentina, has 60 Ukrainian Catholic Churches and chapels. In April 1987 Pope John Paul II visited the Ukrainian Catholic community in Buenos Aires.

==== Orthodox ====
The first Orthodox Ukrainians in Argentina were converts from the Ukrainian Catholic Church and came under the jurisdiction of the Russian Orthodox Church. Many Orthodox immigrants who came to Argentina from Ukraine between the World Wars, among whom were several priests, who created parishes in Buenos Aires and surrounding areas. The newcomers generally belonged to the Ukrainian Autocephalous Orthodox Church.

Approximately 30% of Ukrainian Argentines are currently Orthodox.

=== Education ===
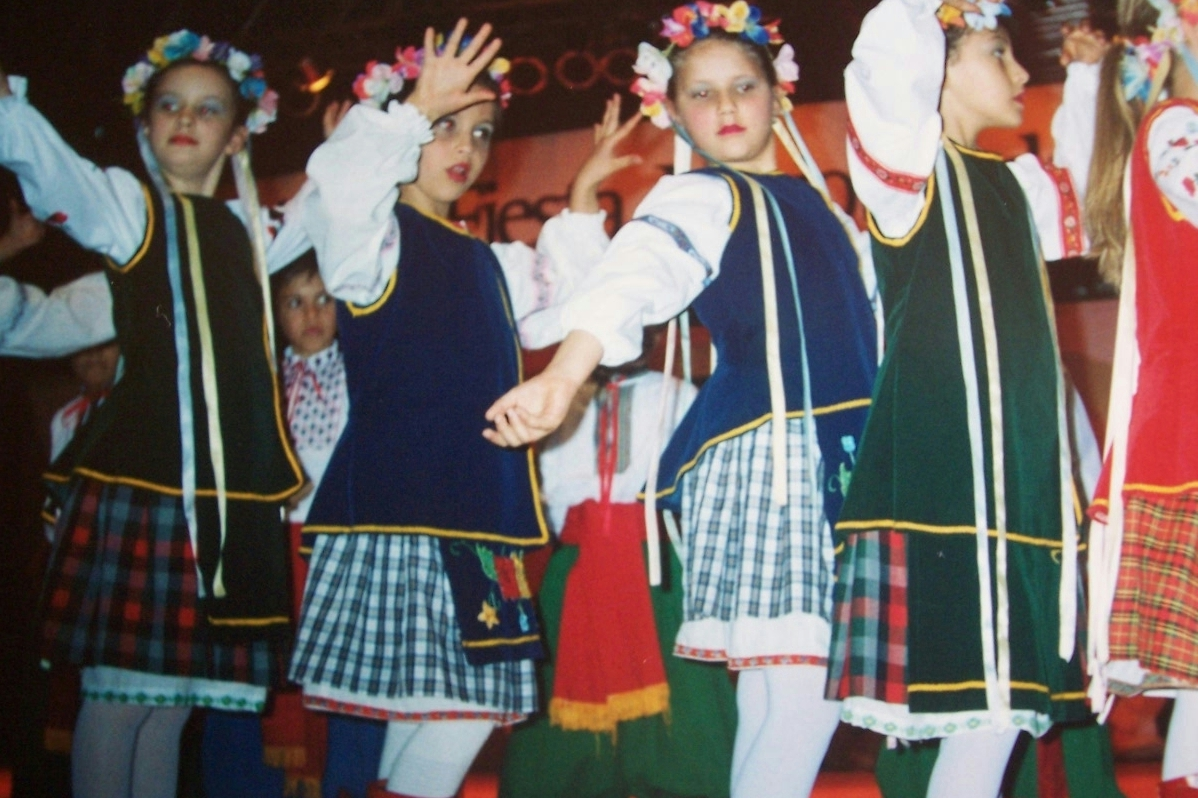
A group of Ukrainian Argentine girls dancing.

Ukrainian all-day elementary and secondary schools, in which classes are taught in Spanish and follow the Argentine curriculum but also have Ukrainian subjects several times per week, exist in the cities of Apóstoles, Posadas, and Buenos Aires. Ukrainian all-day elementary schools exist in Berisso and San Vicente (both towns in the Buenos Aires region). These schools are all run by the Ukrainian Catholic Church. In addition, Argentina's branch of the Prosvita operates Ukrainian Saturday schools.

Argentina's Ukrainian community also has several folk dancing ensembles, as well as the Ukrainian scouting organization Plast.

== Notable Ukrainian Argentines ==
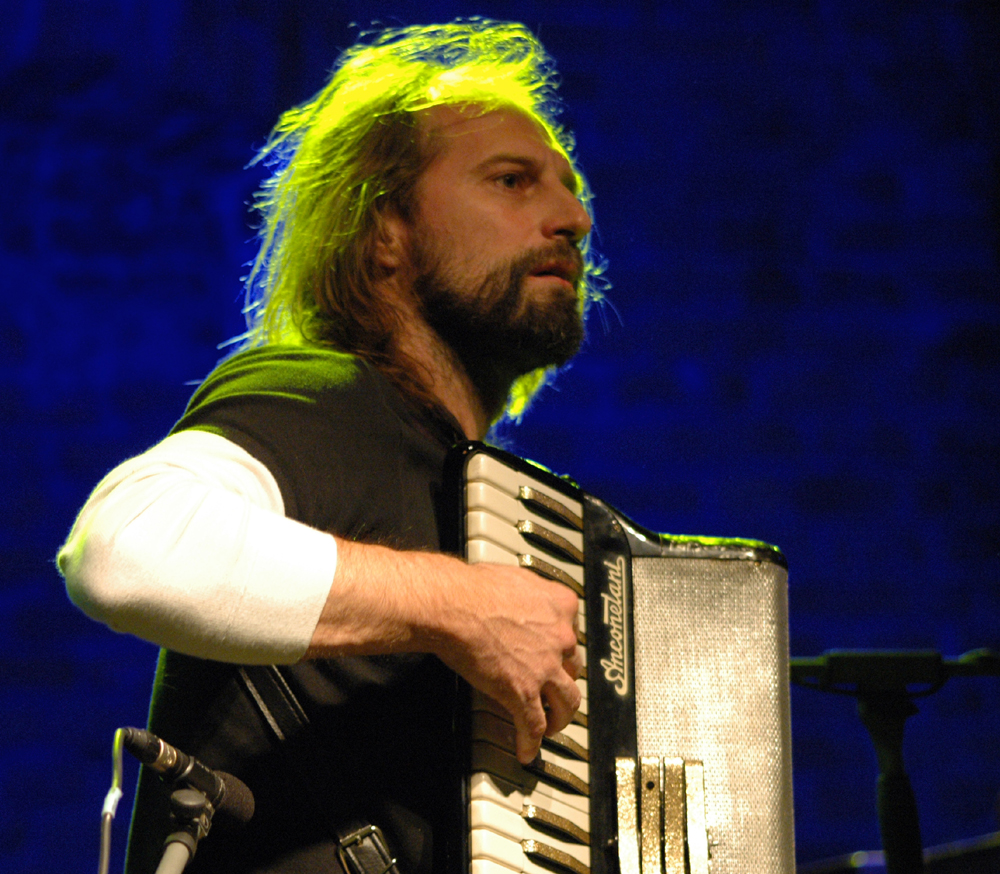
Ukrainian Argentine musician Chango Spasiuk performing in Warsaw, Poland in March 2009.

- Héctor Babenco (film director)
- Gustavo Blanco Leschuk (football player)
- José Chatruc (football player)
- Adabel Guerrero (dancer, actress)
- Olga Gurski (artist)
- Mariano Konyk (football player)
- Boris Kriukow (artist)
- Denis Margalik (figure skater)
- Nadia Podoroska (tennis player)
- Noel Schajris (singer-songwriter and pianist)
- Horacio Spasiuk (musician)
- Vladimiro Tarnawski (footballer)
- Franco Colapinto (formula 1 driver)
- Claudia Bernazza (politician)

== See also ==
- Argentina–Ukraine relations
- Eparchy of Santa María del Patrocinio en Buenos Aires
- Ukrainian diaspora
- Argentines of European descent
- Belarusian Argentines
- Hungarian Argentines
- Polish Argentines
- Romanian Argentines
- Russian Argentines
