= Ukrainian Brazilians =

Brazilian citizens of Ukrainian descent

Ukrainian Brazilians Ucraino-brasileiros Українські бразильці
- (Brazil) (Ukraine)
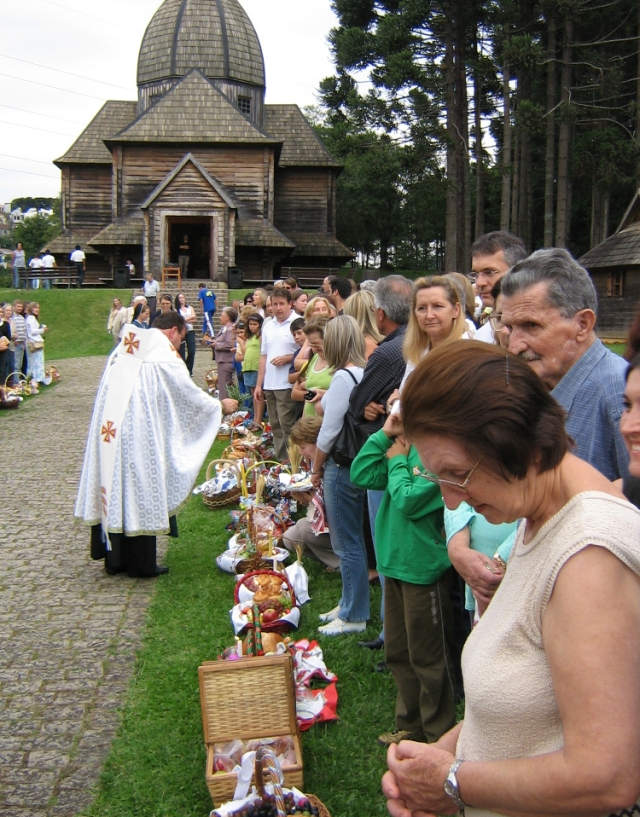
- Ukrainian Brazilians in Curitiba

Total population
- c. 600,000; 0.3% of Brazil's population (2020)

Regions with significant populations
- Brazil: Mainly Paraná and in minor degree Mato Grosso do Sul and São Paulo. Brazilian diaspora in Argentina: Misiones; Paraguay: Itapúa; and Canada: Toronto and Montreal.

Languages
- Predominantly Ukrainian in the countryside, Portuguese in urban areas and Russian (historically)

Religion
- 85% Ukrainian Greek Catholic Church · minority Eastern Orthodox Church, Baptists and Judaism · other Christians

Related ethnic groups
- White Brazilians · Polish Brazilians · Lithuanian Brazilians

Ukrainian Brazilians (Portuguese: Ucraino-brasileiro, Ucraniano-brasileiro; Ukrainian: Українські бразильці, Ukrayinski brazyltsi) are Brazilian citizens born in Ukraine, or Brazilians of Ukrainian descent who remain connected, in some degree, to Ukrainian culture.

In 1994, 400,000 people of Ukrainian descent lived in Brazil, 80% (or approximately 350,000) of whom lived in a compact region approximately 5,000 square kilometres (1,930 sq mi) in size (an area slightly smaller than Trinidad and Tobago), in the hilly south central part of the state of Paraná in southern Brazil. They refer to this region as "Brazilian Ukraine." Smaller numbers of Ukrainians have settled in São Paulo, Santa Catarina, Rio Grande do Sul, Pernambuco, and Paraíba.

The cities with the largest number of Ukrainians are Prudentópolis (approximately 38,000 Ukrainians, or 75% of the city's population), Curitiba (33,000 Ukrainians), and União da Vitória (approximately 26,400 Ukrainians or 50% of the city's population). In 2021, the population of Ukrainian descent in Brazil is estimated to be at 600,000. Ukrainian-Brazilians also settled in neighboring regions of Argentina and Paraguay, notably Misiones in Argentina and Itapúa in Paraguay both regions already had a significant Ukrainian and Polish ancestral composition. There is also a significant community of Ukrainian and Polish Brazilians in North America, concentrated in Toronto and Montreal. Around 5% of Canadians of Ukrainian and Polish ancestry have origins in Latin America.

Brazil has the third largest Ukrainian community in the Americas, and the third largest Ukrainian population outside of the former Soviet Union; only Canada and the United States have larger Ukrainian populations. In comparison to Ukrainians in North America, the Ukrainian community in Brazil (as well as in neighboring Argentina) tends to be more descended from earlier waves of immigration, is poorer, more rural, has less organizational strength, and is more focused on the Church as the center of cultural identity.

Seventy percent of Brazil's Ukrainians live in agricultural communities known as "colonies" where they tend crops such as wheat, rye, buckwheat, rice, black beans, and erva mate, a local type of tea. These colonies are isolated from modern areas of Brazil's economy and from non-Ukrainians, and in many respects closely resemble Galician (Western Ukrainian) villages of the 19th century.

== History ==
Location of the State of Paraná in Brazil, where the largest community of Ukrainians is concentrated.

=== Background ===
Most Ukrainians in Brazil have roots in the Ukrainian region of eastern Galicia. In the 19th century Galicia was an impoverished, economically underdeveloped agrarian region of the Austro-Hungarian Empire. Most ethnic Ukrainians were peasants occupying small plots of land.

As the population increased, the peasant families had less land to support themselves; by 1890 a peasant farm averaged only 6 acres (2.4 ha) in size. This situation created tremendous incentive to emigrate.

The Ukrainians of Galicia belonged to the Ukrainian Greek Catholic Church. The married priests, who had formal higher education (studying in seminaries in Vienna and Lviv), formed the Ukrainian community's educated social elite and dominated Ukrainian Galician social, political and cultural life.

The aristocracy in Galicia were largely ethnically Polish, and in the course of struggling against them the ethnic Ukrainian priests and peasants developed a very strong sense of Ukrainian patriotism and tendency to resist assimilation.

=== Ukrainian Immigration prior to 1914: the First Wave ===
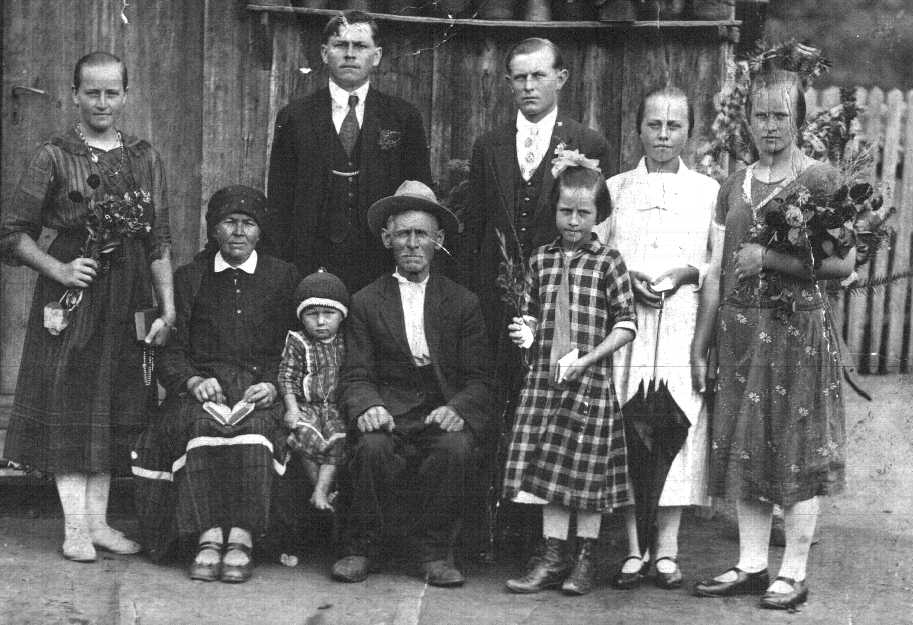
Ukrainian immigrants to Brazil in the late 19th century.

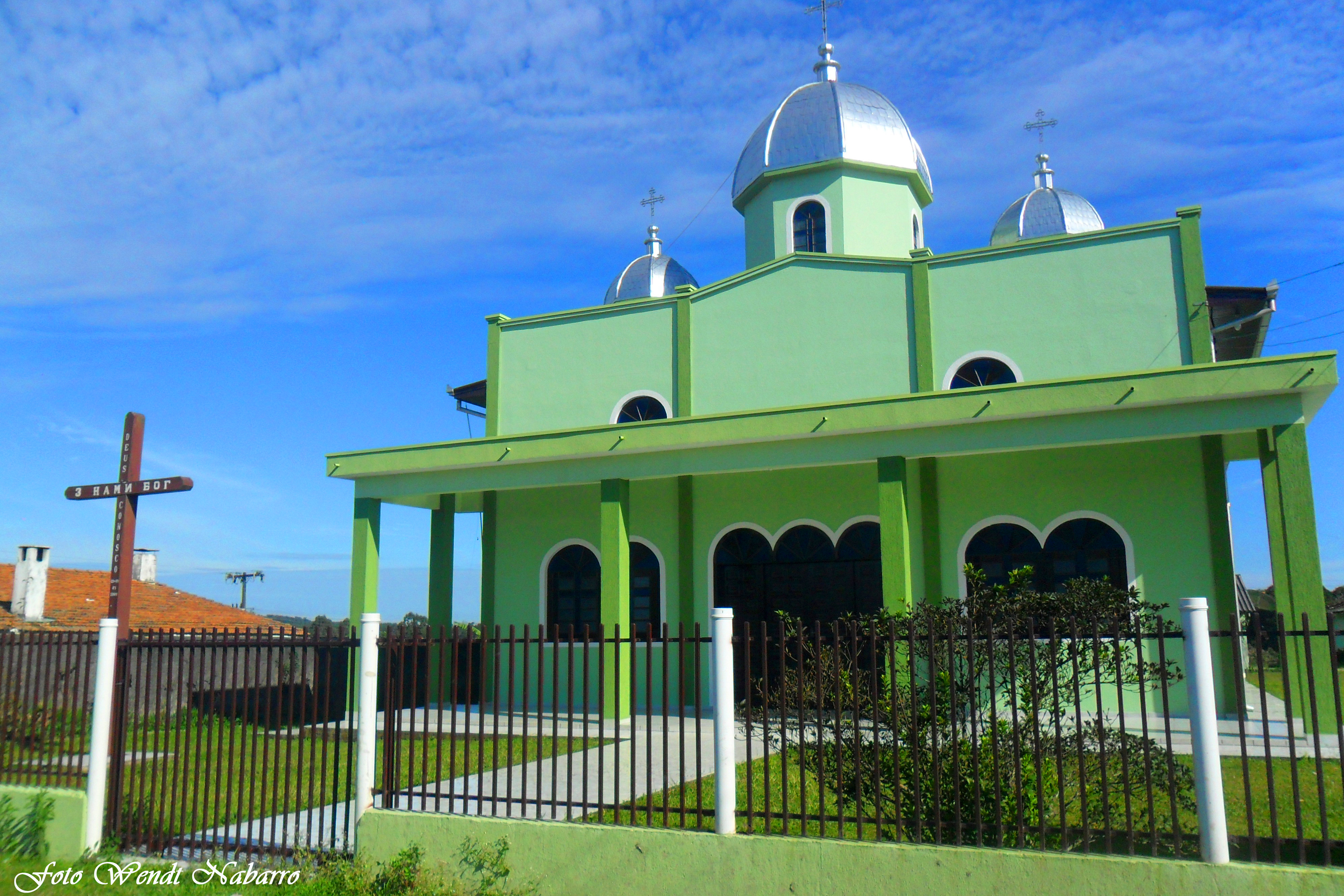
Ukrainian church in Itaiópolis.

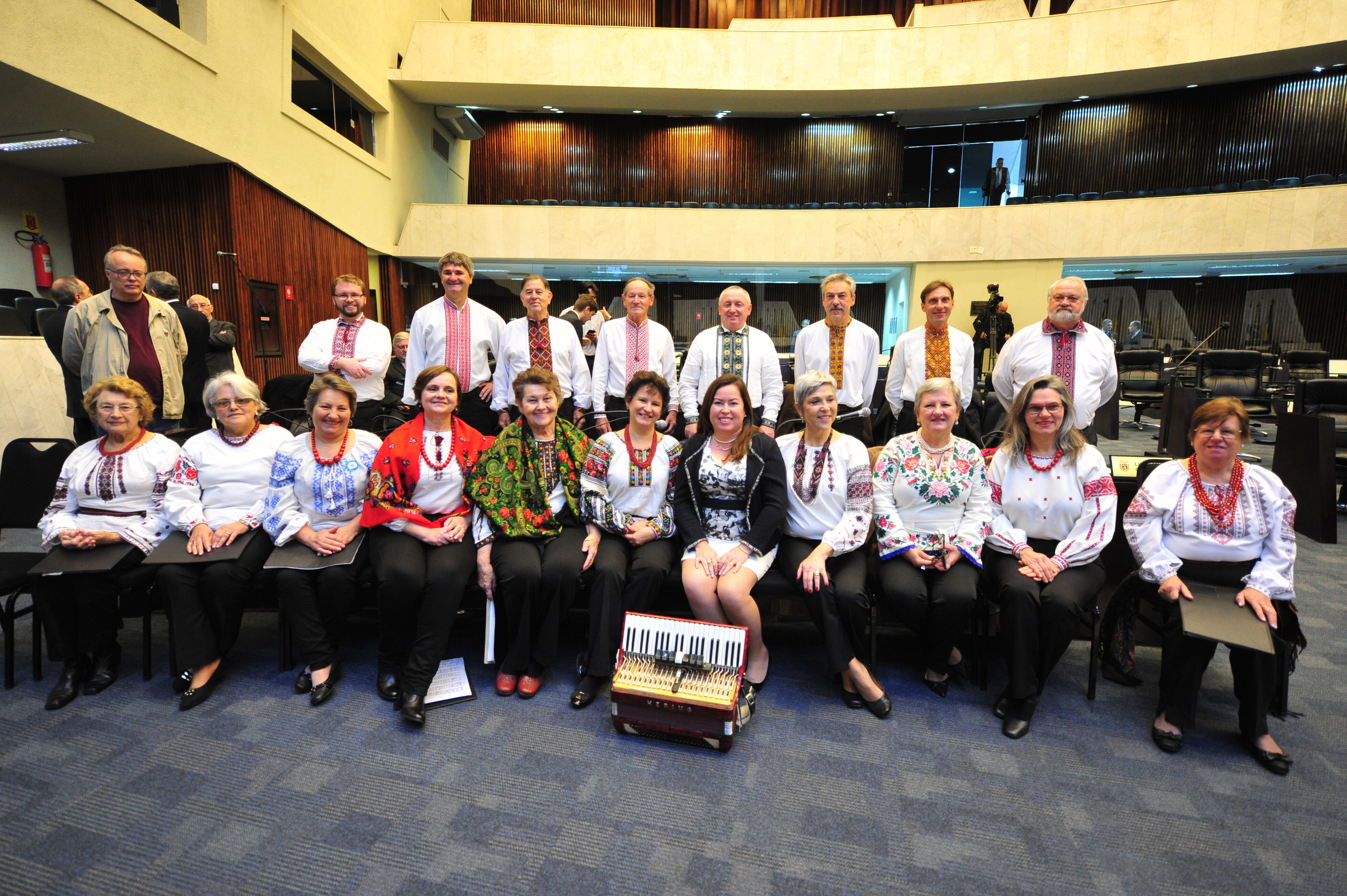
Celebration of Ukrainian immigration to Brazil at the Legislative Assembly in Curitiba.

The majority of Ukrainians in Brazil are descended from immigrants who arrived in the country prior to World War I. Although the first settler from Ukraine arrived in 1872, large waves of settlers from Austro-Hungarian controlled Galicia began coming to Brazil in 1895, mostly arriving through the port city of Paranaguá.

During a period of time known as the "Brazilian fever", between 1895 and 1897 more than 20,000 small farmers and landless peasants from Galicia, a region now in western Ukraine, came to Brazil after having been lured by promises of cheap land with good black soil. Some Ukrainian peasants were also encouraged by rumors that Rudolf, Crown Prince of Austria, had not died but had moved to Brazil and that he would welcome Ukrainian immigrants to that country (Ukrainians were traditionally loyal to the Austrian monarchy).

The Brazilian government was interested in increasing European settlement, often paid for travel (thus enabling the poorest members of society to emigrate), and even promised to provide clothing and food to the settlers. Soon after arriving, however, the settlers found that the promises were not kept. They were given plots of uncleared land far away from civilization and weren't given any assistance. The settlers were unfamiliar with the strange climate and how to cultivate it, succumbed to diseases without any medical help, and experienced many deaths. Their suffering became known in Ukraine and even became the subject of a series of poems, "To Brazil", by the well-known Ukrainian poet Ivan Franko.

After news of their misfortune spread throughout western Ukraine, the flow of Ukrainian emigrants to Brazil decreased considerably, and Canada replaced Brazil as the main destination for Ukrainians leaving for the New World. Until 1907, only several hundred to one thousand Ukrainians came to Brazil from western Ukraine every year. From that year until 1914, approximately 15,000 to 20,000 Ukrainians were brought to Brazil by the Brazilian government in order to help build a railroad from the State of São Paulo to Rio Grande do Sul through Paraná.

=== The second and third waves of Ukrainian immigration ===
Between the two world wars, approximately 9,000 more Ukrainians immigrated to Brazil. This group was more diverse, coming not only from the Galicia region in Ukraine but also from Volhynia, Polesia, as well as in smaller numbers from Transcarpathia, Bukovina and from Ukrainian settlements in Yugoslavia. Among its members were some with a higher level of education and greater level of political activity.

In 1922, under the initiative of a representative of the West Ukrainian National Republic, the "Ukrainian Union of Brazil" was formed. It took a leadership role in the Ukrainian community's political, economic and cultural-educational life. At this time, Ukrainian cooperatives made their appearance in Brazil.

The last group of Ukrainians came to Brazil between 1947 and 1951. These were mostly seeking asylum from Soviet persecution having played an active part in Ukraine's independence movement. This group, numbering approximately 7,000 was for the most part more educated and highly skilled compared to previous immigrants, and included many intellectuals.

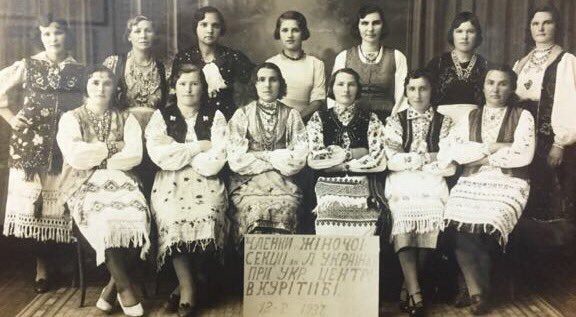
Ukrainian women section in Curitiba

Many of them later emigrated to other countries, especially the United States and Canada, in pursuit of better economic opportunities. The new arrivals helped create the Brazilian chapter of the Ukrainian scouting organization Plast which continues to function in Brazil today.

In 2022, Brazilian president Jair Bolsonaro said the country will allow Ukrainians to move to Brazil through a humanitarian visa, stating "the country will do whatever is possible to receive Ukrainians in Brazil".

== Ukrainian Brazilian society ==
=== Religion ===
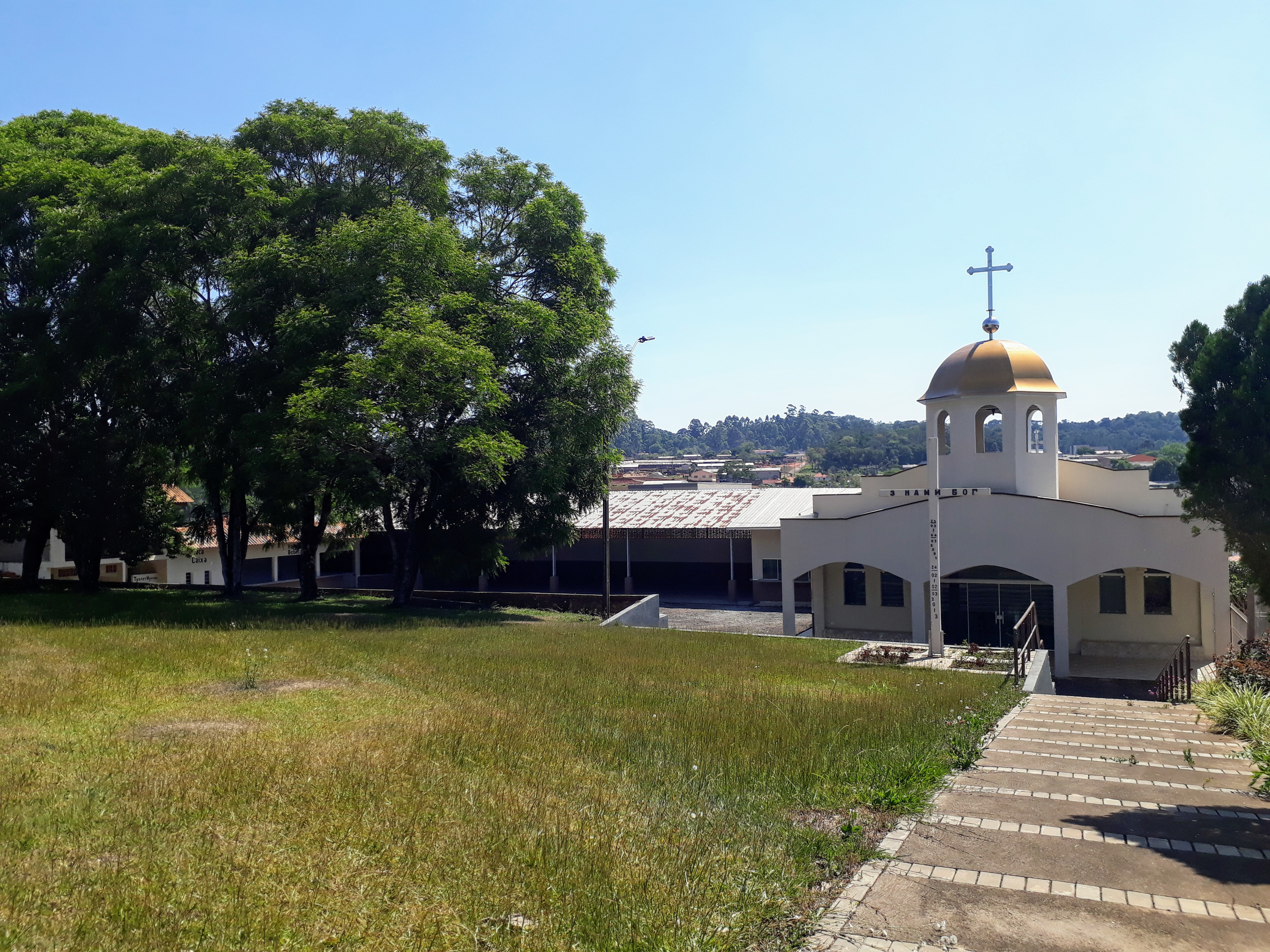
Ukrainian church in Ortigueira.

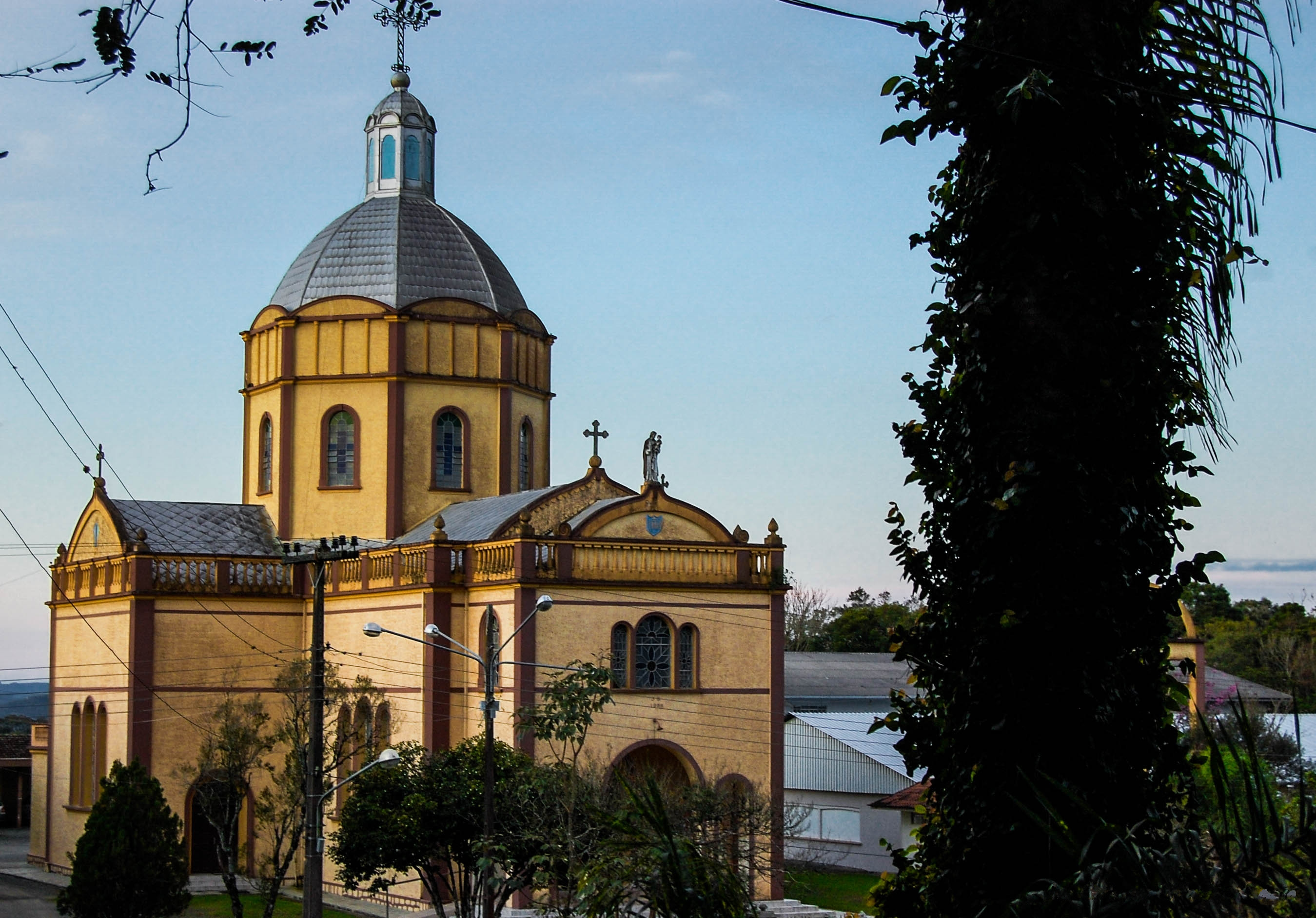
Ukrainian church in Itaiópolis.

The Ukrainian Greek Catholic Church has a strong hold on Ukrainian society in Brazil, where it is wealthy and has massive landholdings including 230 churches and five monasteries run by the Order of Saint Basil the Great. Approximately 85% of Brazil's Ukrainians belong to this Church. Lavish onion-domed churches proliferate throughout the villages in the Ukrainian part of Brazil, despite the modest economic means of the farmers. The Church has been accused of blocking measures to improve the plight of the rural population, for fear that modernization will lessen the population's dependence on it. In some respects rural Brazilian-Ukrainian society resembles that of Galicia in the 19th century, where the influence of the Church and its priests was so great that it has been referred to as theocratic. In Prudentópolis, the regional center in Parana whose population is 75% Ukrainian, the Ukrainian Catholic Cathedral of São Josafat overlooks the city center. There is also a seminary, and Ukrainian printing press run by the Church and a Ukrainian cultural museum.

It should be also noticed that some Ukrainians were also Protestant, belonging to the Baptist and Pentecostals branch of Christianity. Originally coming from Volyn Region, they brought their Ukrainian traditions of worshipping God. The biggest church was the Russian Assembly of God (90% were Ukrainians and the rest Russians, Poles, Belarusians and few Lithuanians) based in São Paulo. It was founded around 1930 and led by Pr. Szymon Misiuk with branches in Arapongas -PR, Apucarana - PR, Curitiba - PR, Erechin and Santa Rosa - RS. São Caetano do Sul, in São Paulo State had a big concentration of Ukrainians as well and the First Ukrainian Baptist Church was established there by Rev. Dmitro Bucky. Many other churches were also based in São Paulo. The Ukrainian Protestants were not able to maintain their ethnic identity and with the oldtimers dying, the new generation did not keep the tradition of services in Ukrainian language, churches disappeared or were turned into Brazilian churches, and Slavic connections disappeared.

=== Language and culture ===
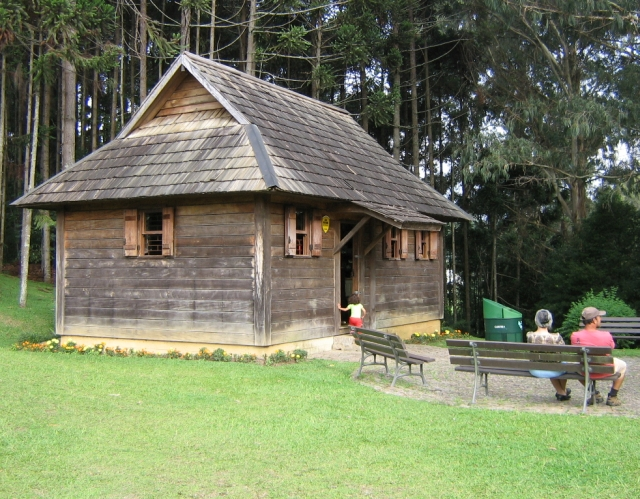
Ukrainian village architecture in Curitiba.

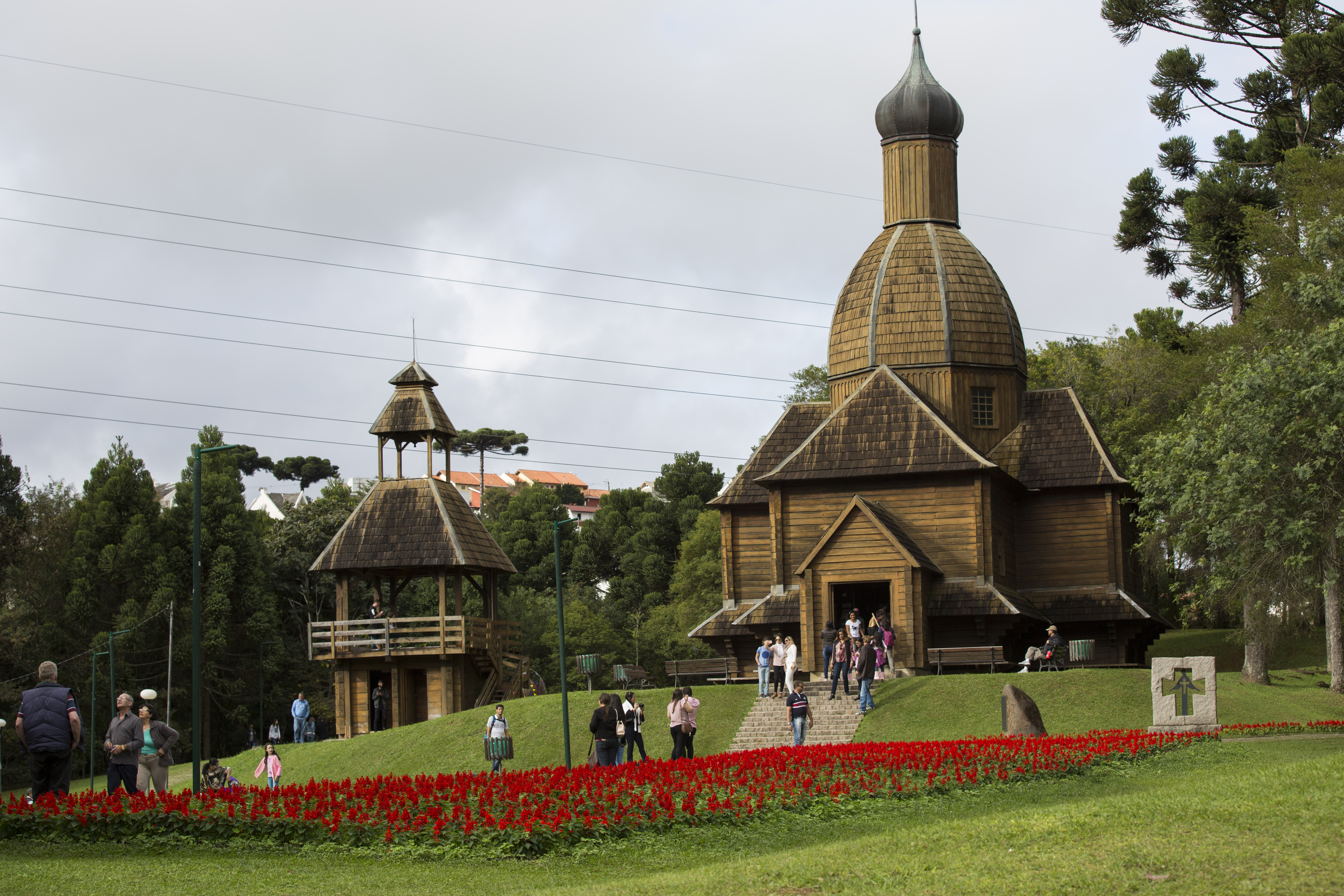
Ukrainian church in Tingüi Park, Curitiba.

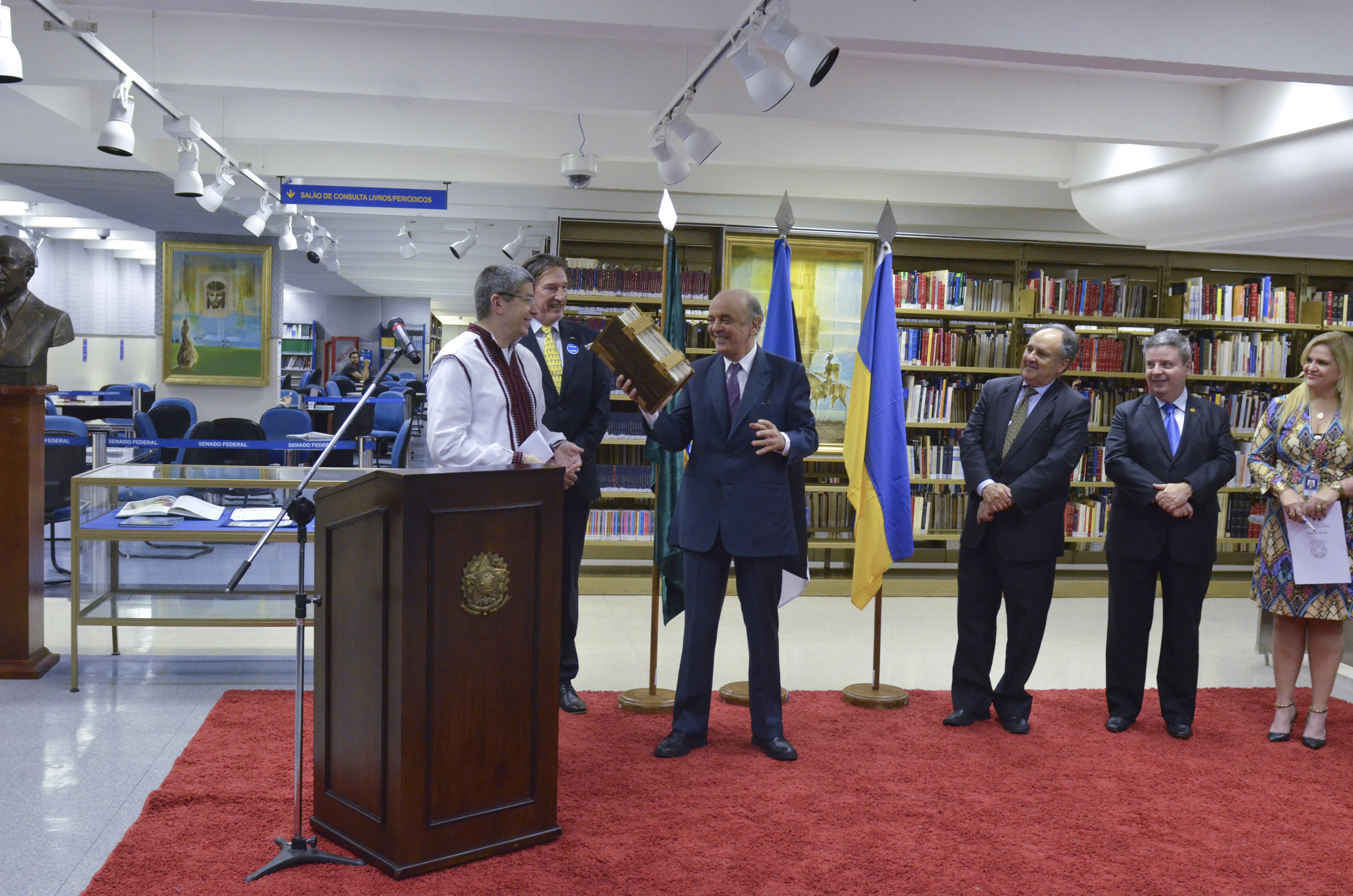
Solemnity for Ukrainians in the Senate of Brazil, in Brasília.

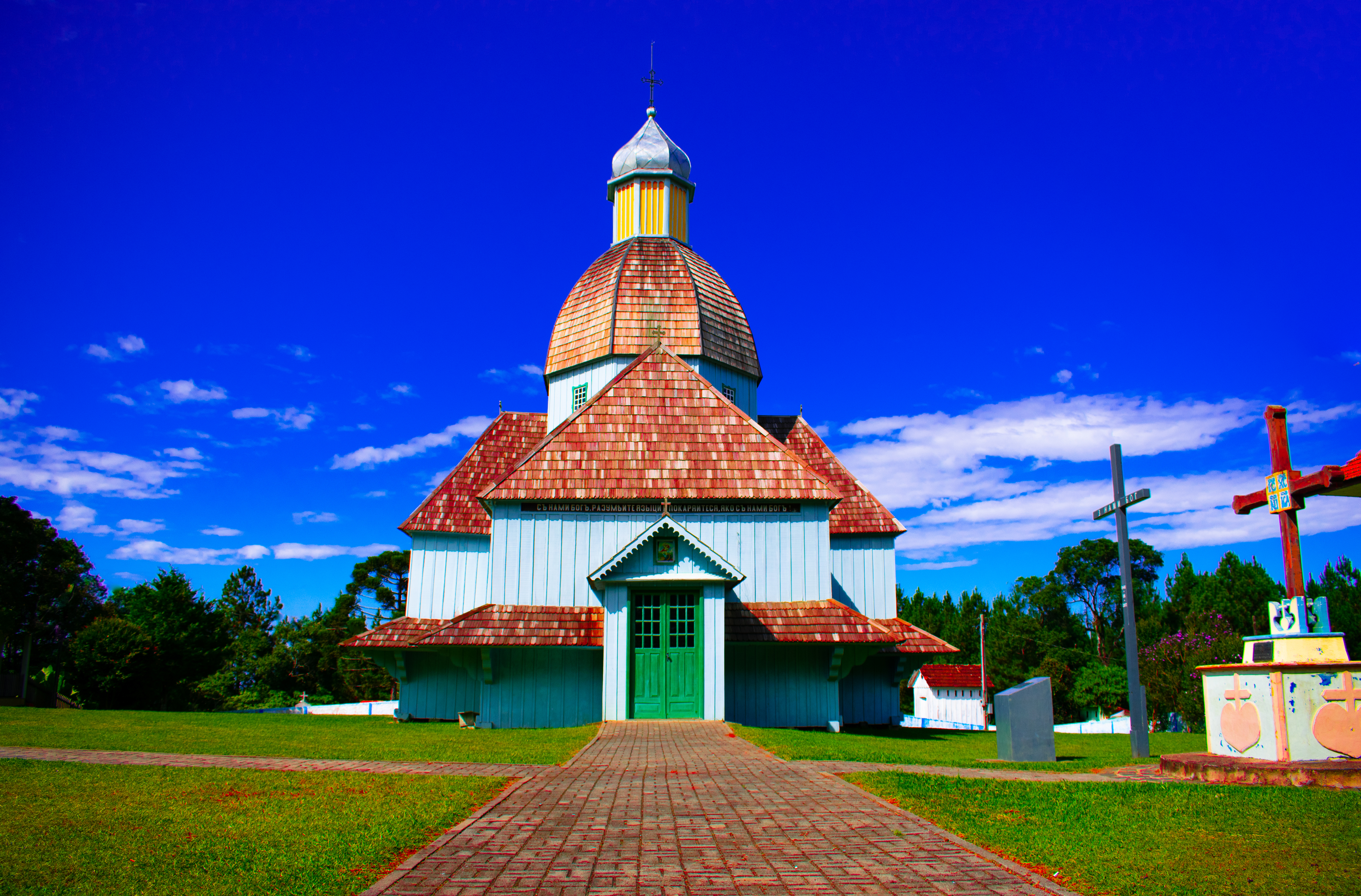
Entrance to the Ukrainian Church in Mallet.

Although most Brazilian Ukrainians have lived in Brazil for 4-5 generations and few have ever seen Ukraine, they have preserved their language and culture to a large degree in rural Paraná state. This has largely been due to the colossal efforts of the Ukrainian Churches. In contrast, among the Ukrainians in Argentina where the Church was not as strong as in Brazil, the Ukrainian language has largely disappeared.

Among those who live in the colonies, or agricultural settlements, Ukrainian is widely spoken at home, in church, and in the community, and today it is not uncommon for Ukrainian children to be unable to speak the Portuguese language until they begin school. Despite the Ukrainian language's widespread use in everyday speech, the ability to read and write is more limited, with over 50% of the Ukrainian population being unable to write in the Ukrainian language.

Due to isolation from Ukraine, the Ukrainians of Brazil speak a 100-year-old form of the language's Galician or "Upper Dniestrian" dialect. Ninety percent of Church services are conducted in the Ukrainian language (in contrast, among the 700,000 ethnic Poles in Brazil only two churches use the Polish language).

The Portuguese language has only come into wide use in the youngest generation - those who are younger than fifteen years old. Paraná boasts five Ukrainian-language radio stations, including "Zabava" which broadcasts news, Ukrainian folk and pop music, and the Divine Liturgy. In addition, Brazil has 23 Ukrainian dance troupes. In the rural areas, Ukrainians rarely marry non-Ukrainians, and mixed marriages generally adopt the Ukrainian culture.

The Ukrainians' neighbors - Caboclos, Poles, Germans, Italians, and some Dutch - at times accuse the Ukrainians and their priests of maintaining an exclusiveness that sometimes borders on racism, although non-Brazilians who visit the local Ukrainians are treated with the utmost civility. Ukrainians in Brazil commonly refer to themselves and to Ukrainians from other countries as "our people" (Nashi Liudy) and to non-Ukrainians of any nationality as "blacks" (Chorni).

The situation in urban areas is quite different. In the cities, Ukrainians tend to become assimilated into Brazilian culture and to adopt the Portuguese language.

=== Education ===
The Sister Servants of Mary Immaculate operate 30 Ukrainian elementary schools, 17 kindergartens, and two secondary schools. They also operate a boarding school in Prudentopolis, as well as teach instructions in the Ukrainian language on Saturdays. Only Ukrainian is spoken in the boarding school.

As a result of an amendment to the constitution of the state of Paraná initiated by Ukrainian-Brazilian Deputy Vira Vichymyshyn Azhibert, the Ukrainian language is now taught in state schools as well. In March 1991, it was taught in 4 state schools with 600 students; the number of public schools adopting the Ukrainian language was expected to grow. The Federal University of Paraná in Curitiba has organized a pedagogical course for Ukrainian-language instructors. Ukrainian Saturday schools operate in Curitiba.

=== Current trends ===
As a result of the humanitarian visa given to Ukrainians in 2022, immigration in Brazil, represented by the Federal Police of Brazil, registered the entry of 894 new Ukrainian immigrants through airports in Brazil, from February 24, 2022, at the beginning of the Russian invasion of Ukraine, until March 17, 2022. The humanitarian visa is automatically obtained upon arrival at the airports in Brazil, but it can also be obtained in advance, however, it is not necessary, if it is obtained in advance, it can be requested from the countries that Ukrainians are fleeing across Europe or the world. The humanitarian visa is valid for up to 180 days. After this period, Ukrainian immigrants will be entitled to temporary residency for two years and will be able to claim permanent residency. According to the previous rule, it was already allowed that Ukrainians could spend up to 90 days in Brazil without the need for a visa, now with the humanitarian visa Ukrainians can apply for residency, with the rights to live, work and study guaranteed by Brazilian law.

Religious associations from Brazil and abroad, such as the Baptist Association of Social Action, etc., in Brazil and the Global Kingdom Partnership Network, etc., abroad, are helping to displace the Ukrainian refugees that accumulate on the borders of the European countries that border Ukraine, such as Poland, Hungary, Slovakia, Romania, Moldova, etc. The camps are overcrowded as the numbers of refugees grow daily. Brazilian Pastor Paschoal Priagine, who is also president of the First Baptist Church of Curitiba in Brazil, is offering the support of up to 300 Ukrainians, with a year supporting all the needs of these Ukrainian families, such as housing and food, with the humanitarian visa Ukrainians can now work and study in Brazil. Ukrainian families with children accepted the proposal and began to disembark in Brazil. Also in Curitiba, a Brazilian capital with a strong Slavic presence, from Eastern European countries, Natália Waszczynskyi, who is Brazilian, but the daughter of Ukrainians, helps as a volunteer in the translation of the conversation with the Ukrainian newcomers, from the Ukrainian language to the Portuguese language and vice versa.

== Notable Brazilian nationals of Ukrainian ethnicity ==
- Maria Berushko – teacher, may become the first Orthodox saint in South America (of Orthodox Ukrainian descent).
- Héctor Babenco – film director, screenwriter, producer, actor (Naturalized Brazilian, born in Argentina to Ukrainian-Jewish father and Polish-Jewish mother).
- Oxana Narozniak – sculptor (born in Germany of Ukrainian descent, living in Curitiba).
- Vira Vovk – poet (born in Ukraine and emigrated to Brazil after World War II).
- Rafael Sóbis – football striker.
- Dmytro Zajciw – entomologist, discoverer of many beetle species.
- Clarice Lispector – Jewish writer born in Ukraine whose family immigrated to Brazil before she was two. Became widely known as an influential writer in the Portuguese Language.

== Notable Brazilians with Ukrainian born ancestors ==
- Eliana Michaelichen Bezerra – television hostess, Ukrainian descent on maternal side.
- Luciano Huck – television host, grandson of a Ukrainian.

== See also ==
- Brazil–Ukraine relations
- Ukrainian diaspora
- Immigration to Brazil
