= Argentine Americans =

Americans of Argentine birth or descent

Argentino-estadounidenses (Spanish)

Total population
- 286,346 (2018); 0.09% of the U.S. population (2018)

Regions with significant populations
- Florida, Kentucky, North Carolina, Virginia, Maryland, Delaware, Texas, California, Illinois, Wisconsin, New York, New Jersey, Minnesota, Connecticut, Pennsylvania, Massachusetts, Utah, Washington, Oregon and Colorado

Languages
- English · Spanish · Italian · Spanglish

Religion
- Predominantly Roman Catholic Church; Other Religions

Related ethnic groups
- Americans in Argentina, Afro-Argentines, White Argentines, Native Argentines, Uruguayan Americans, Italian Americans, Spanish Americans, Arab Americans, Chinese Americans, Indian Americans, Korean Americans, Japanese Americans, Laotian Americans

Argentine Americans (Spanish: argentino-estadounidenses) are Americans who have full or partial Argentinian ancestry. Argentine immigration increased after the 1976 Argentine coup d'état and the 2001 Argentine Great Depression, and many took up residence in states such as California, Florida, and New York.

== History ==
The first Argentines who arrived in the United States in large numbers did so during the 1950s and 1960s, seeking better economic conditions. A wave of Argentine immigrants came to Las Vegas, Nevada in the 1950s. Most of these arrivals had achieved higher education in Argentina. For example, many were scientists. However, immigrants in the late 1970s arrived fleeing the political state sponsored terrorism of the dictatorship. They numbered 44,803 people. Then, a few decades later, large waves of immigrants left the country after its economic crash in 2001 and economic decline in 2014. As a result, according to "Latinx Immigrants" from the International and Cultural Psychology book series, as of 2018 there were over a million Argentines living abroad. Approximately 60% of Argentines now living in the United States arrived after 1990. This influx in immigrants was especially dramatic between the years 2000 and 2005, with many hoping to escape financial loss in their home country.

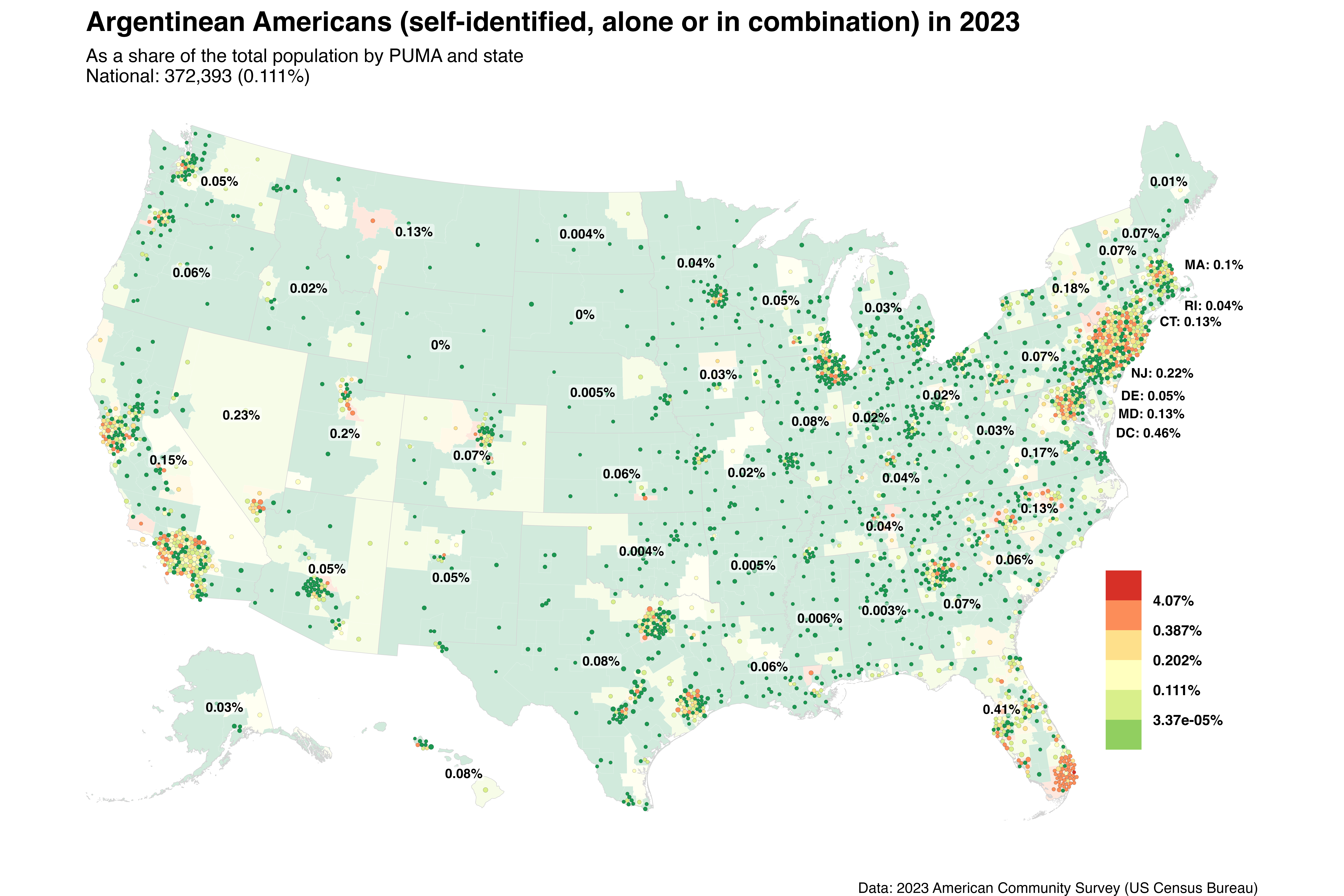
Argentinean Americans

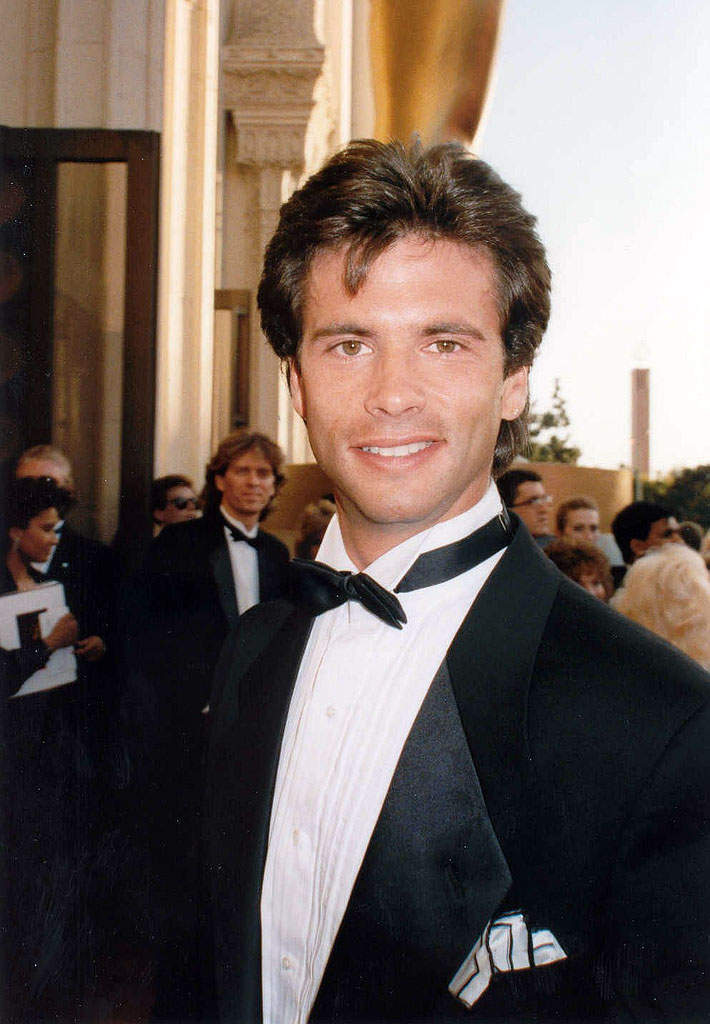
Lorenzo Lamas is an actor of Argentine descent, son of Fernando Lamas.

This new immigrant group had an educational level lower than earlier immigrants. The majority of Argentine immigrants headed to metropolitan areas, especially New York City, where 20 percent of them lived in the 1970s. In the 1980s, that percentage increased to just over 23 percent, and the 1990 U.S. Census recorded that New York City had 17,363 Argentine Americans and Los Angeles, 15,115. Immigration to New York City was popular because of the existing Argentine and Italian communities, as many Argentines are of Italian origin. With the goal of helping its Argentine population, the government of the city created several organizations such as the Argentine-American Chamber of Commerce, which that established relations between Argentina and the United States. The 1990 U.S. Census recorded 92,563 Argentines, evidencing that nearly half of the Argentine immigrants arrived in the last two decades alone.

After the 1990s, Southern California and Florida became leading destinations for new immigrants from Argentina. According to the 2010 Census, out of the over 200,000 Argentine Americans recorded, it is estimated that Los Angeles and Miami have over 50,000 Argentine Americans each, followed by the New York area. According to data from the Pew Research Center, in 2017 about 29% of Argentine Americans resided in Florida. Meanwhile, 18% lived in California and 10% in New York.

== Socioeconomics ==
The profile of the Argentine American population is generally similar to the overall U.S. population. Among the key differences, however, is educational attainment. Argentine Americans exhibit a rate of 39.5% of holders of bachelor's, graduate, or professional degrees, contrasted with 27.5% of the overall U.S. population. The difference is more marked among women: 40.2% for Argentine American females, and 26.7% for all U.S. females. Another major difference is that 69.1% of Argentine Americans are immigrants, which contrasts sharply with 12.6% of the overall U.S. population.

== Demographics ==
=== States ===
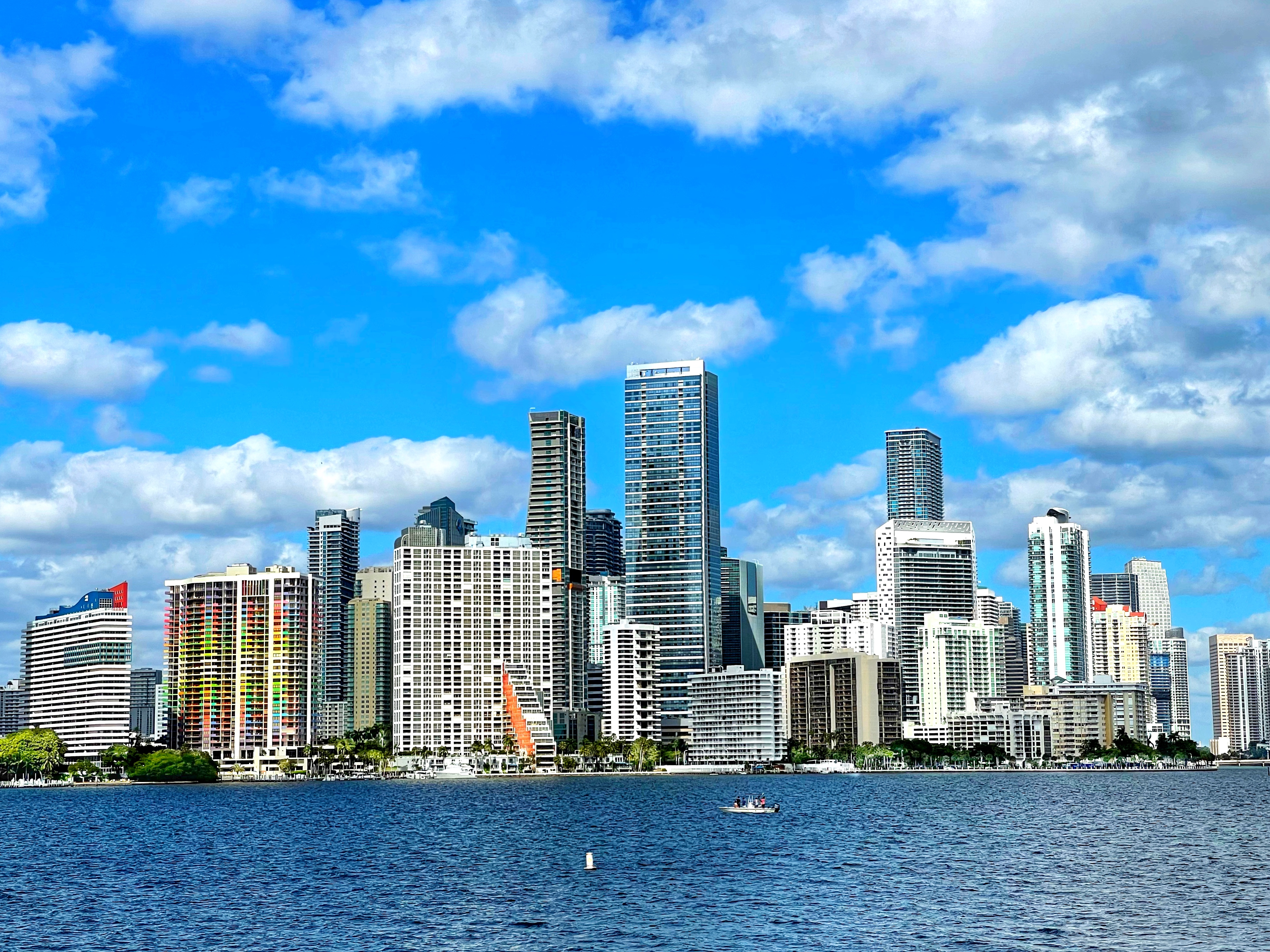
Greater Miami is home to the highest concentration of Argentines in the US, with significant populations in North Beach, Doral, and Weston.

The 10 states with the largest population of Argentines (Source: 2010 Census):

1. Florida - 57,260 (0.3% of state population)
2. California - 44,410 (0.1% of state population)
3. New York - 24,969 (0.1% of state population)
4. New Jersey - 14,272 (0.2% of state population)
5. Texas - 13,831 (0.1% of state population)
6. Virginia - 6,263 (0.1% of state population)
7. Illinois - 5,294 (less than 0.1% of state population)
8. Maryland - 5,138 (0.1% of state population)
9. Utah - 4,639 (0.2% of state population)
10. Pennsylvania - 4,273 (less than 0.1% of state population)

=== Cities ===
The 10 cities with the largest population of Argentines (Source: 2010 Census):

1. New York, NY - 15,169 (0.2%)
2. Los Angeles - 8,570 (0.2%)
3. Miami, FL - 4,891 (1.2%)
4. Miami Beach, FL - 4,030 (4.6%)
5. Houston, TX - 2,440 (0.1%)
6. Chicago, IL - 1,743 (0.1%)
7. Hollywood, FL - 1,626 (1.2%)
8. Aventura, FL - 1,579 (4.4%)
9. San Diego, CA - 1,322 (0.1%)
10. Pembroke Pines, FL - 1,147 (0.7%)

=== Ethnic background ===
The ancestry of the majority of the population of Argentina is primarily of Italian and Spanish ancestry (see demographics of Argentina) with significant French, German, British, Slavic, and Semitic (Jewish and Arab) components. Minority have Mestizo, Amerindian ancestors (primarily Mapuche, Qulla, Wichí, and Toba), Chinese ancestors, Indian/Indo-Caribbean ancestors, and other European and Asian ancestors.

=== Large communities ===
Only data for immigrant Argentine Americans are available. The twenty U.S. communities of 500 or more people which have the highest percentages of Argentine immigrants are:

1. Miami Beach, FL 4.4%
2. Sunny Isles Beach, FL 4.1%
3. Plantation Mobile Home Park, FL 4.0%
4. Bay Harbor Islands, FL 3.5%
5. North Bay Village, FL and Key Biscayne, FL 3.4%
6. Deer Park, CA 3.3%
7. Harbor Hills, NY 3.0%
8. Surfside, FL 2.6%
9. Lauderdale-by-the-Sea, FL 2.4%
10. Acton, CA 2.3%
11. Aventura, FL 2.1%
12. Islandia, NY and The Crossings, FL 2.0%
13. Thomaston, NY and Ojus, FL 1.9%
14. Doral, FL 1.8%
15. East Richmond Heights, CA 1.7%
16. Lebanon, IL 1.6%
17. Mayland-Pleasant Hill, TN 1.5%
18. Sunnyslope, CA, Herricks, NY, and La Habra Heights, CA 1.4%
19. Lawrenceville, NJ and Cutler, FL 1.3%
20. Gardiner, NY, Miami Shores, FL, Flower Hill, NY, and Groton Long Point, CT 1.2%

== Notable people ==
Argentine Americans have been notable in contemporary American lifestyle in cultural and intellectual aspects. Among the outstanding people are actresses Alexis Bledel, Julie Gonzalo, Olivia Hussey and Anya Taylor-Joy, actor Lorenzo Lamas. Journalist Andrés Oppenheimer. Sportscaster Andrés Cantor. Musicians Lalo Schifrin, Kevin Johansen and alternative pop duo Magdalena Bay. Businessmen Jim Farley, Jorge M. Pérez. Writer Fabian Nicieza. Athletes Benjamin Cremaschi, Marcelo Balboa, Diana Taurasi, Martin Gramatica, Pablo Mastroeni and Claudio Reyna. Another notable person is writer and activist Cecilia Gentili.

== See also ==
- Argentine Australians
- Demographics of Argentina
- White Argentines
- Argentina–United States relations
