= Disability in Argentina =

In 2018, it was reported that 10.2% of the population live with some form of disability in Argentina. Additionally, an estimated 28.7% of households include at least one member with a disability.

== History of disability legislation ==
Argentine legislation related to disability has evolved significantly over time, demonstrating an increased commitment to the rights and welfare of individuals with disabilities. On 16 March 1981, Law 22.431 was enacted in Argentina. This law provides various benefits to people with disabilities, including opportunities for job and professional training, access to loans and subsidies, support in education, and a range of state benefits.

Subsequently, in 1997, Law 24.901 was passed and enacted, which laid the groundwork for a comprehensive system of welfare and care for individuals with disabilities. In 2001, Law 25.504 was passed and enacted. This legislation permits the Ministry of Health to issue certificates of disability.

== See also ==
- Demographics of Argentina
