= Demographics of Argentina =

Argentinian demography

- Population pyramid of Argentina as of June 2026
- Population: 47,070,217 (2026)
- Density: 16.92930/km^{2}
- Growth rate: ▼0.23% (2023 est.)
- Birth rate: ▼8.9 births/1,000 population (2024)
- Death rate: ▼8.1 deaths/1,000 population (2024)
- Life expectancy: ▲78.8 years
  - male: ▲75.8 years
  - female: ▲82.0 years (2024 est.)
- Fertility rate: ▼1.04 children born/woman (2025)
- Infant mortality: ▼8.0 deaths/1,000 live births (2023)
- Net migration rate: ▲ −0.08 migrant(s)/1,000 population (2023 est.)
- Immigrant share: 4.3% (2024)

Age structure
- 0–14 years: ▼19.20% (male 4,812,709/female 4,636,022)
- 15–64 years: ▲68.31% (male 15,923,617/female 15,914,994)
- 65 and over: ▲12.49% (male 2,441,497/female 3,279,977) (2025)

Sex ratio
- Total: 0.98 male(s)/female (2023 est.)
- At birth: 1.07 male(s)/female
- Under 15: 1.06 male(s)/female
- 15–64 years: 1.01 male(s)/female
- 65 and over: 0.74 male(s)/female

Nationality
- Nationality: Argentine
- Major ethnic: White (N/D); European (N/D); Italian (N/D); Spanish (N/D); French (N/D); Basque (N/D); German (N/D); Other (N/D); Levantine; Lebanese (N/D); Syrian (N/D); Other (N/D); Armenian (N/D); Afrikaner (N/D); Turkish (N/D); Other (N/D)
- Minor ethnic: Mestizo (N/D); Native (2.83%); Mapuche (0.32%); Guaraní (0.29%); Diaguita (0.19%); Toba (0.17%); Qulla (0.15%); Other (1.71%); East Asian (N/D); Chinese (N/D); Japanese (N/D); Korean (N/D); Other (N/D); Black (0.66%); Angolan (N/D); Cape Verdean (N/D); Senegalese (N/D); Other (N/D); Indian (N/D)

Language
- Official: Spanish (96.8%)
- Spoken: Italian (1.7%); Others (1.5%)

This is a demography of Argentina including population density, ethnicity, economic status, age and other aspects of the population.

As of the 2022 census [INDEC], Argentina had a population of 46,044,703 – a 15.3% increase from the 40,117,096 counted in the 2010 census [INDEC].

Argentina ranks third in South America in total population and 33rd globally. The country's population density is of 16.9 people per square kilometer of land area – well below the world average of 62 people. Argentina's population growth rate in 2023 was estimated to be 0.23% annually, with a birth rate of 9.9 per 1,000 inhabitants and a mortality rate of 7.6 per 1,000 inhabitants.

The proportion of people under 15, at 20%, is well below the world average (25%), and the cohort of people 65 and older is relatively high, at 12%. The percentage of senior citizens in Argentina has long been second only to Uruguay in Latin America and well above the world average, which is currently 9.8%.

The median age is approximately 34 years, and life expectancy at birth is of 78 years. According to an official cultural consumption survey conducted in 2006, 42.3% of Argentines speak English (though only 15.4% of those claimed to have a high level of English comprehension), 9.3% speak Portuguese and 5.9% speak Italian.

== Population size and structure ==
Historical population
Year	Pop.	±% p.a.
1650	298,000	—
1778	420,900	+0.27%
1800	551,500	+1.24%
1809	609,200	+1.11%
1825	766,400	+1.45%
1839	926,300	+1.36%
1857	1,299,600	+1.90%
1869	1,830,214	+2.89%
1895	4,044,911	+3.10%
1914	7,903,662	+3.59%
1947	15,893,811	+2.14%
1960	20,013,793	+1.79%
1970	23,364,431	+1.56%
1980	27,949,480	+1.81%
1991	32,615,528	+1.41%
2001	36,260,130	+1.06%
2010	40,117,096	+1.13%
2022	46,044,703	+1.16%

Sources: Pantelides and National Institute of Statistics and Census of Argentina

Years	Total fertility rates (children/woman)	Crude birth rates	Age 0–14	Age 15–29	Age 30–44	Age 45–59	Age 60–74	Age 75+
1869	6.8	49.1	45.3%	29.7%	16.0%	7.0%	1.8%	0.2%
1895	7.0	44.5	40.3%	27.7%	19.5%	8.9%	2.9%	0.7%
1914	5.2	36.5	38.4%	30.8%	17.9%	8.9%	3.3%	0.7%
1947	3.2	24.7	30.8%	27.5%	21.5%	13.6%	5.5%	1.1%
1960	3.1	22.9	30.8%	23.8%	21.2%	15.3%	7.3%	1.6%
1970	3.1	22.7	29.3%	24.6%	19.9%	15.4%	8.6%	2.2%
1980	3.4	24.8	30.4%	23.9%	18.8%	15.1%	9.0%	2.8%
1991	2.9	21.1	30.6%	23.3%	19.3%	13.9%	9.6%	3.3%
2001	2.6	18.4	28.3%	25.0%	18.6%	14.7%	9.3%	4.1%
2010	2.4	18.5	25.5%	24.8%	20.2%	15.2%	9.8%	4.5%
2022	1.4	10.7	22.0%	23.3%	22.1%	16.4%	11.2%	5.0%

=== Cities ===
By 2022 census, the % of the population living in:
1. Buenos Aires (35.8%)
2. Córdoba (4.06%)
3. Rosario (3.34%)
4. Mendoza (2.72%)
5. Tucumán (2.35%)
6. Rest of Argentina (51.7%)

Argentina is highly urbanized, with the ten largest metropolitan areas accounting for half of the population, and fewer than one in ten living in rural areas. About 3 million people live in Buenos Aires proper, and including suburban Greater Buenos Aires the metropolitan area totals around 14 million – making it one of the 15 largest urban areas in the world. The metropolitan areas of Córdoba and Rosario have around 1.3 million inhabitants each, and six other cities (Mendoza, Tucumán, La Plata, Mar del Plata, Salta and Santa Fe) have at least half a million people each.

The population is unequally distributed amongst the provinces, with 61% living in the Pampa region (21% of the total area), including 17.5 million people in Buenos Aires Province, 4 million in Córdoba Province, and over 3 million each in Santa Fe Province and the Autonomous City of Buenos Aires. Eight other provinces each have over one million people: Mendoza, Tucumán, Salta, Entre Ríos, Misiones, Corrientes, Chaco, and Santiago del Estero. Tucumán is the most densely populated (with 75 inhabitants/km^{2}, the only Argentine province more densely populated than the world average), while the southern province of Santa Cruz has just 1.4 inhabitant/km^{2}.

In the mid-19th century, a large wave of immigration started to arrive to Argentina due to new constitutional policies that encouraged immigration, and issues in the countries the immigrants came from such as wars, poverty, hunger, famines, pursuit of a better life, among other reasons. The main immigration sources were from Europe, the countries from the Near and Middle East, Russia and Japan. In fact, the immigration torrent was so strong that Argentina eventually received the second-largest number of immigrants in the world, second only to the US and ahead of such immigrant receptor countries such as Canada, Brazil, Australia, etc.

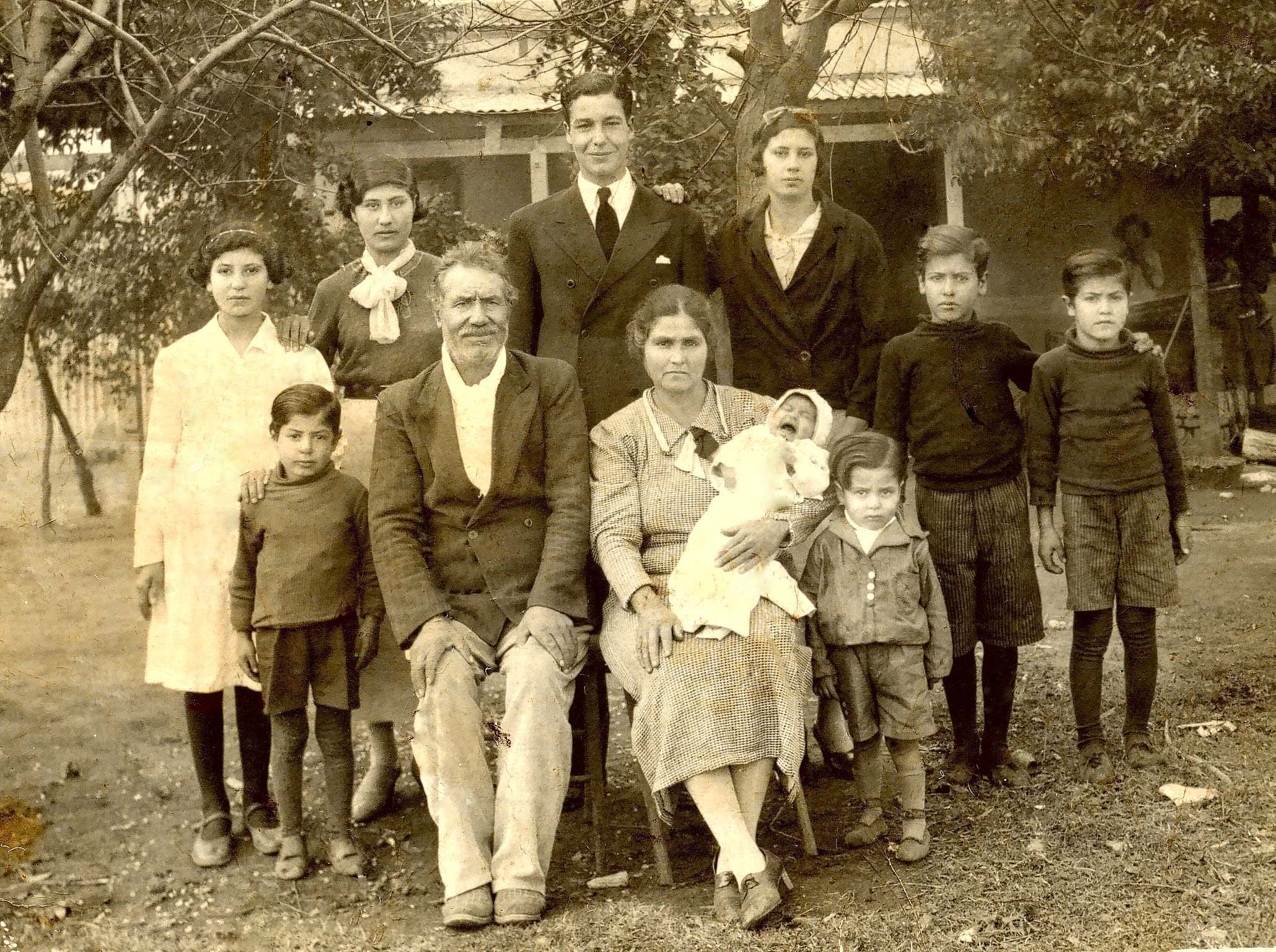
A Spanish immigrant family in the town of Arias, Córdoba.

Most of these European immigrants settled in the cities which offered jobs, education and other opportunities enabling them to enter the middle class. Many also settled in the growing small towns along the expanding railway system and since the 1930s many rural workers have moved to the big cities.

Urban areas reflect the influence of European immigration, and most of the larger ones feature boulevards and diagonal avenues inspired by the redevelopment of Paris. Argentine cities were originally built in a colonial Spanish grid style, centered on a plaza overlooked by a cathedral and important government buildings. Many still retain this general layout, known as a damero, meaning checkerboard, since it is based on a pattern of square blocks. The city of La Plata, designed at the end of the 19th century by Pedro Benoit, combines the checkerboard layout with added diagonal avenues at fixed intervals, and was the first in South America with electric street lighting.

=== Provinces and districts ===
Flag	Province/District	Capital	Population (2023)	Rank	Density (/km^{2})	Avg. growth from 2010 census	Births (2024)	Rate	Deaths (2024)	Rate	Infant mortality rate (2024)
(Buenos Aires)	Buenos Aires City	–	3,083,770	4	15,372.5	0.64	21,454	6.9	30,117	9.7	4.9
(Buenos Aires Province)	Buenos Aires Province	La Plata	18,039,509	1	57.1	0.98	147,081	8.4	151,690	8.7	8.4
(Catamarca Province)	Catamarca Province	San Fernando del Valle de Catamarca	425,885	20	4.2	1.30	3,866	8.8	3,069	7.0	8.0
(Chaco Province)	Chaco Province	Resistencia	1,238,989	11	11.5	0.67	14,350	11.9	9,709	8.1	11.8
(Chubut Province)	Chubut Province	Rawson	649,330	18	2.7	1.42	5,054	8.4	3,655	6.1	5.3
(Córdoba Province, Argentina)	Córdoba Province	Córdoba	3,872,830	2	24.1	1.55	33,873	8.6	33,728	8.5	6.8
(Corrientes Province)	Corrientes Province	Corrientes	1,148,631	10	13.6	1.58	12,538	10.5	8,755	7.3	14.0
(Entre Ríos Province)	Entre Ríos Province	Paraná	1,423,136	8	18.1	1.20	12,548	8.6	11,889	8.2	8.8
(Formosa Province)	Formosa Province	Formosa	619,240	17	8.4	1.12	6,711	10.7	4,133	6.6	10.7
(Jujuy Province)	Jujuy Province	San Salvador de Jujuy	795,539	14	15.0	1.43	6,352	8.0	5,086	6.4	6.0
(La Pampa Province)	La Pampa Province	Santa Rosa	367,207	22	2.6	1.15	3,039	8.1	2,758	7.3	6.6
(La Rioja Province, Argentina)	La Rioja Province	La Rioja	408,760	21	4.3	1.19	3,503	8.7	2,681	6.7	11.7
(Mendoza Province)	Mendoza Province	Mendoza	2,049,411	5	13.5	1.23	18,505	9.1	15,073	7.4	7.6
(Misiones Province)	Misiones Province	Posadas	1,301,723	9	43.0	1.27	16,469	12.3	9,040	6.8	9.5
(Neuquén Province)	Neuquén Province	Neuquén	688,850	16	7.7	2.33	6,790	9.7	4,102	5.9	7.1
(Río Negro Province)	Río Negro Province	Viedma	775,610	15	3.8	1.48	6,721	8.6	5,172	6.6	8.3
(Salta Province)	Salta Province	Salta	1,476,539	7	9.3	1.43	14,410	9.7	9,030	6.1	10.1
(San Juan Province, Argentina)	San Juan Province	San Juan	805,830	13	9.1	1.54	8,701	10.3	5,800	6.9	9.2
(San Luis Province)	San Luis Province	San Luis	527,023	19	7.0	1.89	4,410	8.7	3,930	7.8	6.3
(Santa Cruz Province, Argentina)	Santa Cruz Province	Río Gallegos	392,904	23	1.4	1.65	2,696	8.1	1,713	5.1	7.0
(Santa Fe Province)	Santa Fe Province	Santa Fe de la Vera Cruz	3,616,227	3	26.7	0.90	33,713	9.2	32,330	8.8	8.2
(Santiago del Estero Province)	Santiago del Estero Province	Santiago del Estero	1,007,830	12	7.7	1.57	11,401	10.8	7,258	6.9	10.7
(Tierra del Fuego Province, Argentina)	Tierra del Fuego Province ^{a}	Ushuaia	186,285	24	8.8	3.43	1,259	6.9	734	4.0	5.6
(Tucumán Province)	Tucumán Province	San Miguel de Tucumán	1,753,523	6	75.6	1.36	16,661	9.4	12,956	7.3	10.2

^{a} Not including claims to the Islas Malvinas (Falkland Islands) and South Georgia and the South Sandwich Islands.

Population pyramid of each province in 2022

National pyramid

Buenos Aires

Córdoba

Santa Fe

Buenos Aires City

Misiones

Chaco

Santiago del Estero

Neuquén

Formosa

Santa Cruz

Tierra del Fuego

=== Structure of the population ===
According to the 2022 revision of the World Population Prospects the total population was 45,276,780 in 2021 – double the number in 1966 (for a 1.27% average annual growth rate in that period). The population below the age of 15 in 2022 was 22%, 66% was between 15 and 64, while 12% was 65 or older.

Year	Total population	Population percentage in age bracket		
Year	Total population	aged 0–14	aged 15–64	aged 65+
1950	17 150 000	31.2%	64.6%	4.2%
1955	18 928 000	31.3%	63.9%	4.8%
1960	20 616 000	30.8%	63.6%	5.6%
1965	22 283 000	30.2%	63.6%	6.2%
1970	23 963 000	29.3%	63.7%	7.0%
1975	26 049 000	29.4%	63.0%	7.6%
1980	28 094 000	30.4%	61.4%	8.2%
1985	30 305 000	31.0%	60.5%	8.5%
1990	32 527 000	30.7%	60.4%	8.9%
1995	34 768 000	29.6%	61.0%	9.4%
2000	36 784 000	28.5%	61.8%	9.7%
2005	38 592 000	27.3%	62.8%	9.9%
2010	40 788 000	25.5%	64.3%	10.2%
2015	43 132 000	25.2%	64.1%	10.7%
2020	45 377 000	23.6%	65.0%	11.4%
2025	47 011 000	20.1%	67.7%	12.2%

Population by Sex and Age Group (18.V.2022):

Age group	Male	Female	Total	%
Total	22 182 317	23 704 263	45 886 580	100
0–4	1 442 339	1 404 211	2 846 550	6.20
5–9	1 825 647	1 773 600	3 599 247	7.84
10–14	1 845 146	1 788 414	3 633 560	7.92
15–19	1 800 681	1 768 387	3 569 068	7.78
20–24	1 757 472	1 779 791	3 537 263	7.71
25–29	1 755 496	1 824 075	3 579 571	7.80
30–34	1 706 782	1 787 492	3 494 274	7.62
35–39	1 616 211	1 692 147	3 308 358	7.21
40–44	1 617 796	1 713 874	3 331 670	7.26
45–49	1 386 629	1 488 369	2 874 998	6.27
50–54	1 177 301	1 281 024	2 458 325	5.36
55–59	1 044 857	1 158 048	2 202 905	4.80
60–64	929 041	1 057 693	1 986 734	4.33
65–69	796 143	946 014	1 742 157	3.80
70–74	627 993	799 212	1 427 205	3.11
75–79	424 945	611 035	1 035 980	2.26
80+	427 838	830 877	1 258 715	2.74
Age group	Male	Female	Total	Percent
0–14	5 113 132	4 966 225	10 079 357	21.97
15–64	14 792 266	15 550 900	30 343 166	66.12
65+	2 276 919	3 187 138	5 464 057	11.91

Population by Sex and Age Group (27.X.2010):

Age group	Male	Female	Total	%
Total	19 523 766	20 593 330	40 117 096	100
0–4	1 697 972	1 639 680	3 337 652	8.32
5–9	1 717 752	1 663 467	3 381 219	8.43
10–14	1 779 372	1 724 074	3 503 446	8.73
15–19	1 785 061	1 757 006	3 542 067	8.83
20–24	1 648 456	1 651 693	3 300 149	8.23
25–29	1 552 106	1 578 403	3 130 509	7.80
30–34	1 523 342	1 575 371	3 098 713	7.72
35–39	1 311 528	1 366 907	2 678 435	6.68
40–44	1 125 887	1 184 888	2 310 775	5.76
45–49	1 067 468	1 128 882	2 196 350	5.48
50–54	986 196	1 056 797	2 042 993	5.09
55–59	893 570	975 380	1 868 950	4.66
60–64	760 914	860 276	1 621 190	4.04
65–69	588 569	704 492	1 293 061	3.22
70–74	438 438	577 459	1 015 897	2.53
75–79	321 481	480 178	801 659	2.00
80+	325 654	668 377	994 031	2.48
Age group	Male	Female	Total	Percent
0–14	5 195 096	5 027 221	10 222 317	25.48
15–64	12 654 528	13 135 603	25 790 131	64.29
65+	1 674 142	2 430 506	4 104 648	10.23

== Vital statistics ==
The table below gives an overview of the number of birth and deaths in Argentina during the past century. Several sources were combined to compile the table.

The number of births in 2023 (460,902) was 41% below the record set in 2014, while the number of deaths was 353,428. As the population of Argentina showed a five-fold increase during the past century, the birth rate in 2023 (9.9) was a record low – now comparable to most European countries.

Death rates declined rapidly in the half century until around 1940 – then more gradually as the country's population aged. The death rate in 2023 (7.6) was near historic lows after having briefly risen in 2021 to the highest rate (9.5) since 1947 due to the COVID-19 pandemic.

Birth rates were relatively stable from 1934 through 1980, and after declining stabilized from 1995 to 2015 – before again declining sharply since then.

	Average population (June 30)	Live births	Deaths	Natural change	Crude birth rate (per 1000)	Crude death rate (per 1000)	Natural change (per 1000)	Crude migration (per 1000)	Total fertility rate	Infant mortality rate
1910	6,800,000	260,000	129,000	131,000	38.3	18.9	19.4		5.26	
1911	7,070,000	268,000	129,000	139,000	37.9	18.2	19.7	19.3	5.24	148.0
1912	7,470,000	288,000	127,000	161,000	38.6	17.0	21.6	33.8	5.43	143.0
1913	7,840,000	298,000	127,000	171,000	38.0	16.2	21.8	26.6	5.42	130.0
1914	8,000,000	294,000	123,000	171,000	36.7	15.4	21.3	−1.4	5.16	125.0
1915	8,150,000	288,000	129,000	159,000	35.3	15.8	19.5	−1.1	4.94	124.0
1916	8,300,000	293,000	142,000	151,000	35.3	17.1	18.2	−0.1	4.90	124.0
1917	8,450,000	284,000	136,000	148,000	33.6	16.1	17.5	0,2	4.64	128.0
1918	8,600,000	283,000	157,000	126,000	32.9	18.2	14.7	2.8	4.51	138.0
1919	8,750,000	286,000	161,000	125,000	32.7	18.4	14.3	2.9	4.45	134.0
1920	8,970,000	290,000	139,000	151,000	32.3	15.5	16.8	7.9	4.40	127.0
1921	9,220,000	302,000	146,000	156,000	32.8	15.8	17.0	10.5	4.47	116.0
1922	9,520,000	315,000	133,000	182,000	33.1	14.0	19.1	12.8	4.55	112.0
1923	9,890,000	336,000	146,000	190,000	34.0	14.8	19.2	18.9	4.74	112.0
1924	10,220,000	335,000	146,000	189,000	32.8	14.3	18.5	14.3	4.61	116.0
1925	10,500,000	334,000	148,000	186,000	31.8	14.1	17.7	9.2	4.49	121.0
1926	10,800,000	337,000	147,000	190,000	31.2	13.6	17.6	10.5	4.42	119.0
1927	11,130,000	342,000	157,000	185,000	30.7	14.1	16.6	13.4	4.38	126.0
1928	11,440,000	352,000	151,000	201,000	30.8	13.2	17.6	9.8	4.40	113.0
1929	11,750,000	355,000	162,000	193,000	30.2	13.8	16.4	10.3	4.33	107.0
1930	12,050,000	355,000	153,000	202,000	29.5	12.7	16.8	8.3	4.22	100.0
1931	12,290,000	350,000	156,000	194,000	28.5	12.7	15.8	3.8	4.07	100.0
1932	12,520,000	352,000	139,000	213,000	28.1	11.1	17.0	1.4	3.99	95.0
1933	12,730,000	332,000	150,000	182,000	26.1	11.8	14.3	2.2	3.67	87.0
1934	12,940,000	319,661	143,065	176,596	24.7	11.1	13.6	2.6	3.45	96.6
1935	13,150,000	322,002	162,768	159,234	24.5	12.4	12.1	3.9	3.39	105.6
1936	13,370,000	318,651	150,092	168,559	23.8	11.2	12.6	3.9	3.28	96.2
1937	13,610,000	319,024	154,275	164,749	23.4	11.3	12.1	5.6	3.20	95.4
1938	14,202,000	325,412	161,555	163,857	22.9	11.4	11.5	31.5	3.19	105.3
1939	14,397,000	329,393	149,153	180,240	22.9	10.4	12.5	1.0	3.14	91.7
1940	14,591,000	339,029	151,856	187,173	23.2	10.4	12.8	0.5	3.18	90.2
1941	14,796,000	340,339	148,947	191,392	23.0	10.1	12.9	0.9	3.11	84.8
1942	15,004,000	338,199	150,030	188,169	22.5	10.0	12.5	1.3	3.03	86.1
1943	15,216,000	358,977	150,166	208,811	23.6	9.9	13.7	0.2	3.12	79.8
1944	15,441,000	380,950	154,093	226,857	24.7	10.0	14.7	−0.1	3.23	80.7
1945	15,674,000	388,191	157,785	230,406	24.8	10.1	14.7	0.2	3.21	82.1
1946	15,912,000	387,496	149,895	237,601	24.4	9.4	14.9	0	3.12	79.0
1947	16,109,000	398,468	158,059	240,409	24.7	9.7	15.0	−2.7	3.14	77.1
1948	16,284,000	413,132	152,648	260,484	25.4	9.4	16.0	−5.3	3.19	69.5
1949	16,671,000	419,656	150,604	269,052	25.2	9.0	16.1	7.2	3.18	67.0
1950	17,150,000	438,766	154,540	284,226	25.6	9.0	16.6	11.7	3.26	68.2
1951	17,506,000	444,326	156,406	287,920	25.4	9.0	16.5	4.0	3.26	67.4
1952	17,865,000	446,156	153,887	292,269	25.0	8.6	16.4	3.8	3.22	64.3
1953	18,224,000	459,734	162,217	297,517	25.3	8.9	16.4	3.4	3.27	63.8
1954	18,580,000	457,559	156,347	301,212	24.6	8.4	16.2	3.0	3.21	60.4
1955	18,931,000	461,293	167,357	293,936	24.4	8.8	15.5	3.1	3.20	61.8
1956	19,277,000	474,142	161,321	312,821	24.6	8.4	16.2	1.8	3.24	57.0
1957	19,618,000	478,368	179,578	298,790	24.4	9.2	15.2	2.2	3.24	68.5
1958	19,955,000	472,865	166,235	306,630	23.7	8.3	15.4	1.5	3.16	61.4
1959	20,291,000	476,211	173,409	302,802	23.5	8.5	14.9	1.7	3.15	59.1
1960	20,625,000	473,038	179,266	293,772	22.9	8.7	14.2	2.0	3.08	62.4
1961	20,961,000	476,259	176,477	299,782	22.7	8.4	14.3	1.8	3.06	59.1
1962	21,297,000	490,414	184,013	306,401	23.0	8.6	14.4	1.4	3.11	58.7
1963	21,633,000	491,109	187,492	303,617	22.7	8.7	14.0	1.5	3.07	61.8
1964	21,966,000	496,256	193,141	303,115	22.6	8.8	13.8	1.4	3.05	58.3
1965	22,297,000	481,814	196,467	285,347	21.6	8.8	12.8	2.1	2.92	56.9
1966	22,622,000	479,396	194,450	284,946	21.2	8.6	12.6	1.8	2.87	53.4
1967	22,945,000	480,317	195,265	285,052	20.9	8.5	12.4	1.7	2.84	55.0
1968	23,273,000	493,354	213,313	280,041	21.2	9.2	12.0	2.1	2.87	59.9
1969	23,617,000	580,699	222,937	357,762	24.6	9.4	15.2	−0.6	3.34	52.5
1970	23,983,000	544,521	222,113	322,408	22.7	9.3	13.5	1.8	3.09	59.1
1971	24,376,000	564,787	225,256	339,531	23.2	9.2	14.0	2.2	3.16	61.1
1972	24,792,000	559,398	223,063	336,335	22.6	9.0	13.6	3.1	3.09	56.7
1973	25,222,000	569,469	228,508	340,961	22.6	9.1	13.5	3.8	3.06	55.4
1974	25,654,000	601,213	230,796	370,417	23.4	9.0	14.4	2.4	3.24	49.3
1975	26,079,000	619,945	229,291	390,654	23.8	8.8	15.0	1.3	3.29	43.2
1976	26,493,000	656,768	240,764	416,004	24.8	9.1	15.7	−0.1	3.44	44.4
1977	26,899,000	661,222	234,430	426,792	24.6	8.7	15.9	−0.8	3.43	44.5
1978	27,303,000	665,450	233,482	431,968	24.4	8.6	15.8	−1.0	3.41	40.8
1979	27,712,000	647,864	234,926	412,938	23.4	8.5	14.9	−0.1	3.29	38.5
1980	28,131,000	697,775	241,125	456,650	24.8	8.6	16.3	−1.4	3.49	33.2
1981	28,562,000	680,292	241,904	438,388	23.8	8.5	15.4	−0.3	3.37	33.6
1982	29,001,000	663,429	234,926	428,503	22.9	8.1	14.8	0.3	3.24	30.5
1983	29,448,000	655,876	233,071	422,805	22.3	7.9	14.4	0.8	3.15	29.7
1984	29,900,000	635,323	255,591	379,732	21.3	8.6	12.7	2.5	3.00	30.4
1985	30,354,000	650,783	241,377	409,406	21.5	8.0	13.5	1.5	3.02	26.2
1986	30,811,000	675,388	241,004	434,384	22.0	7.8	14.1	0.7	3.08	26.9
1987	31,270,000	668,136	249,882	418,254	21.4	8.0	13.4	1.3	2.99	26.6
1988	31,729,000	680,605	254,953	425,652	21.5	8.1	13.5	1.1	3.00	25.8
1989	32,187,000	667,058	252,302	414,756	20.8	7.9	12.9	1.4	2.89	25.7
1990	32,642,000	678,644	259,683	418,961	20.9	8.0	12.9	1.1	2.89	25.6
1991	33,094,000	694,776	255,609	439,167	21.0	7.7	13.3	0.4	2.91	24.7
1992	33,540,000	678,761	262,287	416,474	20.2	7.8	12.4	0.9	2.79	23.9
1993	33,982,000	667,518	267,286	400,232	19.6	7.9	11.8	1.2	2.70	22.9
1994	34,420,000	673,787	257,431	416,356	19.6	7.5	12.1	0.6	2.68	22.0
1995	34,855,000	658,735	268,997	389,738	18.9	7.7	11.2	1.3	2.58	22.2
1996	35,287,000	675,437	268,715	406,722	19.1	7.6	11.5	0.7	2.60	20.9
1997	35,715,000	692,357	270,910	421,447	19.4	7.6	11.8	0.2	2.63	18.8
1998	36,135,000	683,301	280,180	403,121	18.9	7.8	11.2	0.5	2.56	19.1
1999	36,541,000	686,748	289,543	397,205	18.8	7.9	10.9	0.2	2.54	17.6
2000	36,931,000	701,878	277,148	424,730	19.0	7.5	11.5	−1.0	2.57	16.6
2001	37,302,000	683,495	285,941	397,554	18.3	7.7	10.7	−0.7	2.50	16.3
2002	37,657,000	694,684	291,190	403,494	18.4	7.7	10.7	−1.3	2.48	16.8
2003	38,001,000	697,952	302,064	395,888	18.4	7.9	10.4	−1.4	2.46	16.5
2004	38,341,000	736,261	294,051	442,210	19.2	7.7	11.5	−2.7	2.57	14.4
2005	38,681,000	712,220	293,529	427,691	18.6	7.6	11.1	−2.3	2.45	13.3
2006	39,024,000	696,451	292,313	404,138	17.8	7.5	10.4	−1.6	2.37	12.9
2007	39,368,000	700,792	315,852	384,940	17.8	8.0	9.8	−1.0	2.36	13.3
2008	39,714,000	746,460	301,801	444,659	18.8	7.6	11.2	−2.5	2.49	12.5
2009	40,134,400	745,336	304,525	440,811	18.6	7.6	11.0	−0.5	2.46	12.1
2010	40,518,851	756,176	318,602	437,574	18.5	7.8	10.7	−1.3	2.47	11.9
2011	40,900,496	758,042	319,059	438,983	18.4	7.7	10.7	−1.4	2.45	11.7
2012	41,281,631	738,318	319,539	418,779	18.0	7.7	10.2	−0.9	2.28	11.1
2013	42,203,000	754,603	326,197	428,406	17.9	7.7	10.2	11.9	2.28	10.8
2014	42,669,500	777,012	325,539	451,437	18.2	7.6	10.6	0.4	2.33	10.6
2015	43,132,000	770,040	333,407	436,633	17.9	7.7	10.2	0.6	2.24	9.7
2016	43,590,000	728,035	352,992	375,043	16.7	8.2	8.5	1.9	2.13	9.7
2017	44,044,811	704,609	341,668	362,941	15.9	7.8	8.1	2.1	2.06	9.3
2018	44,494,502	685,394	336,823	348,571	15.4	7.6	7.8	2.3	2.00	8.8
2019	44,938,712	625,441	341,728	283,713	13.9	7.6	6.3	3.6	1.81	9.2
2020	45,376,763	533,299	376,219	157,080	11.8	8.3	3.5	6.3	1.61	8.4
2021	45,808,747	529,794	436,799	92,995	11.6	9.5	2.1	7.5	1.48	8.0
2022	46,135,579	495,295	397,115	98,180	10.7	8.6	2.1	3.0	1.39	8.4
2023	46,214,462	460,902	353,428	107,474	9.9	7.6	2.3	10.9	1.33	8.0
2024	46,301,743	413,135	376,405	36,730	8.9	8.1	0.8	8.0	1.23	8.5
2025	46,387,098	401,245			8.6				1.04	

=== Total fertility rate ===
==== By province ====
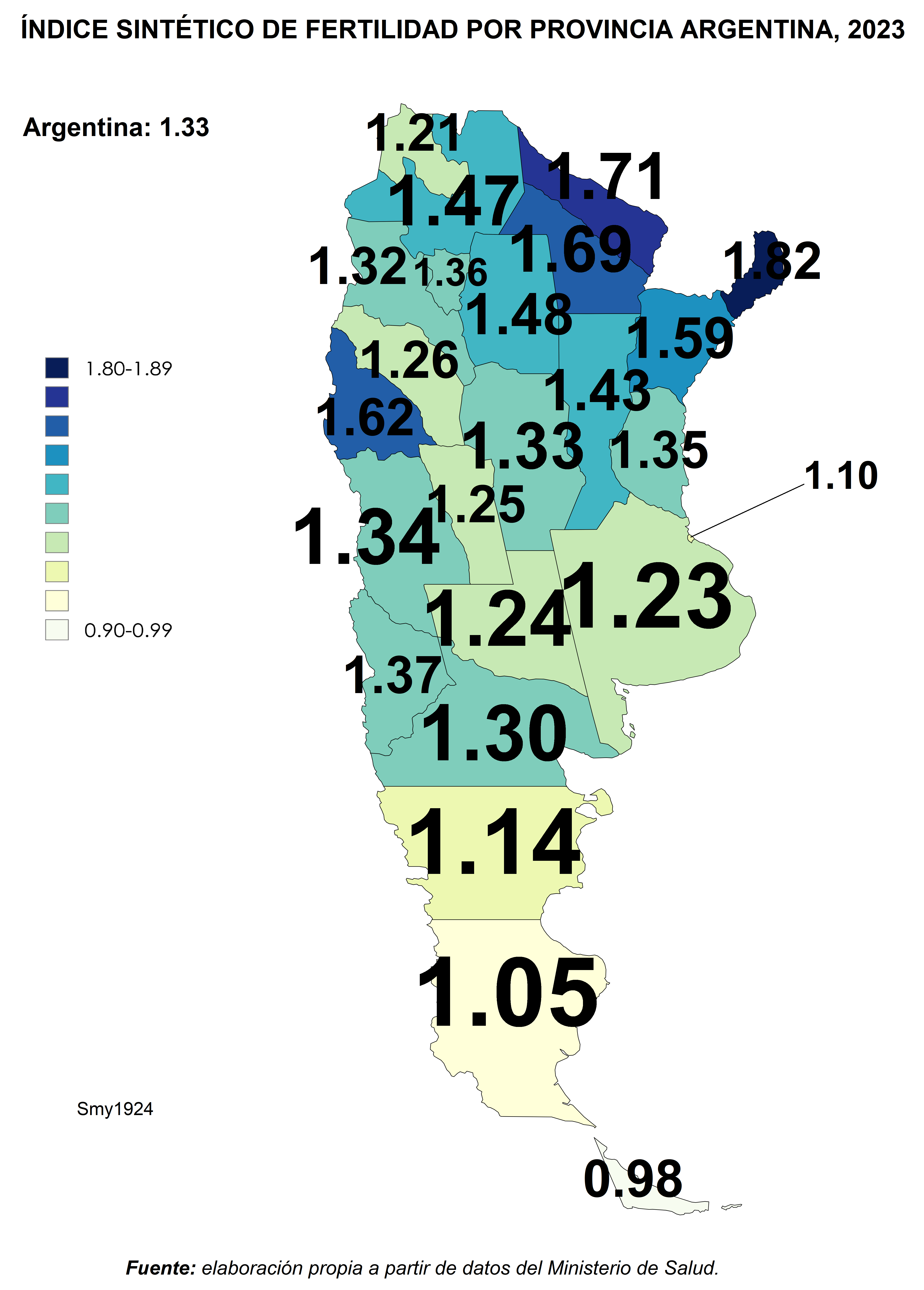
Total fertility rate by province in Argentina, 2023

Total fertility rate (TFR) in Argentina by province as of 2025:

2025
province	TFR
Misiones	1.42
Santiago del Estero	1.35
San Juan	1.21
Corrientes	1.16
Neuquén	1.10
Formosa	1.09
Mendoza	1.09
Salta	1.09
Santa Fe	1.05
Buenos Aires Province	1.04
Entre Ríos	1.04
Córdoba	1.04
Argentina	1.04
Tucumán	1.02
Santa Cruz	1.02
La Pampa	0.99
San Luis Province	0.95
Catamarca	0.94
La Rioja Province	0.94
Chubut	0.92
Río Negro Province	0.89
Chaco	0.85
Tierra del Fuego	0.85
Jujuy	0.74

View source data.
View source data.
View source data.
View source data.
View source data.

==== Before 1910 ====
Years	1869	1870	1871	1872	1873	1874	1875	1876	1877	1878
Total Fertility Rate in Argentina	6.80	6.73	6.65	6.58	6.58	6.57	6.57	6.57	6.57	6.56

Years	1879	1880	1881	1882	1883	1884	1885	1886	1887	1888
Total Fertility Rate in Argentina	6.56	6.56	6.56	6.55	6.47	6.39	6.30	6.22	6.14	6.09

Years	1889	1890	1891	1892	1893	1894	1895	1896	1897	1898
Total Fertility Rate in Argentina	6.04	5.99	5.94	5.90	6.26	6.63	7.00	6.48	5.96	5.96

Years	1899	1900	1901	1902	1903	1904	1905	1906	1907	1908
Total Fertility Rate in Argentina	5.95	5.95	5.94	5.94	5.88	5.82	5.76	5.70	5.64	5.56

Years	1909
Total Fertility Rate in Argentina	5.49

=== UN estimates ===
The Population Department of the United Nations prepared the following estimates of vital statistics of Argentina.

Period	Live births per year	Deaths per year	Natural change per year	CBR*	CDR*	NC*	TFR*	IMR*	Life expectancy		
Period	Live births per year	Deaths per year	Natural change per year	CBR*	CDR*	NC*	TFR*	IMR*	total	males	females
1950–1954	449,300	156,700	292,600	25.1	8.8	16.3	3.24	64.8	62.5	60.4	65.1
1955–1959	472,600	169,600	303,000	24.1	8.6	15.5	3.20	61.6	64.5	62.1	67.4
1960–1964	485,400	184,100	301,300	22.8	8.6	14.2	3.07	60.1	65.2	62.4	68.6
1965–1969	503,100	204,500	298,600	21.9	8.9	13.0	2.97	55.5	65.7	62.7	69.3
1970–1974	566,500	224,800	341,700	22.8	9.1	13.7	3.13	50.2	67.2	64.1	70.7
1975–1979	650,200	234,500	415,700	24.2	8.7	15.5	3.37	42.4	68.6	65.4	72.2
1980–1984	666,500	241,300	425,200	23.0	8.3	14.7	3.25	31.5	70.1	66.8	73.7
1985–1989	668,400	247,900	420,500	21.4	7.9	13.5	3.00	26.2	71.0	67.5	74.6
1990–1994	678,700	260,500	418,200	20.2	7.8	12.4	2.79	23.8	72.1	68.6	75.8
1995–1999	679,300	275,700	403,600	19.0	7.7	11.3	2.58	19.7	73.2	69.6	76.9
2000–2004	702,900	290,100	412,800	18.7	7.7	11.0	2.52	16.1	74.3	70.6	78.1
2005–2009	720,300	301,600	418,700	18.3	7.7	10.6	2.43	12.8	75.3	71.6	79.1
2010–2014	756,800	321,800	435,000	18.2	7.7	10.5	2.36	11.2	76.2	72.5	79.8
2015–2019	702,700	341,300	361,400	16.0	7.7	8.3	2.05	9.3	77.1	73.6	80.6
2020–2024	488,000	383,000	105,000	10.6	8.3	2.3	1.40	8.1	78.6	75.5	81.8
2025–2029				9.4	7.6	1.8	1.20				
* CBR = crude birth rate (per 1000); CDR = crude death rate (per 1000); NC = natural change (per 1000); IMR = infant mortality rate per 1000 births; TFR = total fertility rate (number of children per woman)

Historic population development of Argentina

Argentina's population continues to grow but at a slower rate because of its steadily declining birth rate. Argentina's fertility decline began earlier than in the rest of Latin America, occurring most rapidly between the early 20th century and the 1930s and then becoming more gradual.

Life expectancy has been improving, most notably among the young and the poor.

Demographic statistics according to the World Population Review.

- One birth every 1 minute
- One death every 1.4 minutes
- One net migrant every 111 minutes
- Net gain of one person every 3 minutes

== Ethnic groups ==
Ethno-racial groups in Argentina (2022 census)
1. Undeclared (mainly White, Mixed and East Asian) (96.5%)
2. Native (2.83%)
3. Black (0.66%)

In colonial times, the ethnic composition of Argentina was the result of the interaction of the pre-Columbian indigenous population with a colonizing population of Spanish origin and with sub-Saharan African slaves. Before the middle 19th century, the ethnic make up of Argentina was very similar to that of other countries of Latin America. Between 1857 and 1950 Argentina was the country with the second biggest immigration wave in the world, at 6.6 million, second only to the United States in the numbers of immigrants received (27 million) and ahead of other areas of new settlement like Canada, Brazil and Australia. However, mass European immigration did not have the same impact in the whole country. According to the 1914 national census, 30% of Argentina's population was foreign-born, including 50% of the people in the city of Buenos Aires, but foreigners were only 2% in the provinces of Catamarca and La Rioja (North West region). Strikingly, at those times, the national population doubled every two decades. This belief is endured in the popular saying "los argentinos descienden de los barcos" ('Argentines descend from the ships'). Therefore, most Argentines are descended from the 19th- and 20th-century immigrants of the great European immigration wave to Argentina (1850–1955), with a great majority of these immigrants coming from diverse European countries, particularly Italy and Spain.

Genetic ancestry of the average Argentine gene pool according to Caputo et al. (2021) using autosomal markers.
1. Caucasian Contribution (77.8%)
2. Amerindian Contribution (18.0%)
3. Sub-Saharan Contribution (4.20%)
Genetic ancestry of the Argentine gene pool according to Homburguer et al. (2015)
1. Caucasian Contribution (67.3%)
2. Amerindian Contribution (27.7%)
3. Sub-Saharan Contribution (3.60%)
4. East Asian Contribution (1.40%)

=== White Argentines ===
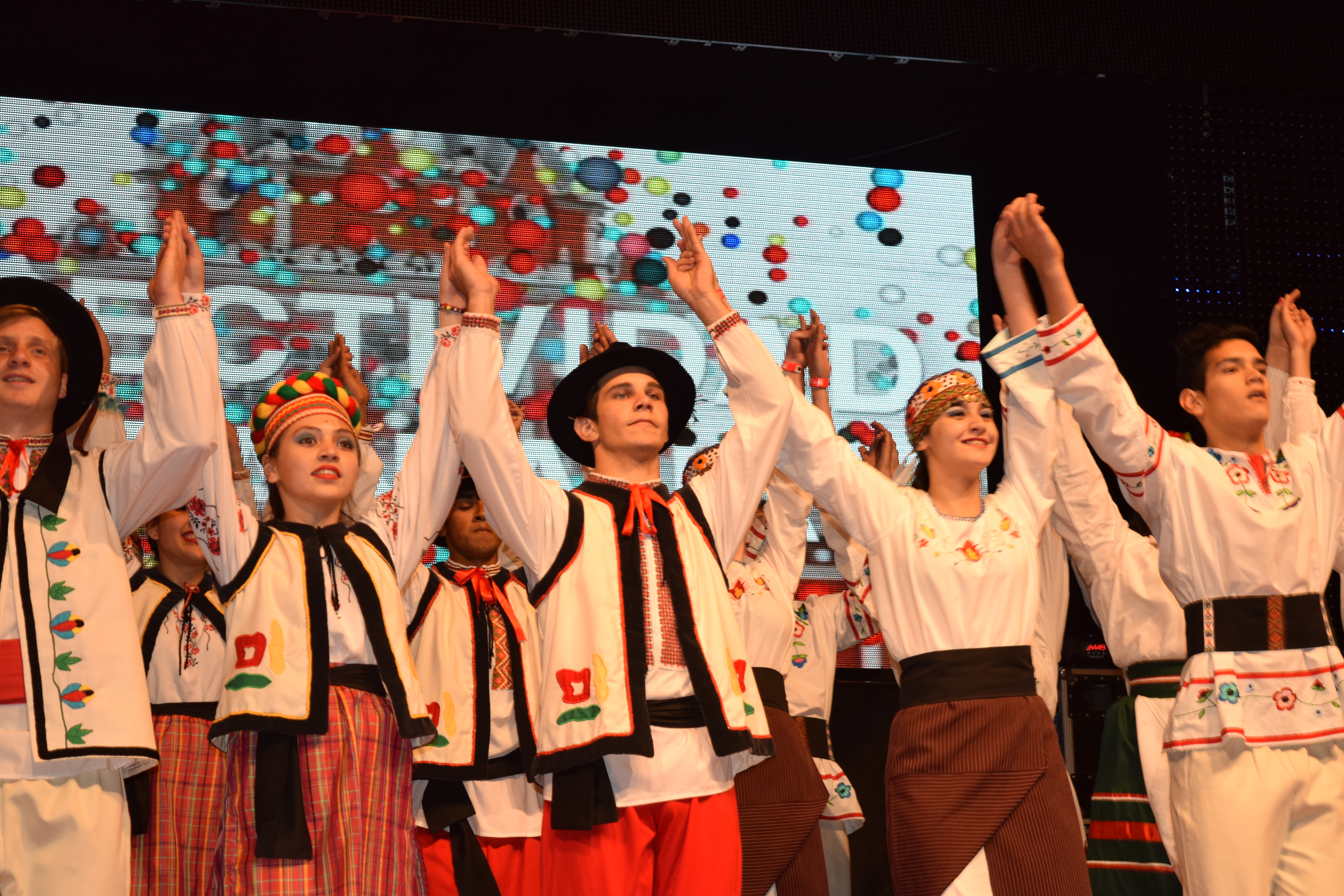
Argentines during the Immigrant's Festival in Oberá, Misiones.

There are no official census data or statistically significant studies on the precise number or percentage of white Argentinians today, but it is known that they are by far the largest group.

However, several ethnographic estimates have attempted to address the issue. According to an ethnic estimate by the UAEM for all Latin American countries, the white population of Argentina was 85% in 2005. Another estimate published in the Encyclopædia Britannica gives 86.4% in the year 2000. A recent estimate by the Joshua Project, updated to 2025, estimates 36,082,000 white Argentinians in a total population of 45,473,000, which is equivalent to 79.4% of the Argentinian population. Adjusted to the 46,735,004 inhabitants estimated by RENAPER, there would be a total of 37,109,200 white people in Argentina.

=== Indigenous peoples ===
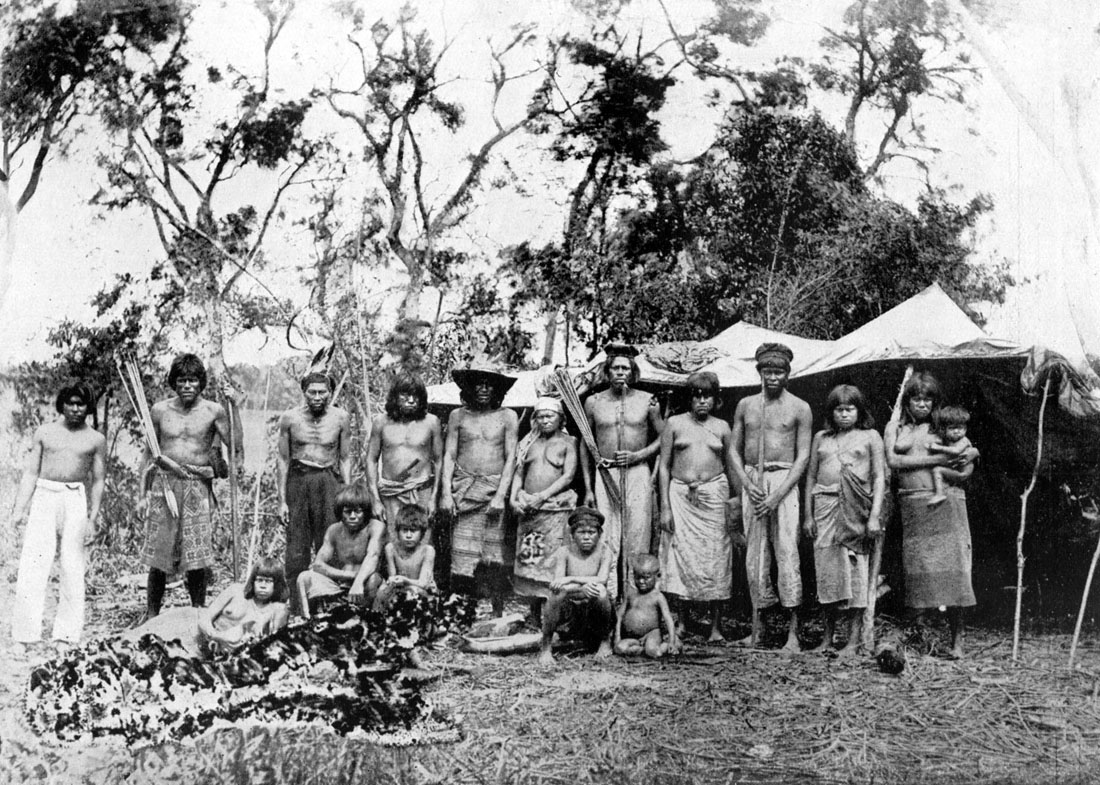
Small Toba community near the Pilcomayo River in 1892.

According to the data of INDEC's Complementary Survey of Indigenous Peoples (ECPI) 2004–2005, 600,000 officially recognized indigenous people (about 1.4% of the total population) reside in Argentina. The most numerous of these communities are the Mapuches, who live mostly in the south, the Kollas and Wichís, from the northwest, and the Guaranis and Qom, who live mostly in the northeast. In the census of 2010, 955,032 people self recognized as indigenous or descendants of indigenous peoples, thus representing 2.4% of the national population. This is notwithstanding that more than half of the population has at least one indigenous ancestor, although in most cases family memory lost that origin.

Indigenous population of Argentina
Ethnic group	Survey 2004–2005	
Ethnic group	Number	%
Aonikenk	10,590	1.8%
Atacama	3,044	0.5%
Avá-Guaraní	21,807	3.6%
Aymara	4,104	0.7%
Chané	4,376	0.7%
Charrúa	4,511	0.7%
Chorote	2,613	0.4%
Chulupí	553	0.1%
Comechingón	10,863	1.8%
Diaguita/diaguita calchaquí	31,753	5.3%
Guaraní	22,059	3.7%
Het	736	0.1%
Huarpe	14,633	2.4%
Kolla	70,505	11.7%
Lule	854	0.1%
Mapuche	113,680	18.8%
Mbyá	8,223	1.4%
Mocoví	15,837	2.6%
Omaguaca	1,553	0.3%
Pilagá	4,465	0.7%
Puelche	1,585	0.3%
Qom	69,452	11.5%
Quechua	6,739	1.1%
Rankulche	10,149	1.7%
Sanavirón	563	0.1%
Selkʼnam	696	0.1%
Tapiete	524	0.1%
Tonocoté	4,779	0.8%
Wichí	40,036	6.6%
Others	3,864	0.6%
Not specified	102,247	16.0%

=== Black Argentines ===
Since 2013, November 8 has been celebrated as the National Day of Afro-Argentines and African Culture. The date was chosen to commemorate the recorded date for the death of María Remedios del Valle, a rabona and guerrilla fighter, who served with the Army of the North in the war of Independence.

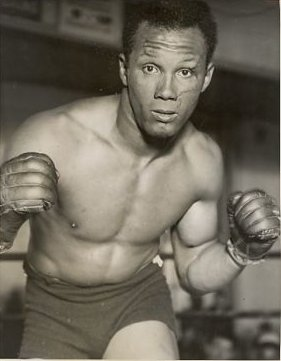
Santiago Lovell, Argentine boxer and gold medalist at the 1932 Summer Olympics.

The black population in Argentina declined since the middle 19th century from 15% of the total population in 1857 (Blacks and Mulatto people), to less than 0.5% at present (mainly mulattoes and immigrants from Cape Verde).

Afro-Argentines were up to a third of the population during colonial times; most were slaves brought from Africa to work for the criollos. The 1813 Assembly abolished slavery and led to the Freedom of Wombs Law of 1813, which automatically freed slaves' children at birth. Many Afro-Argentines contributed to the independence of Argentina such as María Remedios del Valle who is known as La Madre de la Patria ('mother of the fatherland') and Sgt. Juan Bautista Cabral. Also there is a debate among the historians as to whether or not Bernardino Rivadavia, the first president of the United Provinces of the Río de la Plata (Present Argentina) had African ancestors.

=== Immigration to Argentina ===
==== European settlement ====
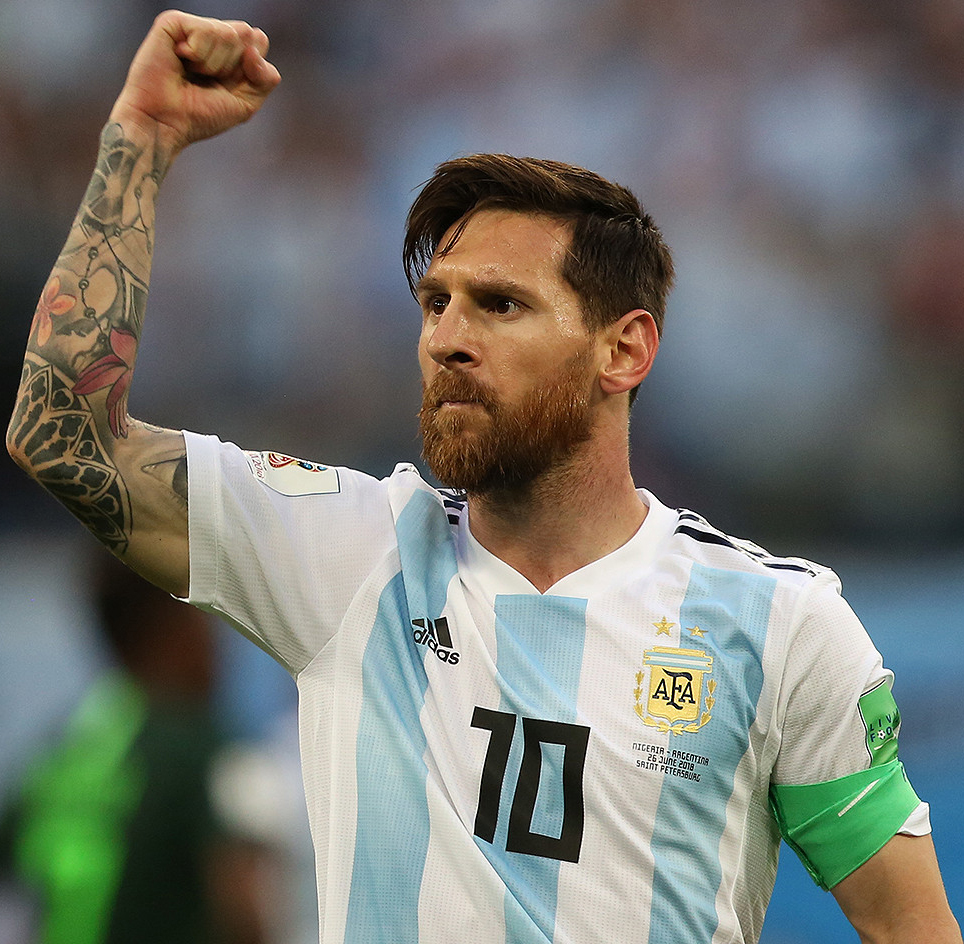
Lionel Messi, the football player with the most titles.

As with other areas of new settlement such as Canada, Australia, the United States, Brazil, and New Zealand, Argentina is considered a country of immigrants. By 1914, Argentina was only second to the United States in the number of immigrants received, ahead of Canada and Australia.

In the last national census, based on self-identification, 952,032 Argentines (2.4% of the population) declared to be Amerindians. Most of the 6.2 million European immigrants arriving between 1850 and 1950, regardless of origin, settled in several regions of the country. Due to this large-scale European immigration, Argentina's population more than doubled.

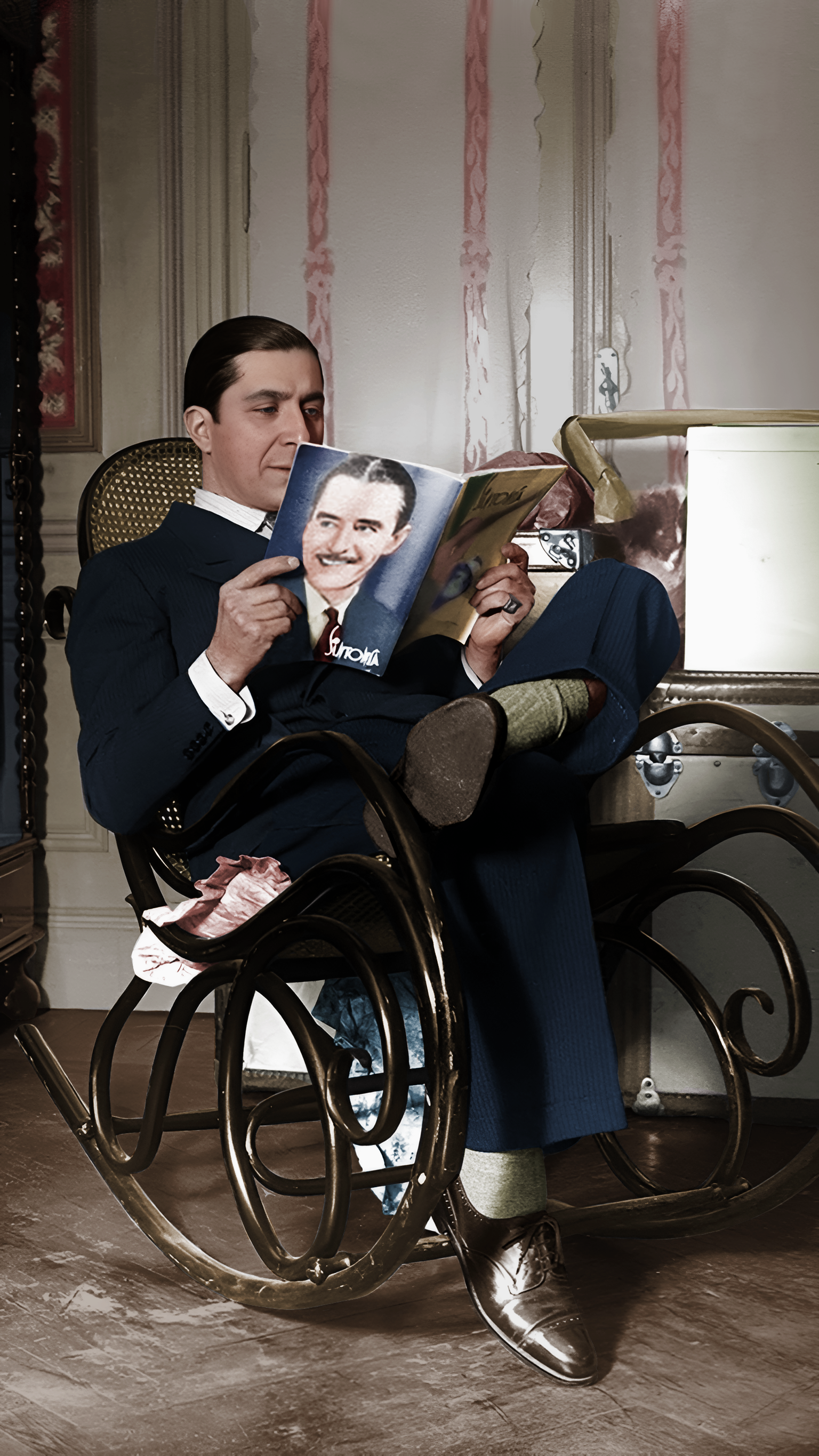
Carlos Gardel is the most famous representative of Tango.

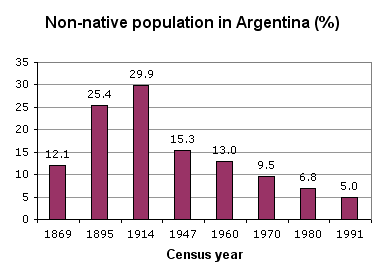
Immigrant population in Argentina (1869–1991)

The majority of these European immigrants came from Spain and Italy. Thousands of immigrants also came from France, Germany, England, Portugal, Brazil, Switzerland, Wales, Scotland, Poland, Albania, Yugoslavia, Czechoslovakia, the Austro-Hungarian Empire, the Ottoman Empire, Russia, Ukraine, Denmark, Sweden, Finland, Norway, Belgium, Luxembourg, the Netherlands, Romania, Bulgaria, Armenia, Greece, Lithuania, Estonia, and Latvia.

Italian population in Argentina arrived mainly from the northern Italian regions varying between Piedmont, Veneto and Lombardy, later from Campania and Calabria; Spanish immigrants were mainly Galicians and Basques. Thousands of immigrants also came from France (notably Béarn and the Northern Basque Country), Germany, Switzerland, Denmark, Sweden, Norway, Greece, Portugal, Finland, Russia and the United Kingdom. The Welsh settlement in Patagonia, known as Y Wladfa, began in 1865; mainly along the coast of Chubut Province. In addition to the main colony in Chubut, a smaller colony was set up in Santa Fe and another group settled at Coronel Suárez, southern Buenos Aires Province. Of the 50,000 Patagonians of Welsh descent, about 5,000 are Welsh speakers. The community is centered on the cities of Gaiman, Trelew and Trevelin.

==== Recent immigrants ====
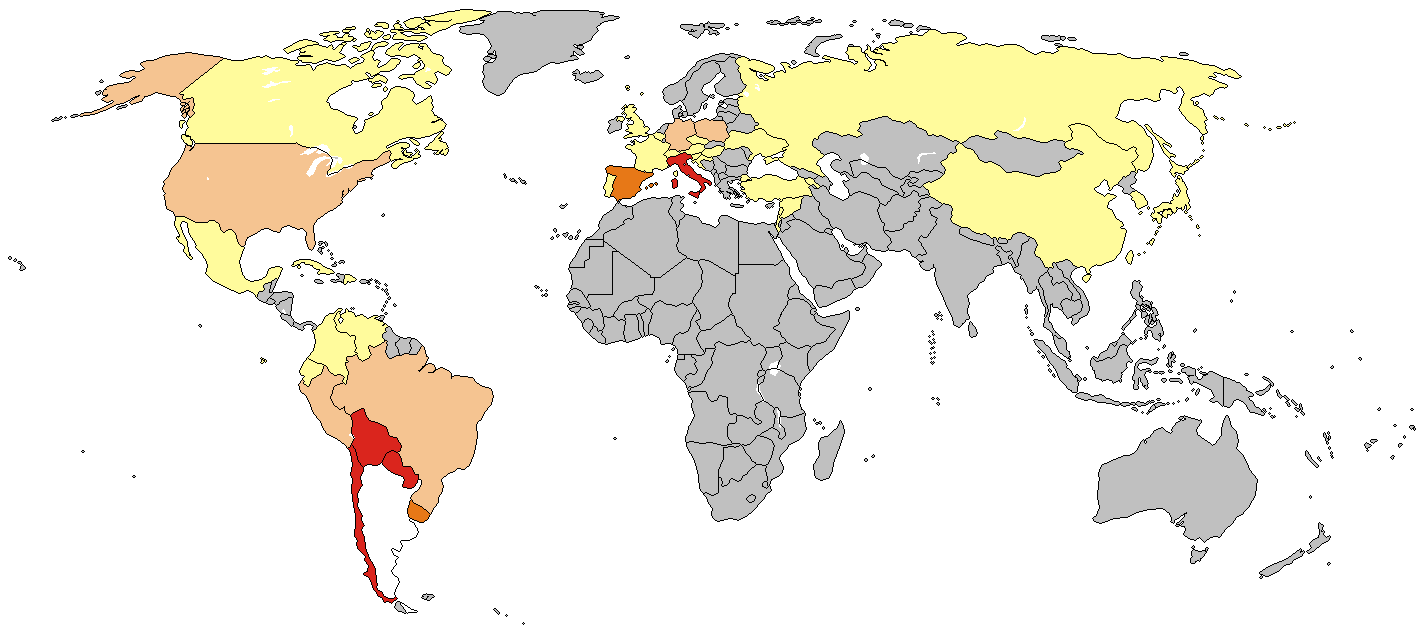
Foreign born residents in Argentina by country of birth

Population pyramid by country of birth

June 2026

According to the INDEC 1,531,940 of the Argentine resident population in 2001 were born outside Argentina, representing 4.22% of the total Argentine resident population. In 2010, 1,805,957 of the Argentine resident population were born outside Argentina, representing 4.50% of the total Argentine resident population. As of July 2023, more than 18,500 Russians have come to Argentina after the Russian invasion of Ukraine in 2022.

Illegal immigration has been a recent factor in Argentine demographics. Most illegal immigrants come from Bolivia and Paraguay, countries which border Argentina to the north. Smaller numbers arrive from Peru and Ecuador. The Argentine government estimates that 750,000 inhabitants lack official documents and has launched a program called Patria Grande ("Greater Homeland") to encourage illegal immigrants to regularize their status; so far over 670,000 applications have been processed under the program.

Rank (2022)	Country of birth	Census dates			
Rank (2022)	Country of birth	2022	2010	2001	1991
1	Paraguay	522,598	550,713	325,046	254,115
2	Bolivia	338,299	345,272	233,464	145,670
3	Venezuela	161,495	6,379	2,774	1,934
4	Peru	156,251	157,514	88,260	15,939
5	Chile	149,082	191,147	212,429	247,987
6	Uruguay	95,384	116,592	117,564	135,406
7	Italy	68,169	147,499	216,718	356,923
8	Brazil	49,943	41,330	34,712	33,966
9	Spain	48,492	94,030	134,417	244,212
10	Colombia	46,482	17,576	3,876	2,638
11	China	18,629	8,929	4,184	2,297
12	United States	13,896	N/D	N/D	N/D
13	Ecuador	8,879	N/D	N/D	N/D
14	Dominican Republic	7,817	N/D	N/D	N/D
15	Mexico	5,833	N/D	N/D	N/D
16	South Korea	5,337	7,321	8,290	8,371
17	Germany	4,087	8,416	10,362	15,451
18	France	3,960	6,995	6,578	6,309
19	Cuba	3,921	N/D	N/D	N/D
20	Ukraine	3,486	N/D	N/D	N/D
21	Portugal	3,281	N/D	N/D	N/D
22	Taiwan	3,018	2,875	3,511	1,870
23	Japan	2,703	4,036	4,753	5,674
24	Russia	2,169	N/D	N/D	N/D
25	Syria	1,324	1,337	2,350	N/D
26	Lebanon	N/D	933	1,619	3,171
	Other countries	235,928	121,018	127,683	150,849
Total		1,933,463	1,805,957	1,531,940	1,628,210

Distribution of ethnoracial groups in 2022

Native Argentines

Black Argentines
Population pyramids of ethnoracial groups in 2022

Native Argentines

Black Argentines

== Languages ==
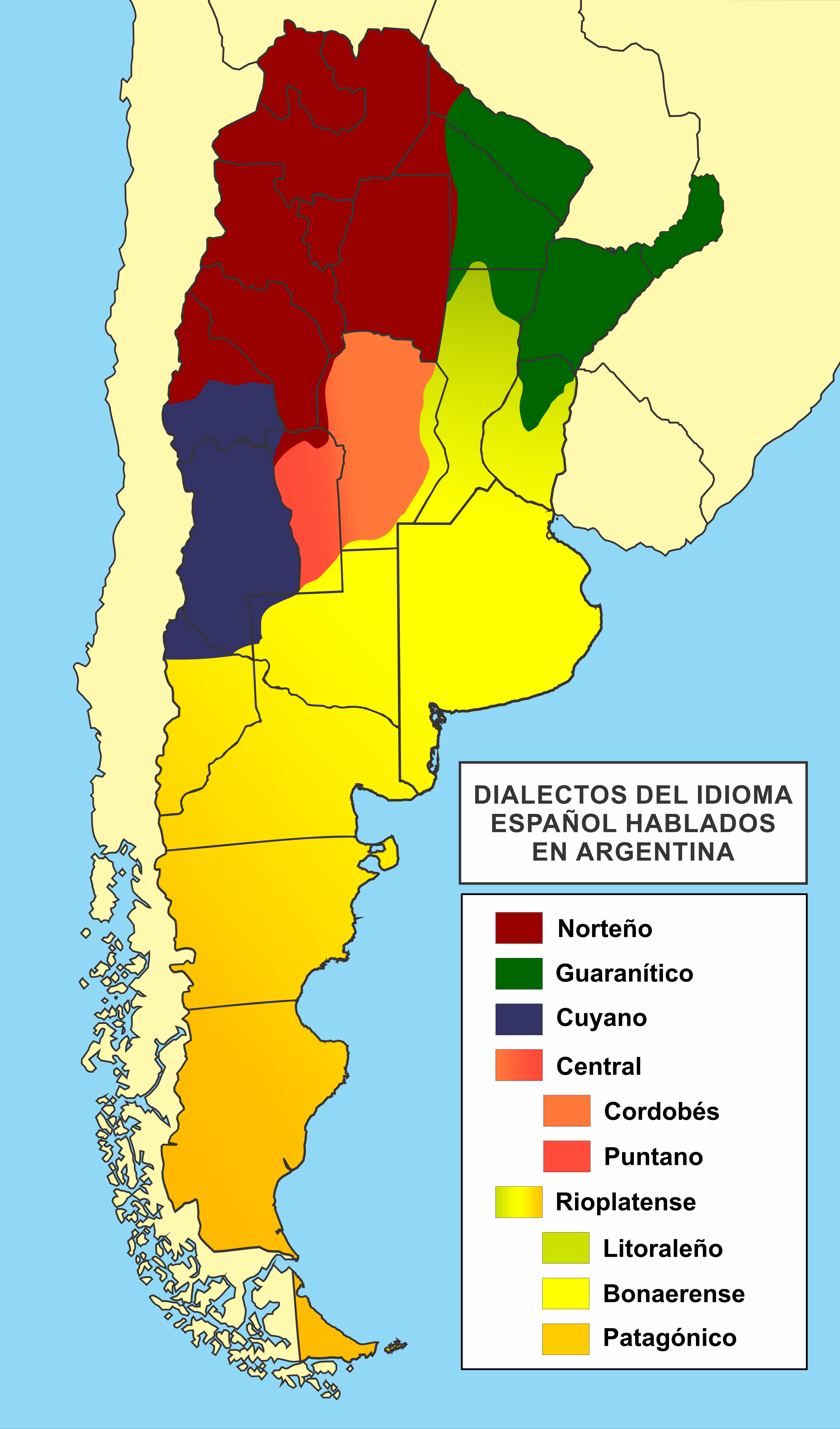
Dialectal variants of the Spanish language in Argentina.

The official language of Argentina is Spanish, and it is spoken by practically the entire population in several different accents. The most common variation of Spanish in Argentina is the Rioplatense Spanish (Spanish: castellano rioplatense), and it is so named because it evolved in the central areas around the Río de la Plata basin. Its distinctive feature is widespread voseo, the use of the pronoun vos instead of tú for the second person singular. Additionally, the Argentinian accent sounds identical to Portuguese in the words that begin with 'll' or 'yo', and all the words in Portuguese that begin with 'ch'. For example, the following sentence English: What is your name? Portuguese: como se chama? Spanish: Como se llama? – 'chama' & 'llama' are pronounced as though they were spelled "Shama"in both Argentinian Spanish and Portuguese. Moreover, the sound shift of all of the words in Spanish that begin with "ll" or 'y' but sound like 'sh' i.e., 'llorar' 'llama, 'llegar' & 'yo'. In Portuguese the words that begin with 'ch' always sound like 'sh'. There are many more words like these shown above. The mutual intelligibility between Spanish and Portuguese is already high, but the 'sh' sound increases the intelligibility between both languages even more.

=== Non-indigenous minority languages ===
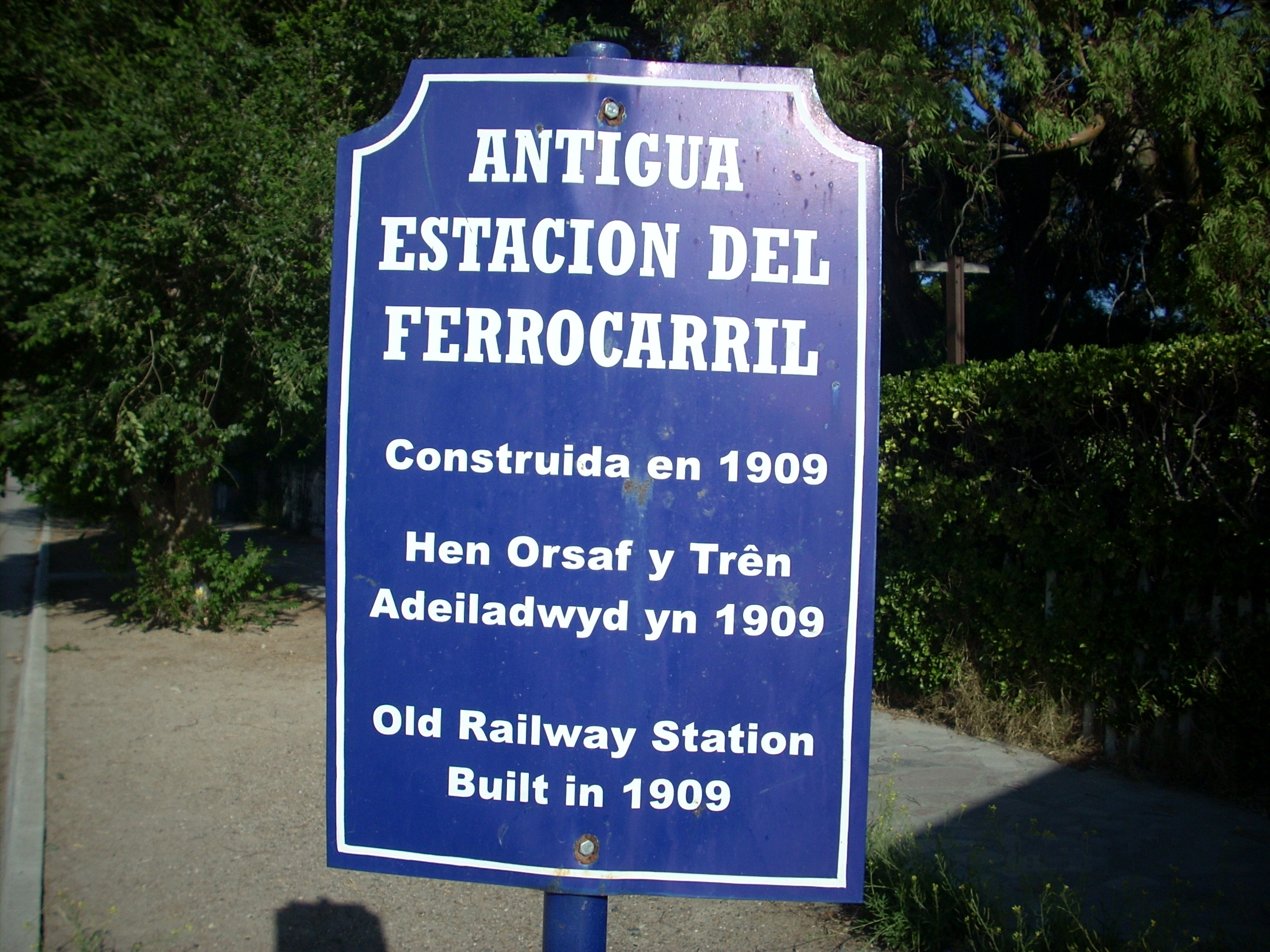
Spanish–Welsh–English sign in Gaiman, Chubut Province.

Many Argentines also speak other European languages (Italian, German, Portuguese, French, Welsh, Swedish and Croatian, as examples) due to the vast number of immigrants from Europe that came to Argentina.

English language is a required subject in many schools, and there are also many private English-teaching academies and institutions. Young people have become accustomed to English through movies and the Internet, and knowledge of the language is also required in most jobs, so most middle-class children and teenagers now speak, read and/or understand it with various degrees of proficiency. According to an official cultural consumption survey conducted in 2006, 42.3% of Argentines claim to speak some English (though only 15.4% of those claimed to have a high level of English comprehension).

There are sources of around one million Levantine Arabic speakers in Argentina, as a result of immigration from the Middle East, mostly from Syria and Lebanon.

Standard German is spoken by around 500,000 Argentines of German ancestry, though the number may be as high as 3,800,000 according to some sources. German is the third or fourth most spoken language in Argentina.

There is a prosperous community of Argentine Welsh-speakers of approximately 25,000 in the province of Chubut, in the Patagonia region, who descend from 19th century immigrants.

== Religion ==
Religion in Argentina (2021)
1. Catholicism (48.9%)
2. Evangelicalism (7.00%)
3. No religion (39.8%)
4. Islam (1.50%)
5. Judaism (1.00%)
6. Buddhism (0.50%)
7. Hinduism (0.10%)
8. Others (1.20%)

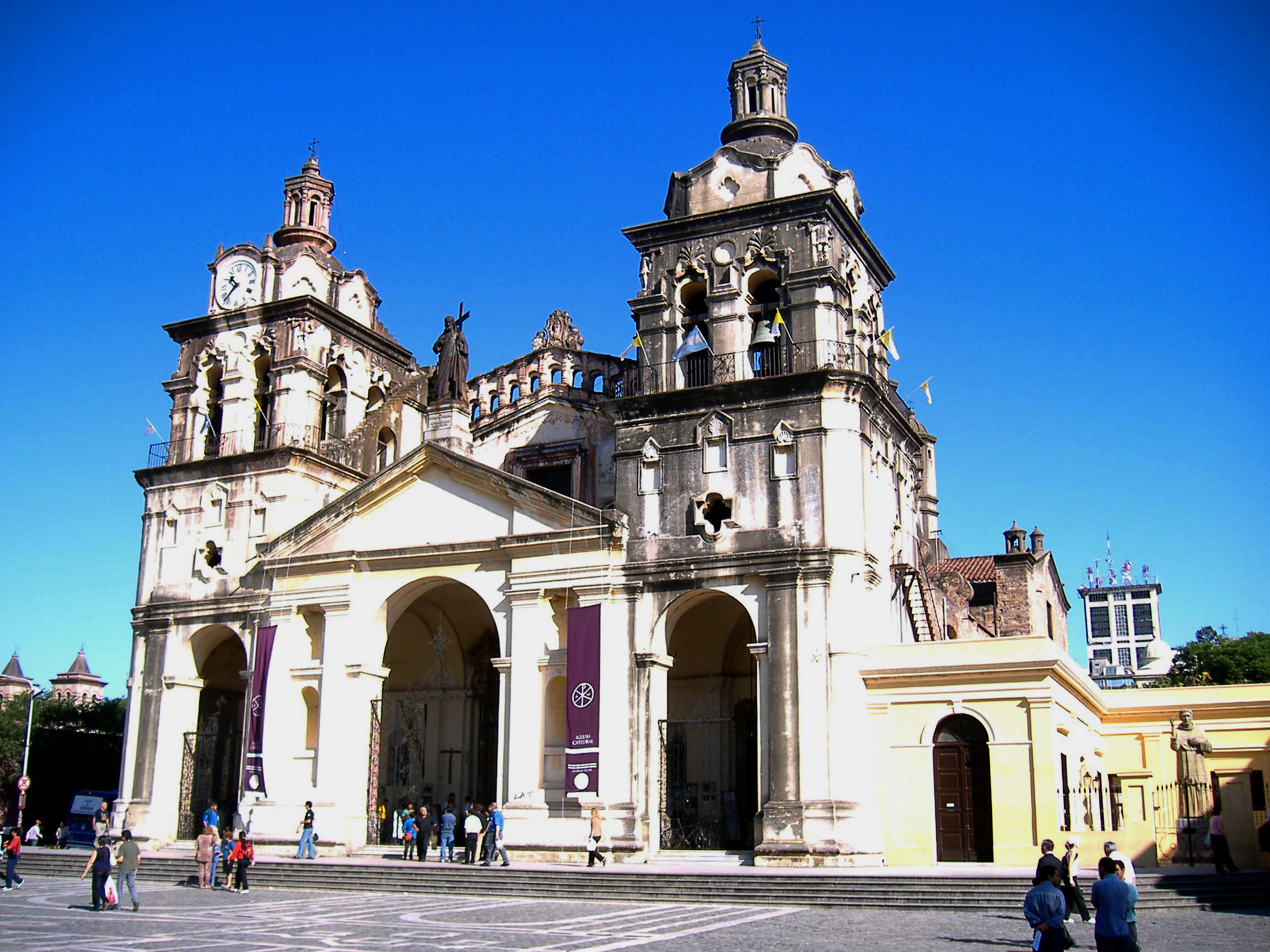
The 17th century Cathedral of Córdoba.

The Constitution guarantees freedom of religion, but until 1994 the President and Vice President had to be Catholic. The society, culture, and politics of Argentina are deeply imbued with Roman Catholicism.

Estimates for the number of Roman Catholics vary from 70% of the population, to as much as 90%. The CIA Factbook lists 92% of the country is Catholic, but only 20% are practicing regularly or weekly at a church service. The Jewish population is about 300,000 (around 0.75% of the population), the community numbered about 400,000 after World War II, but the appeal of Israel and economic and cultural pressures at home led many to leave; recent instability in Israel has resulted in a modest reversal of the trend since 2003. Muslim Argentines number about 500,000–600,000, or approximately 1.5% of the population; 93% of them are Sunni. Buenos Aires is home to one of the largest mosques in Latin America. A study from 2010 found that approximately 11% of Argentines are non-religious, including those who believe in God, though not religion, agnostics (4%) and atheists (5%). Overall, 24% attended religious services regularly. Protestants were the only group in which a majority regularly attended services.

== Gallery ==
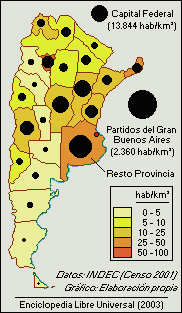
Population distribution by province

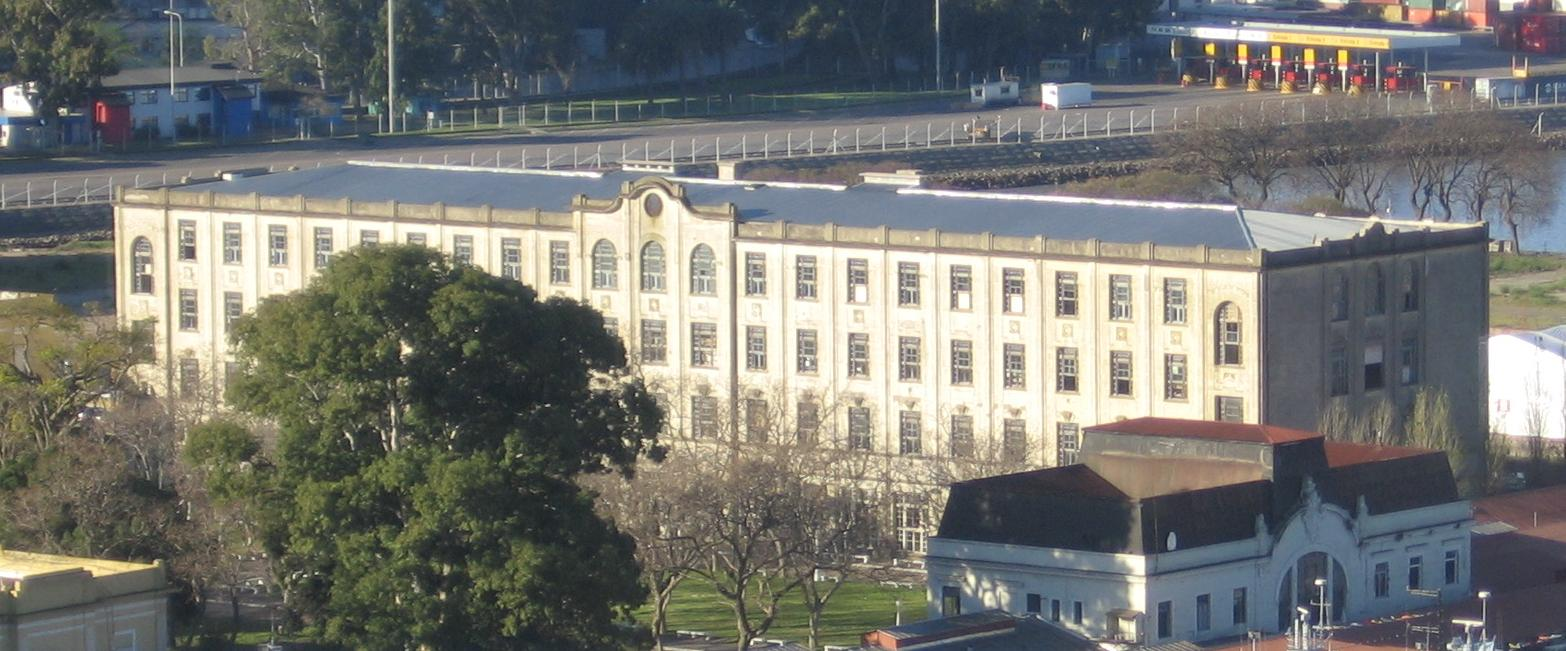
Built in 1906 to welcome hundreds of newcomers daily, the Hotel de Inmigrantes is now a national museum.

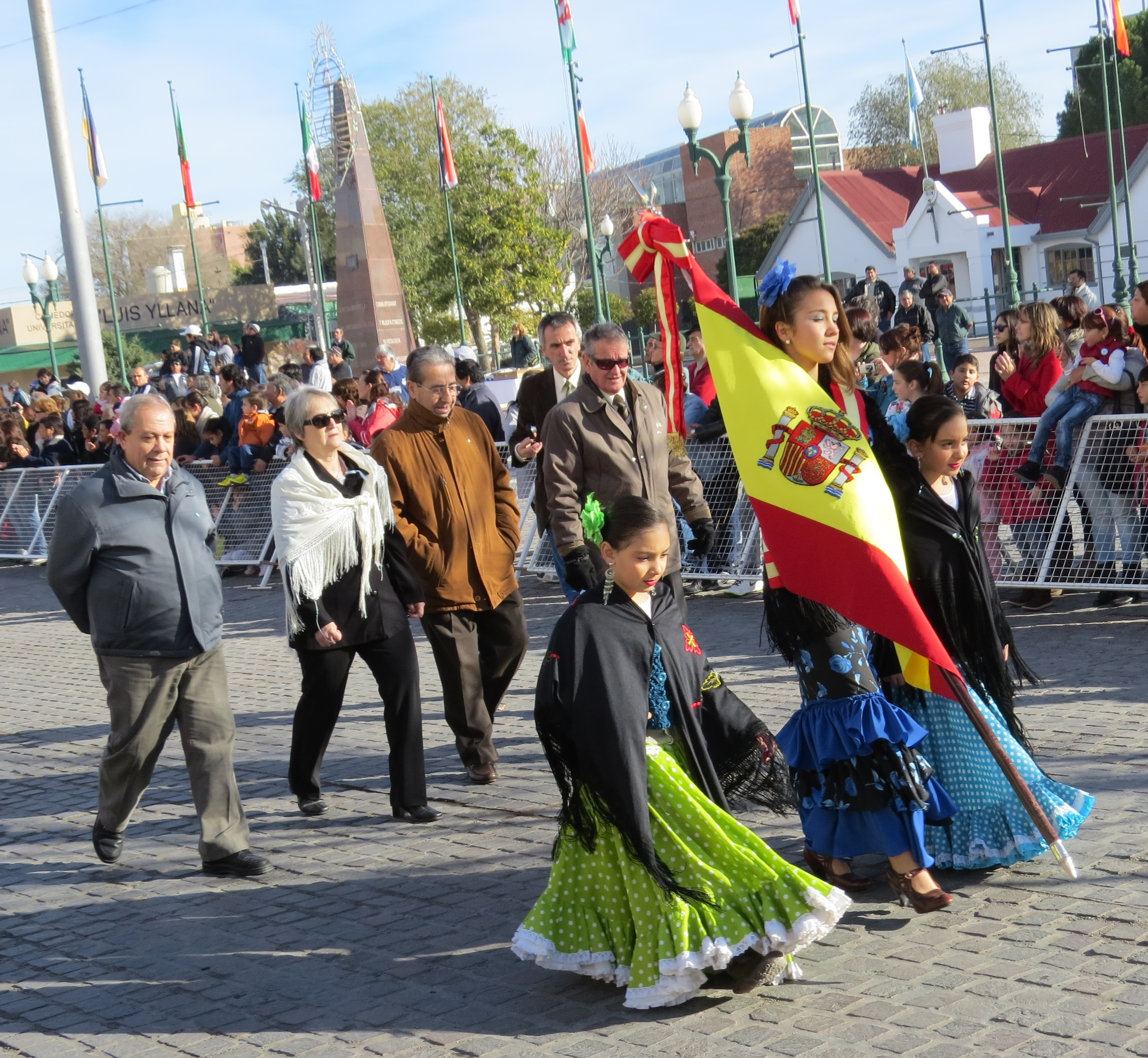
Spanish Argentines in the parade for May 25 in Trelew, Chubut.

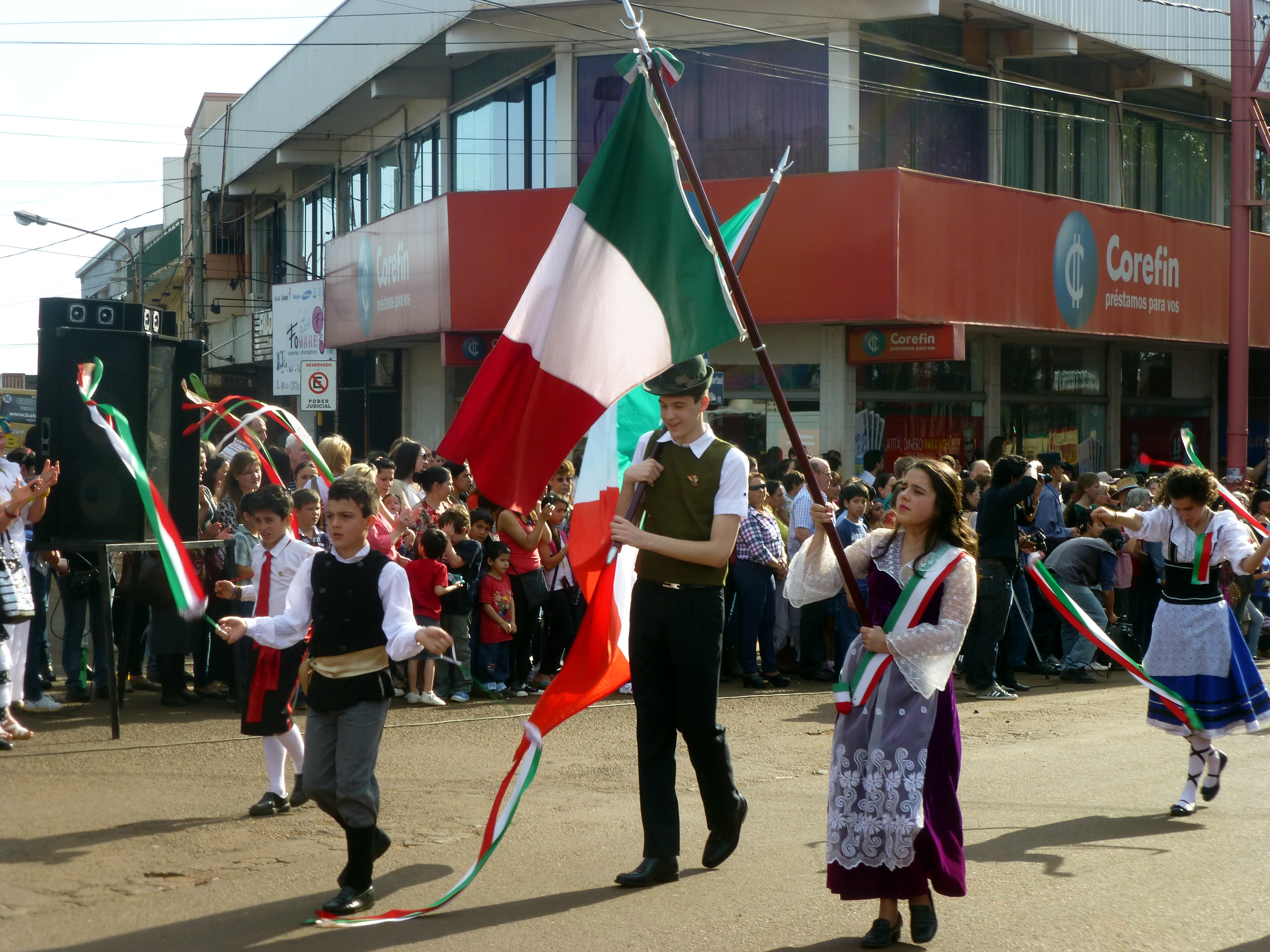
Italian Argentines during the opening parade of the Immigrant's Festival in Oberá, Misiones.

== See also ==
- Argentines
- National Institute of Statistics and Census of Argentina
- European Argentines
- Racism in Argentina
- List of largest cities in Argentina
- Immigration to Argentina
- Great European immigration
- Languages of Argentina
