= East Asian Argentines =

Argentinos orientales (Spanish)
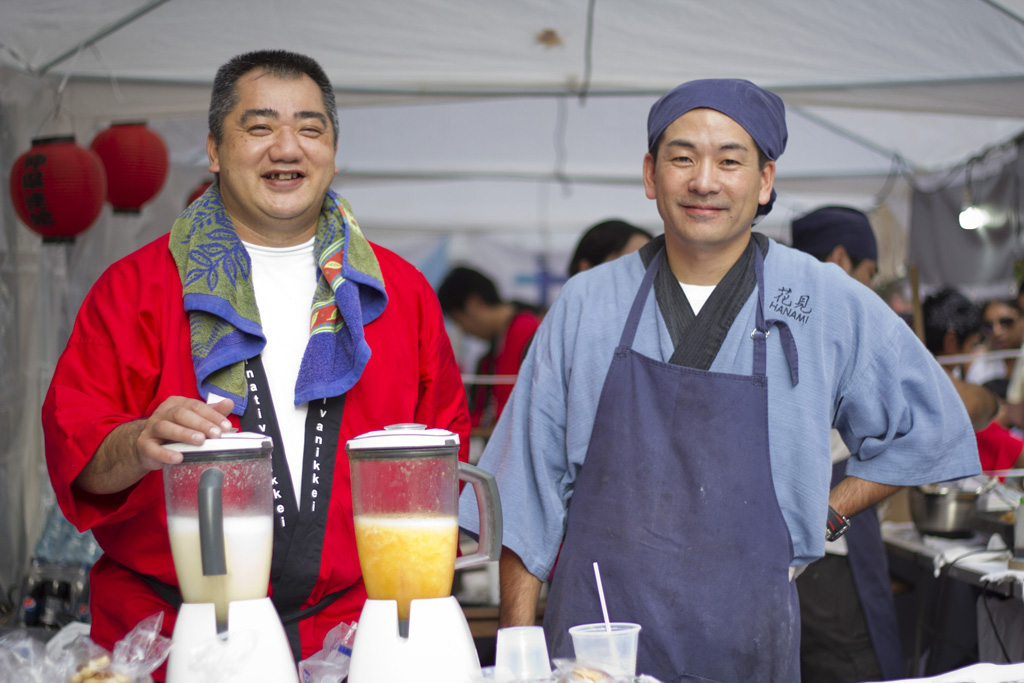
- Argentines at the Japanese stand of the 2012 Gastronomic Patio held in Buenos Aires

Total population
- East Asian ancestry predominates 380,000 (estimated); 0.8% of the Argentina's population There is no official census data

Regions with significant populations
- Predominantly in the Buenos Aires City

Languages
- Majority: Spanish; Minority: Mandarin · Japanese · Korean · Hakka · Cantonese · Laotian

Religion
- Majority: Catholicism; Minority: Taoism · Buddhism · Irreligion

Related ethnic groups
- East Asians; East Asian Americans · East Asian Canadians; East Asians in the United Kingdom

East Asian Argentines (Spanish: Argentinos orientales) are Argentines who have predominantly or total ancestry from the peoples of the Far East. East Asian Argentines are currently the fourth largest group in the Argentine Republic.

== History ==
The first Asians in Argentines were Filipinos, who were fellow subjects under Spanish colonization. Eventually, the Filipinos joined the Argentines in the Argentine War of Independence. Hippolyte Bouchard, who was a privateer for the Argentine Army who laid siege to Monterey, California, had in his second ship, the Santa Rosa, which was captained by the American Peter Corney, a multiethnic crew that included Filipinos.

In the 20th century, Argentina saw a wave of East Asian immigrants, particularly the Japanese came largely from Okinawa Prefecture in small numbers during the early 20th century. The overthrow of Juan Perón in 1955 precipitated a long period of unrest and economic instability that stemmed Japanese immigration after 1960. The second wave consisted primarily of Korean entrepreneurs, settling in Buenos Aires during the 1960s, a considerable number of people came from Hong Kong and the southern coastal region of China. The third wave was mostly composed of Chinese entrepreneurs, who settled in Buenos Aires during the 1990s, mostly from the coastal province of Fujian. Also arriving were a group full of young vagrants who often arrived via the illegal smuggling route originating in China's Fujian province. However, many of the small supermarkets that are present in many neighbourhoods of Buenos Aires come from the community present during the third wave of immigration. The first wave of immigrants came from small coastal towns between 1914 and 1949.

Laotian refugees first arrived in the country after the Vietnam War in 1975 and settled in Buenos Aires as part of a United Nations sponsored program. The community initially struggled at first, although it gradually strengthened with the founding of a Theravada Buddhist temple (although some have converted to Roman Catholicism) and Laotian-owned businesses.

== Demographics ==
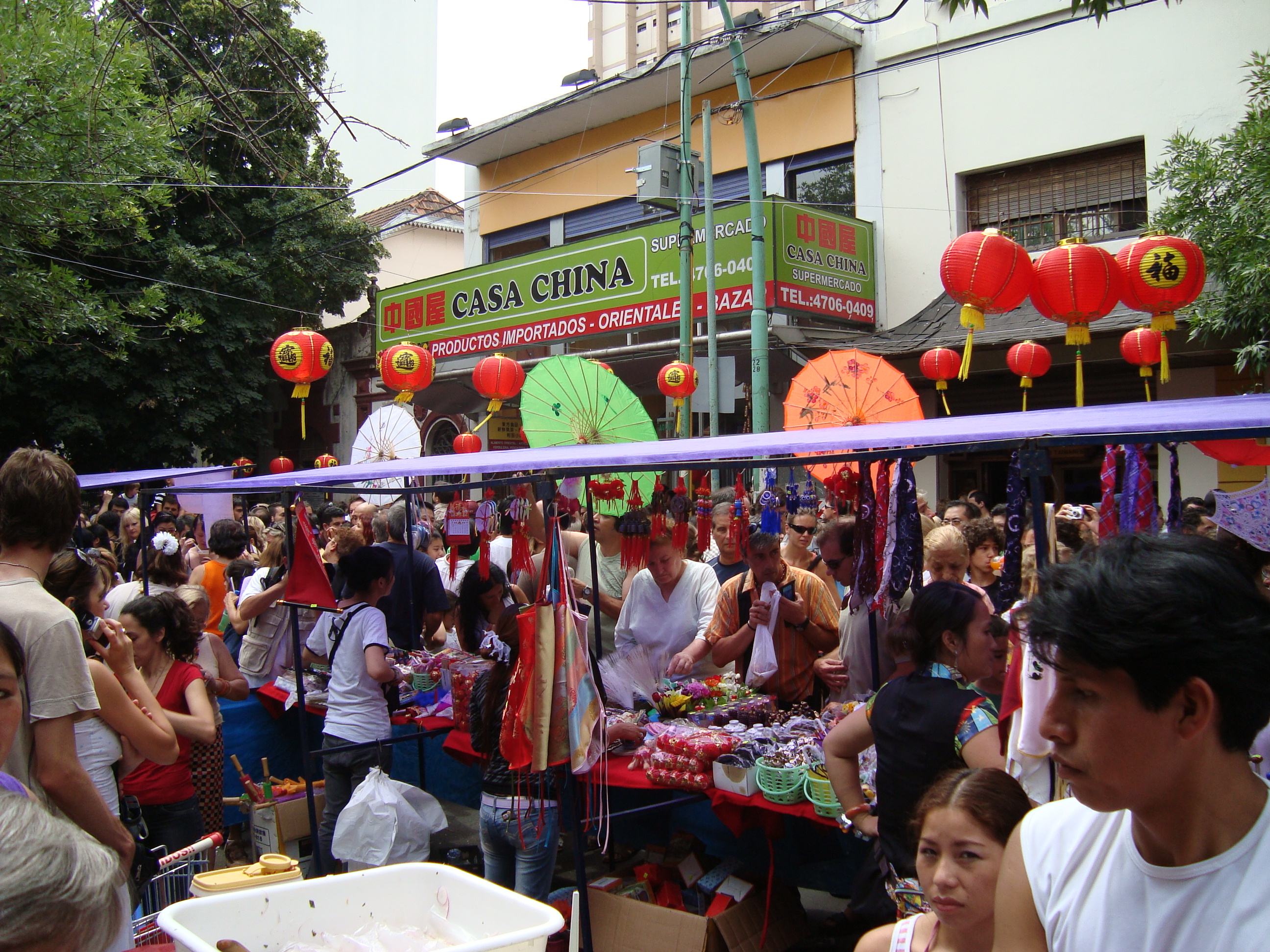
Lunar New Year celebration party in the Barrio Chino.

There is no official census data on the number of people in Argentina who have a predominantly or total ancestry from the Far East, only natives and blacks are counted in the latest censuses.

It is estimated that in the Buenos Aires City there is a greater proportion of East Asian Argentines due to the fact that it received a greater immigration of Chinese, Japanese and Koreans compared to the rest of the country.

== Buenos Aires' Chinatown ==
Buenos Aires' Chinatown is a largely commercial section five blocks long and two blocks wide in the barrio of Belgrano, Buenos Aires. This neighborhood contains several Chinese restaurants, grocery stores, and a Buddhist temple. It is the heart of the Chinese community in Argentina. The neighborhood began to develop in the 1980s when newly arrived Taiwanese and Chinese immigrants settled in this area. The neighborhood is also known for its Chinese New Year celebrations.

== Notable East Asian Argentines ==
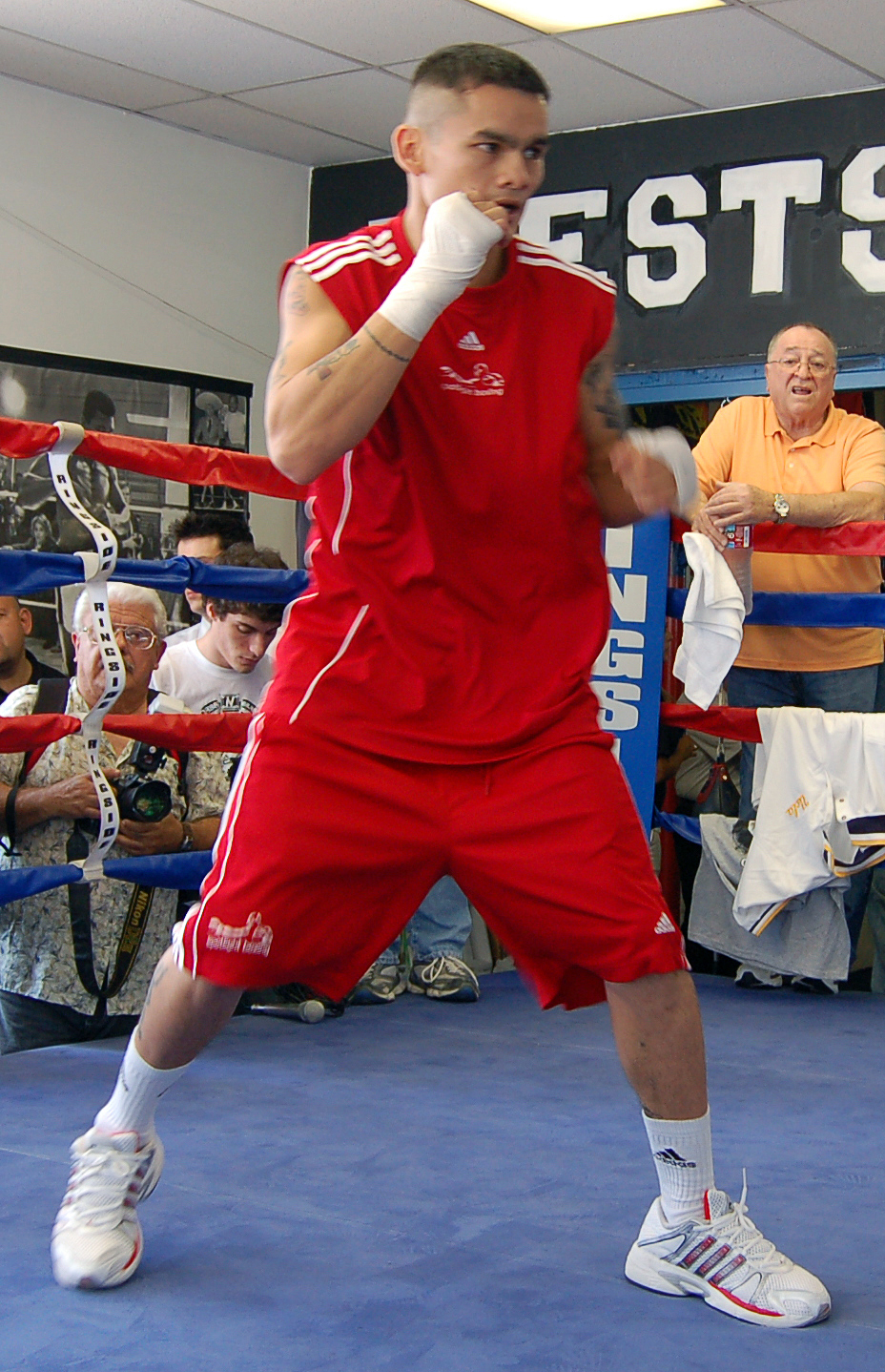
Marcos René Maidana is an Argentine former boxer.

- Marcos Maidana, former professional boxer
- Alicia Terada, politician
- Maria Chantal Videla, singer and actress
- Mario Alberto Ishii, politician
- María Kodama, writer and translator
- Chang Sung Kim, actor
- Leonardo Nam, actor
- Annabel, anisong singer
- Jae Park, lead singer of rock band Day6
- Liu Song, table tennis player
- Laura Russo, politician

== See also ==
- Ethnic groups of Argentina
- East Asian people
- Asian emigration
- Chinese diaspora
- Japanese diaspora
- Korean diaspora
- Laotian diaspora
- Filipino diaspora

=== Immigrant communities in Argentina ===
- Chinese Argentines
- Japanese Argentines
- Korean Argentines
