= Asian Argentines =

Argentinos asiáticos (Spanish)
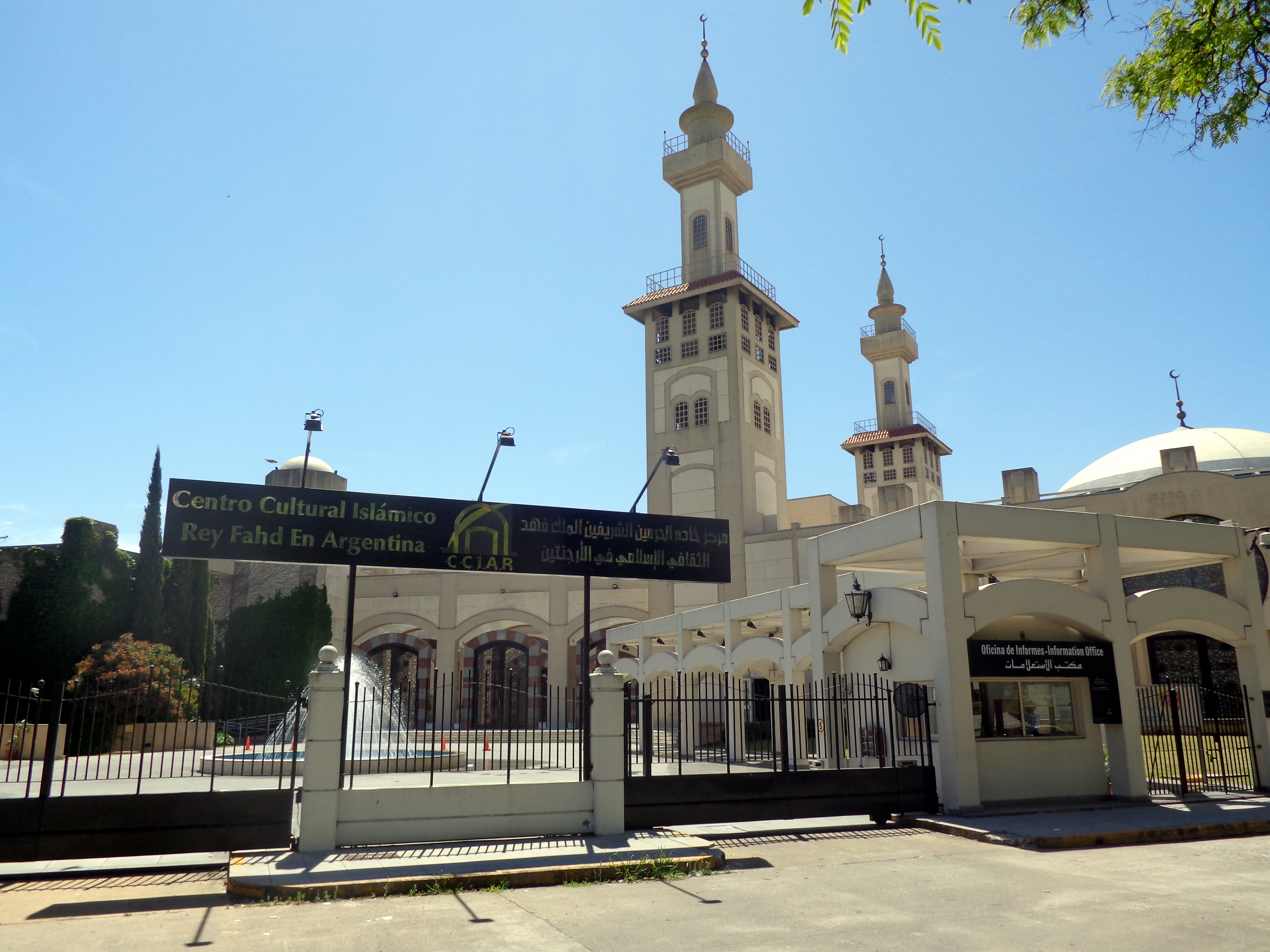
- The King Fahd Islamic Cultural Center, the largest mosque in Latin America

Total population
- 3,800,000 (estimated); There are no official data in the censuses: West Asia: 3,500,000; East Asia: 208,000; South Asia: 2,600; Southeast Asia: 2,000

Regions with significant populations
- Predominantly in Buenos Aires, Córdoba and the Argentine Northwest

Languages
- Spanish • Asian languages (including: Arabic; Mandarin; Min; Japanese; Korean; Punjabi; Turkish; Laotian)

Religion
- Buddhism; Hinduism; Christianity; Islam; Shinto; Sikhism; Jainism; Zoroastrianism; Baháʼí; Judaism; Taoism

Related ethnic groups
- Asian Latin Americans; Asian Americans; Asian Canadians; Asian Australians; Chinese; Arabs; Japanese; Koreans; Turks; Punjabis; Laotians

Asian Argentines (Spanish: Argentinos asiáticos), are Argentine citizens or residents of Asian ancestry. The vast majority trace their ancestry to West Asia, primarily from Lebanon, Syria and Armenia, and the Far East, primarily from China and Japan. However, there are other communities of Indian origin as well. Asian Argentines settled in Argentina in large numbers during several waves of immigration in the 20th century.

== History ==
The first Asian Argentines were Filipinos, who were fellow subjects under Spanish colonization. Eventually, the Filipinos joined the Argentines in the Argentine War of Independence. Filomeno V. Aguilar Jr. in his paper “Manilamen and seafaring: Engaging the Maritime World beyond the Spanish Realm” states that during the war, an Argentine of French descent, Hypolite Bouchard, who was a privateer for the Argentine Army who laid siege to Monterey, Californina, had in his second ship, the Santa Rosa, which was captained by the American Peter Corney, a multiethnic crew that included Filipinos. Mercene, who wrote the book “Manila Men,” proposes that those Manilamen were recruited in San Blas, an alternative port to Acapulco, Mexico, where several Filipinos had settled during the Manila-Acapulco galleon trade era.

In the 19th century, Argentina saw a wave of West Asian immigrants, particularly from Lebanon and Syria, which were then provinces of the Ottoman Empire because of the 1860 civil conflict in Mount Lebanon and Damascus. East Asian immigrants, particularly the Japanese came largely from Okinawa Prefecture in small numbers during the early 20th century. The overthrow of Juan Perón in 1955 precipitated a long period of unrest and economic instability that stemmed Japanese immigration after 1960. The second wave consisted primarily of Korean entrepreneurs, settling in Buenos Aires during the 1960s, and the third wave was mostly composed of Chinese entrepreneurs, who settled in Buenos Aires during the 1990s.

By the later half of the 20th century, Asian Argentines were active in politics, an example of a political party being a special Unidad Básica (Peronist) party office under the name Unión de Residentes Taiwaneses Justicialistas ("Union of Justicialist Taiwanese Residents) at the heart of Buenos Aires's Chinatown Arribeños & Mendoza. This branch later closed, presumably as assimilation continued, while a regular Unidad Básica opened across the street.

== Society ==
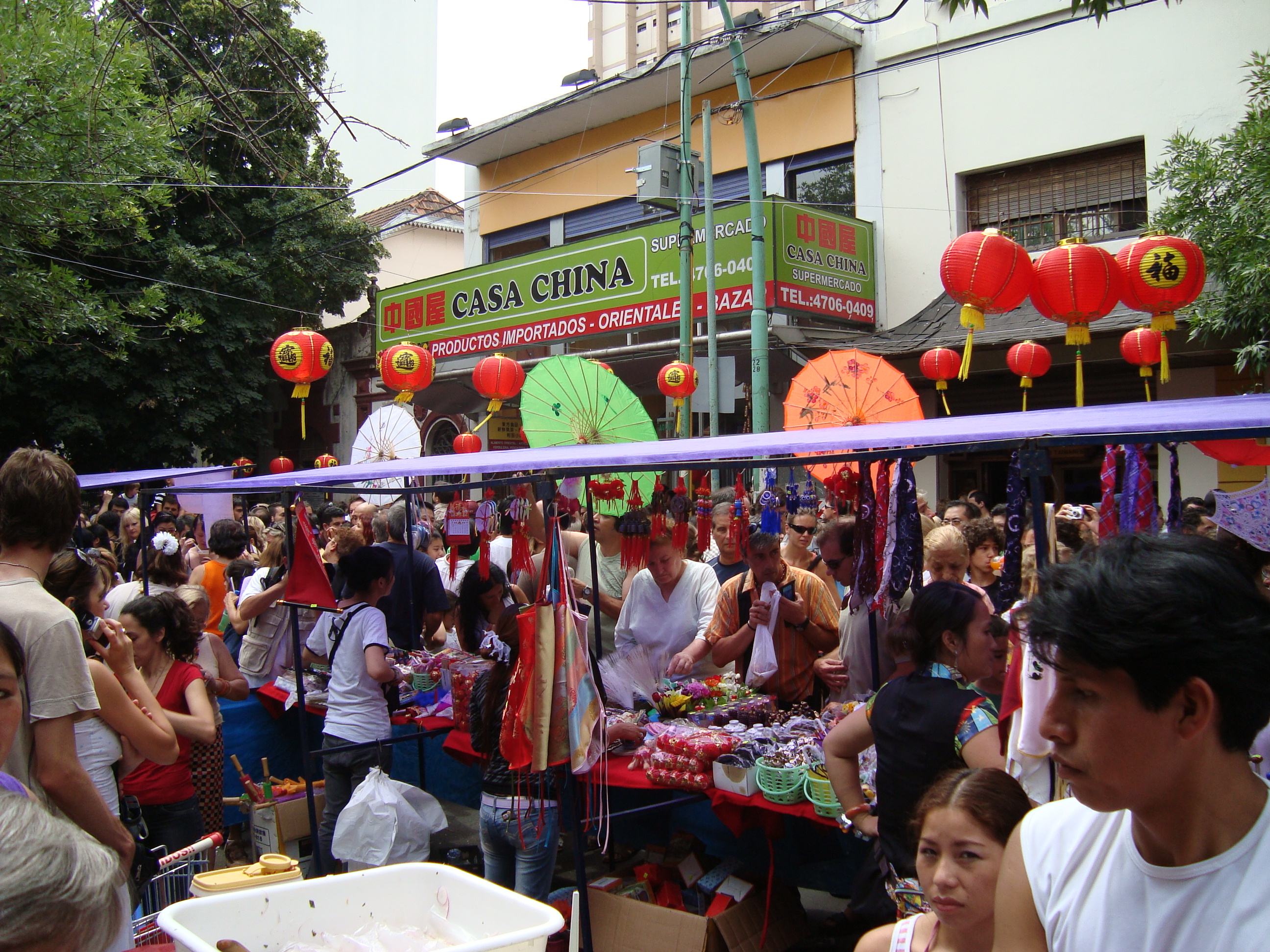
Lunar New Year celebration party in the Barrio Chino.

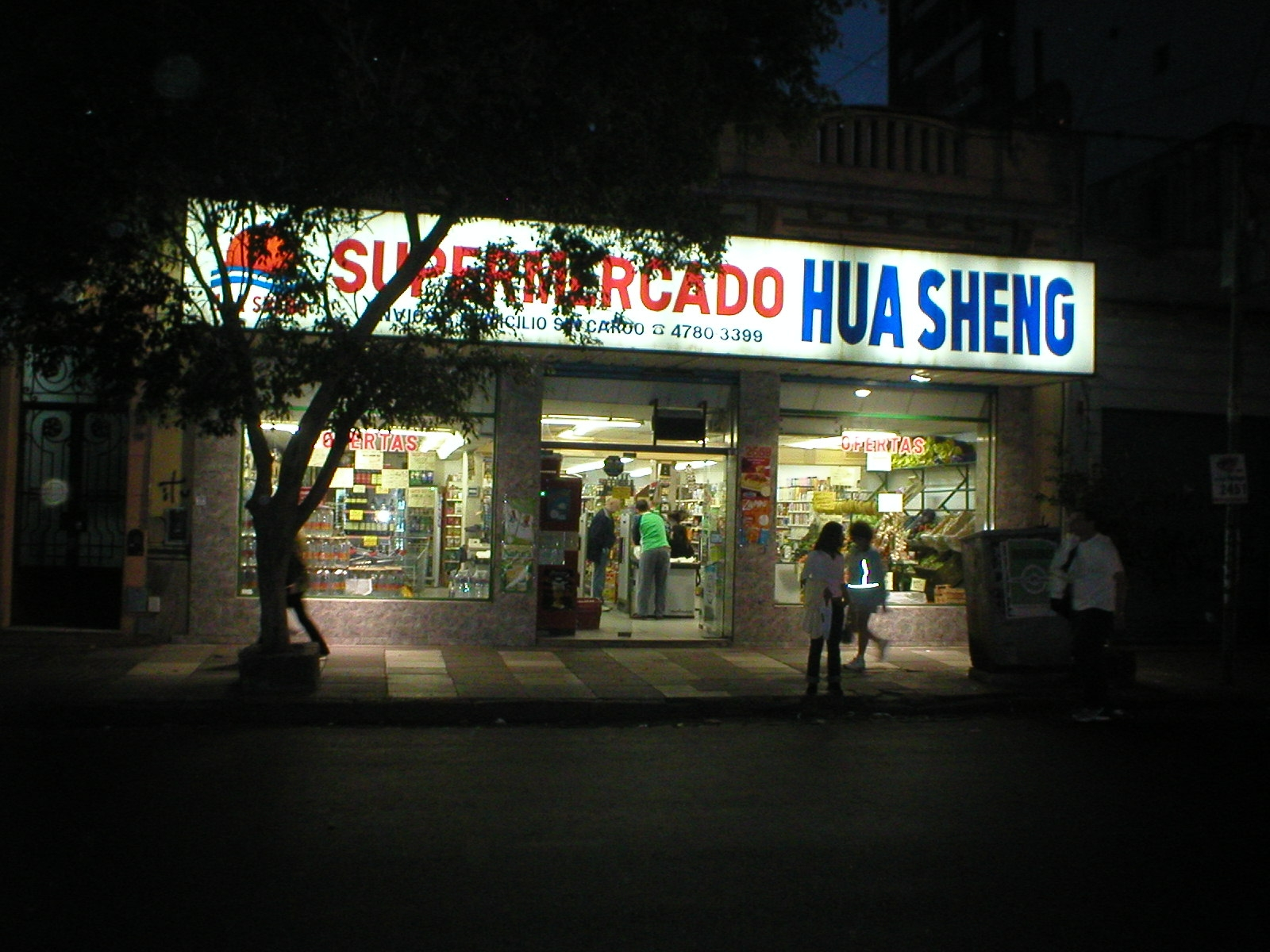
A small neighborhood grocery store in Buenos Aires owned by Asian Argentines.

Today, there are over 1 million Asian Argentines, the largest number being of Lebanese and Syrian descent, who total at around 3.5 million. The Lebanese alone are estimated to be about 1.5 million, Those of Chinese descent are next, with around 120,000 of as of 2010, 65,000 of Japanese descent as of 2021, and more than 23,000 of Korean descent as of 2022.

There are an estimated 1 million Arabic-speakers in Argentina, the most in Latin America.

Other Asian Argentines include smaller clusters of ethnic Laotians, Thai, Cambodian, Vietnamese and Hmong, most of whom arrived in the aftermath of conflict in Southeast Asia in the 1970s. They run restaurants, small groceries and vending stands or are involved in agricultural work. After arriving in Argentina, the Lao community settled in Misiones, where the Argentine government provided land and the UN provided $10,000 in financial assistance to each family. In 1997, a Lao temple, Wat Rattanarangsiyaram, was constructed in Posadas.

== Discrimination ==
Historically, immigrants from the Levant region of Western Asia, particularly the Lebanese and Syrians, have faced some discrimination. In 1910, Senator Manuel Lainez presented a project to expel Lebanese and Syrian immigrants regardless of their religious background (Christian, Jewish, etc.), but it was stopped by Joaquín V. González, who argued that they were the most "European" in Asia and hard-working. However, some discrimination continued.

Presently, the reputation of the East Asian community in the country has been jeopardized by allegations of corrupt business practices. Investigations within Korean Argentine textile factories and stores have shown that illegal workers from Bolivia were employed in those places. Because of this, many Korean-Argentines feel that their community has been unfairly targeted due to their economic success.

Another incident occurred in June 2006, when the union of truck drivers began a boycott of Chinese-owned stores after an alleged gun-related incident between a driver and a store owner, which involved illegal firearms. Shortages in stores were reported because of a lack of deliveries until the boycott was officially lifted the following month.

== Notable people ==
- Juliana Awada, former First Lady of Argentina; Lebanese Argentine
- Chanty, (born Maria Chantal Videla), actress and member of the South Korean girl group, Lapillus; Filipino Argentine
- Carlos Balá, actor of Lebanese descent
- Carlos Menem, lawyer and politician, former president of Argentina, Syrian Argentine
- Mario Alberto Ishii, politician; Japanese Argentine
- María Kodama, writer with Japanese father
- Chang Sung Kim, Korean Argentine actor
- Leonardo Nam, Korean Argentine actor
- Annabel, singer
- Liu Song, tennis player; Chinese Argentine
- Jessica Michibata Japanese model
- María Eugenia Suárez, actress with a Japanese grandmother

== See also ==
- East Asian Argentines
  - Chinese Argentines & Overseas Chinese
  - Japanese Argentines & Japanese diaspora
  - Koreans in Argentina & Korean diaspora
  - Laotian diaspora
- White Argentines
  - Arab Argentines
  - Lebanese Argentines & Lebanese diaspora
  - Syrian Argentines & Syrian diaspora
  - Armenian Argentines & Armenian diaspora
  - Turkish Argentines & Turkish diaspora
- Indian Argentines & Indian diaspora
