= Chinese Argentines =

阿根廷華人/华人 (Chinese) Sino-argentinos (Spanish)
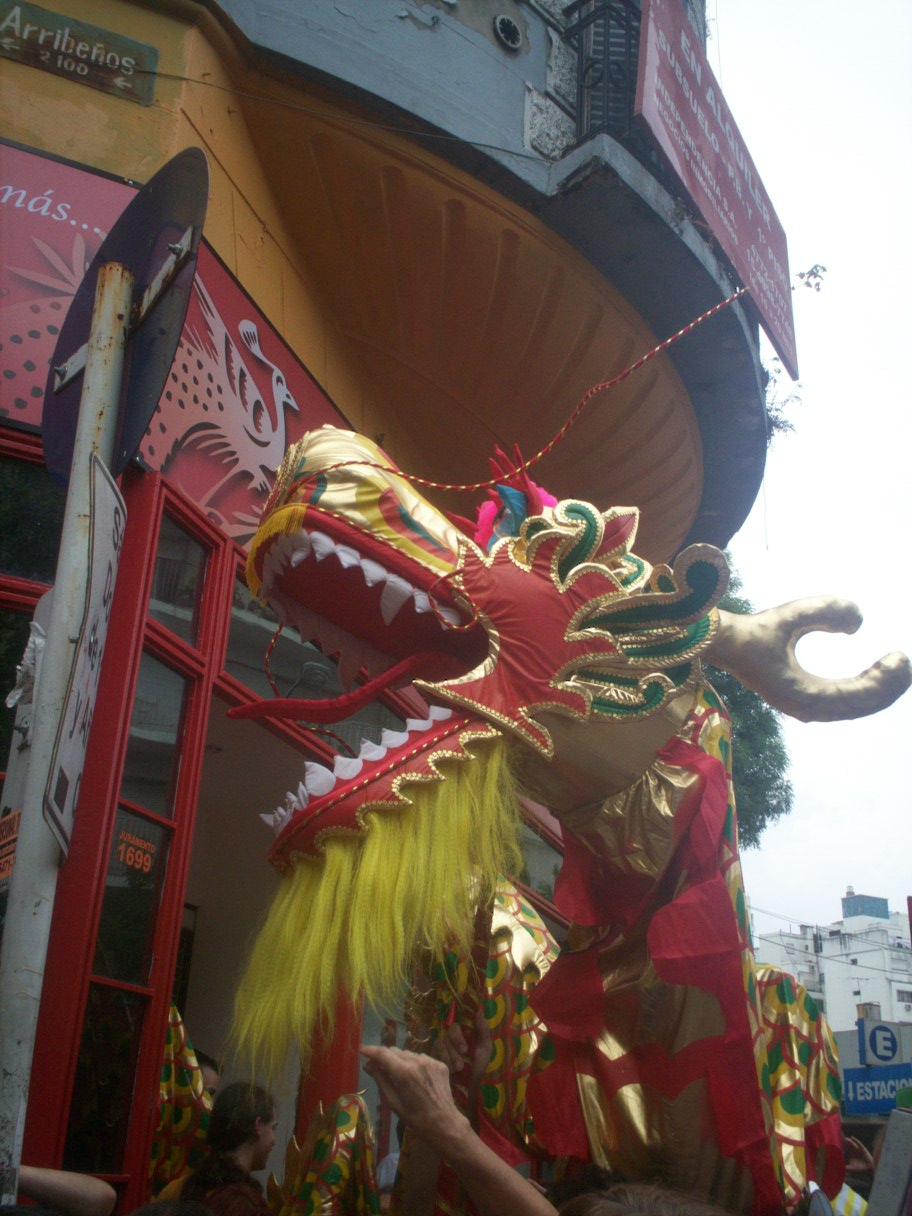
- Chinese New Year celebration in Buenos Aires' Chinatown

Total population
- 52,341 (by birth, 2023) + 350,000 (by ancestry, 2023); 0.45% of the Argentine population

Regions with significant populations
- Buenos Aires

Languages
- Spanish · Mandarin · Cantonese · Min · Hakka

Religion
- Catholicism · Chinese folk

Related ethnic groups
- Han Chinese · Cantonese · Hakka · Chinese Brazilians · Chinese Uruguayans

Chinese Argentines are Argentine citizens of Chinese ancestry or Chinese-born immigrants. The Chinese Argentine community is one of the fastest-growing communities in Argentina. As of 2023, the community was made up of 350,000 people.

== History ==
Since the 20th century, the Chinese in Argentina came in three waves. The first wave of immigrants came from small coastal towns between 1914 and 1949. The second wave of immigrants arrived from Taiwan in the 1980s, and over the years they have become accustomed to the porteño lifestyle. A considerable number of people from Hong Kong and the southern coastal region of China immigrated during the second wave. The third wave came in the period of years between 1970-1990, hailing mostly from mainland China, mostly from the coastal province of Fujian, consisting of families with income to open businesses on their arrival. This group consisted also of young drifters who came often through the illegal smuggling route originating in China's Fujian Province. However, many of the small supermarkets that are present in many neighbourhoods of Buenos Aires come from the community present during this third wave of immigration.

Recently there has been a fourth and newer wave of Chinese immigration who are mostly ambitious and educated members of China's growing middle-class. Young employees of Chinese companies are arriving to work for at least a two year period. Today, many Chinese Argentines usually run supermercados chinos (Chinese supermarkets), which dominate the second tier of grocery stores in Buenos Aires.

== Buenos Aires' Chinatown ==
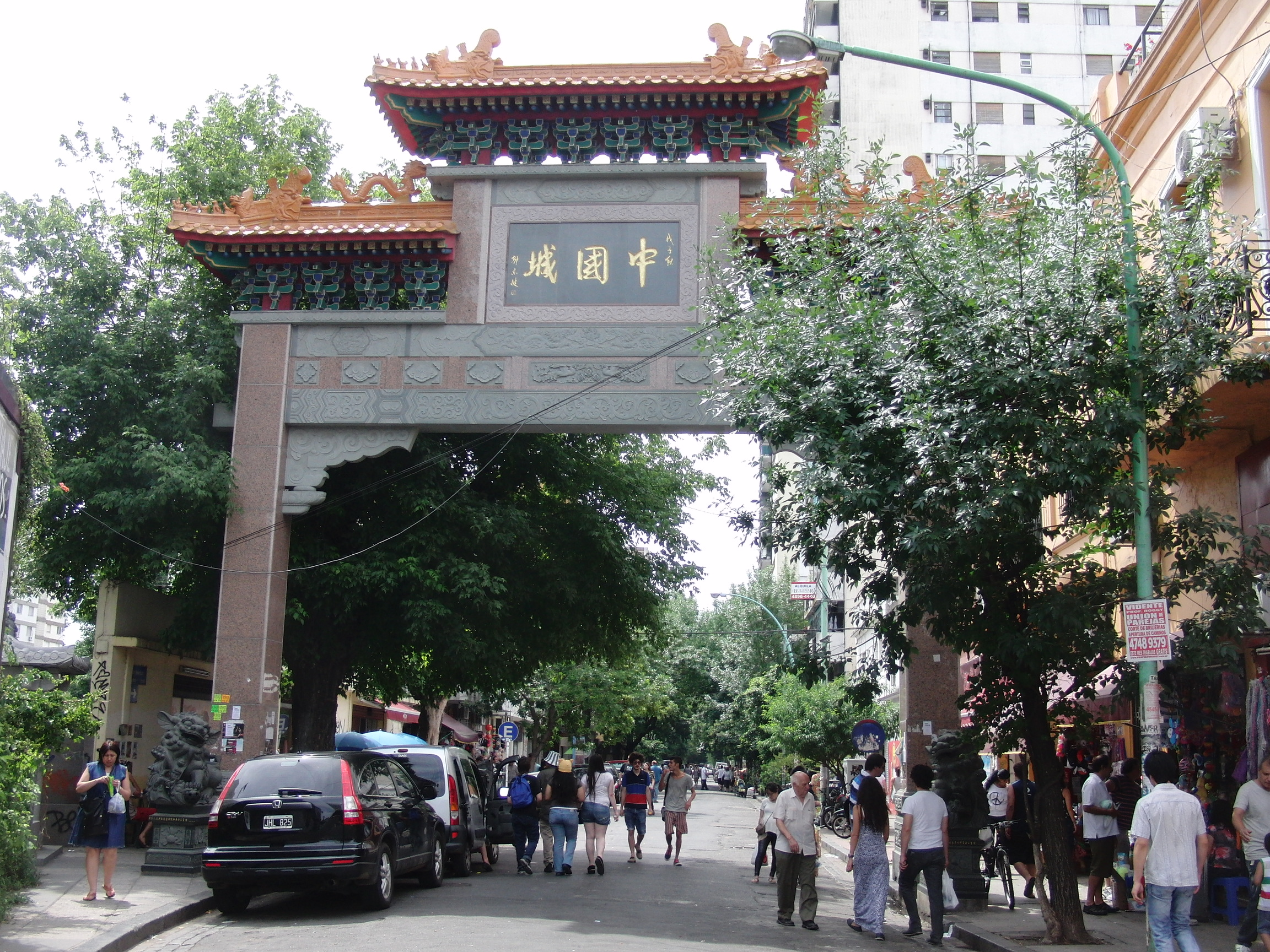
Entrance to Chinatown, Buenos Aires

Buenos Aires' Chinatown is a largely commercial section five blocks long and two blocks wide in the barrio of Belgrano, Buenos Aires. This neighborhood contains several Chinese restaurants, grocery stores, and a Buddhist temple. It is the heart of the Chinese community in Argentina. The neighborhood began to develop in the 1980s when newly arrived Taiwanese and Chinese immigrants settled in this area. The neighborhood is also known for its Chinese New Year celebrations.

== Religion ==
Tzong Kuan Temple was founded in 1988 by Master Pu Hsien with the support of Buddhist community in Taiwan. The temple is located in the Belgrano area on Montañeses 2175 Street and has a congregation of five hundred members. The current abbot is Master Zhi Han, and the temple is also affiliated with the Chinese Buddhist Association in Argentina and Bodhiyana Foundation.

Fo Guang Shan Order from Taiwan also has a branch temple, "Templo Budista Fo Guang Shan," in Argentina since 1992, and the temple offers courses in meditation, martial arts, and yoga and hosts vegetarian cooking workshops on a regular basis.

== Notable Chinese-Argentines ==
- Liu Song, table tennis player. Pan American Gold Medalist.
- Ignacio Huang, film actor.
- Fernando Juan Yuan Ping, businessman, entrepreneur, politician.

== See also ==
- Argentina–China relations
- Argentina–Taiwan relations
- Asian Argentines
- Overseas Chinese
