= Syrian Argentines =

Argentine citizens of Syrian descent

Sirio-argentinos أرجنتينيون سوريون
- (Argentina) (Syria)
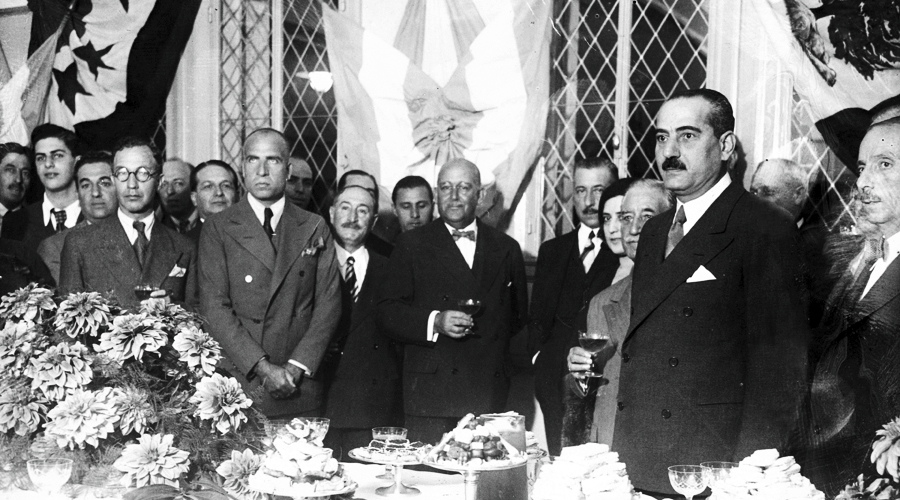
- President Agustín P. Justo at the inauguration of the Syrian-Lebanese School in Argentina

Total population
- 1,324 (by birth, 2022) + 2,000,000 (by ancestry, 2014); 3% of Argentina's population

Regions with significant populations
- Mainly in Greater Buenos Aires, Córdoba and the Argentine Northwest

Languages
- Majority: Spanish; Minority: Arabic (Shami)

Religion
- Mostly Christianity (mainly Eastern Orthodoxy), significant percentage of Muslims; Minority Judaism

Related ethnic groups
- Syrians and other Arab Argentines; Syrian Uruguayans · Syrian Brazilians · Syrian Americans · Syrian Colombians

Syrian Argentines are Argentine citizens of Syrian descent or Syrian-born people who reside in Argentina, mainly Arab Christians. Argentina has the second highest number of Syrians in South America after Brazil. Syrian immigration to Argentina has been and is currently, one of the most important Arab migration flows into the country. Immigration waves peaked in the 20th century, although in recent years due to the constant wars in the Middle East, emigration from Syria has been increasing over time. Like other Arab Argentines, they are universally known as "turcos" ("Turks"), like in the rest of Latin American countries.

In October 2014, because of the war raging in Syria and increased violence and persecution of civilians, the Argentine government announced that it would begin to receive Syrian refugees in its country, being the second South American country to do this after Uruguay.

== History ==
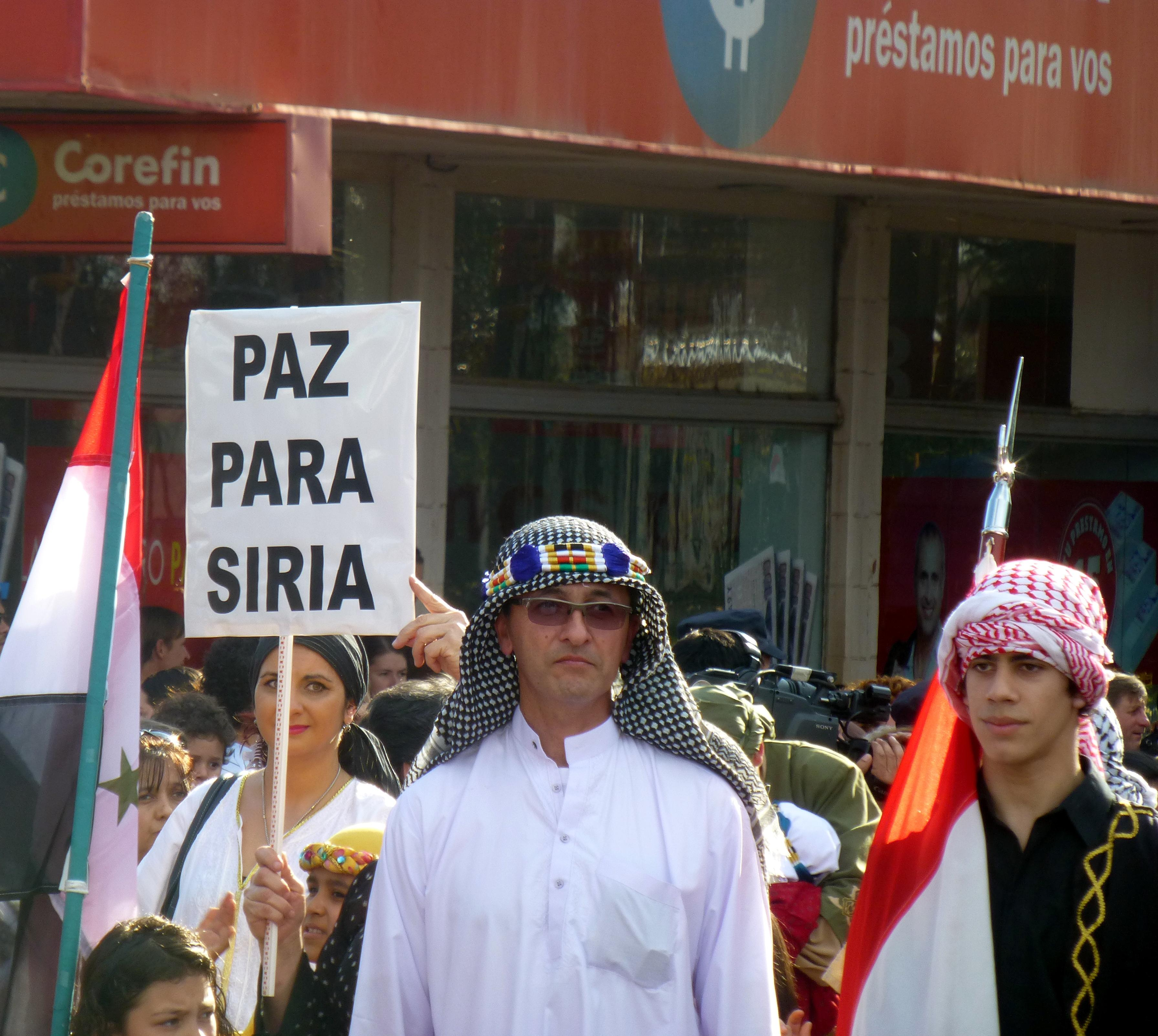
"Paz para Siria" (Peace for Syria, in Spanish), the message of the Arab Argentine community during the opening parade of the XXXIV National Immigrant Festival in Oberá, Misiones.

Most Syrians emigrating to Argentina established themselves in the northwest of the country, as did the Lebanese people. The Syrians, like the Lebanese, were mostly hawkers and did not practice agriculture. Thus, they did not settle in agricultural colonies but stayed in the cities in greater numbers than other immigrants. Sarmiento and Alberdi's plan to populate regions emptied of indigenous peoples did not materialize, as most of the newcomers chose cities. In the period from 1975 to 1977, their numbers decreased again. The first destination of these groups of Syrian and Lebanese was the province of Buenos Aires and from there many migrated further into the country, attracted by landscapes that resembled much of their native land. Many of these people settled in Córdoba, Salta, Jujuy, La Rioja, San Juan, Mendoza, Santiago del Estero, Misiones, Chaco and Patagonia. In these provinces, they were devoted primarily to agricultural work.

In recent years, the number of Syrians in the country has risen as a result of the Syrian civil war. In September 2013, the Argentinian government decided to offer refuge to thousands of Syrian refugees; by the previous month, more than 300 had arrived in the country. The following year, the Argentinian government launched the "Syria Program" to help the facilitate the arrival of refugees, being the second country to adopt such programs after Uruguay.

== Notable people ==
=== Politicians ===
- Carlos Menem (1930–2021), former President of Argentina
- Vicente Saadi (1913–1988), national senator and governor of Catamarca Province
- Carlos Fayt (1918–2016), member of the Supreme Court of Justice of Argentina
- Fernando Nadra (1916–1997), Argentine lawyer, journalist and public speaker. His son Alberto Nadra is also a politician.
- Luis Juez (born 1963), politician who served as Mayor of the City of Córdoba and later elected to the Senate.
- Claudia Ledesma Abdala (born 1974), national senator and former governor of Santiago del Estero Province
- Carlos Maslatón (born 1958), Argentine politician and financial analyst
- Rossana Chahla (born 1966), Mayor of San Miguel de Tucumán

=== Business ===
- Jorge Antonio (1917–2007), businessman and close adviser of Juan Domingo Perón.
- Lorenzo Miguel (1927–2002), labor leader.
- Alan Faena (born 1963), hotelier and real estate developer.
- Juliana Awada (born 1974), businesswoman and First Lady of Argentina, married to president Mauricio Macri.

=== Arts and sciences ===
- Jorge Sahade (1915–2012), astronomer and former president of the International Astronomical Union.
- Ana Amado, Journalist and academic who is one of the founders of the field of gender studies in Argentine.
- Eduardo Falú (1923–2013), folk music guitarist and composer.
- Juan José Saer (1937–2005), writer.
- Jorge Cafrune (1937–1978), folklore singer and musician.
- Leonardo Favio (1938–2012), singer, actor, film director and screenwriter.
- Leila Guerriero (born 1967), journalist and writer.

=== Sports ===
- Carolina Duer (born 1978), boxer
- Ezequiel Ham (born 1994), professional footballer
- Jalil Elías (born 1996), professional footballer.

== See also ==
- Immigration to Argentina
- Arab Argentines
- Asian Argentines
- Syrians in Uruguay
