= Brazil–Syria relations =

Bilateral relations

- Brazil: Syria

Diplomatic mission
- Brazilian Embassy, Damascus: Syrian Embassy, Brasília (Note: Also responsible for Syrian interests in Guyana and Suriname)

Envoy
- Ambassador André Santos: Ambbassador Rania al-Haj Ali

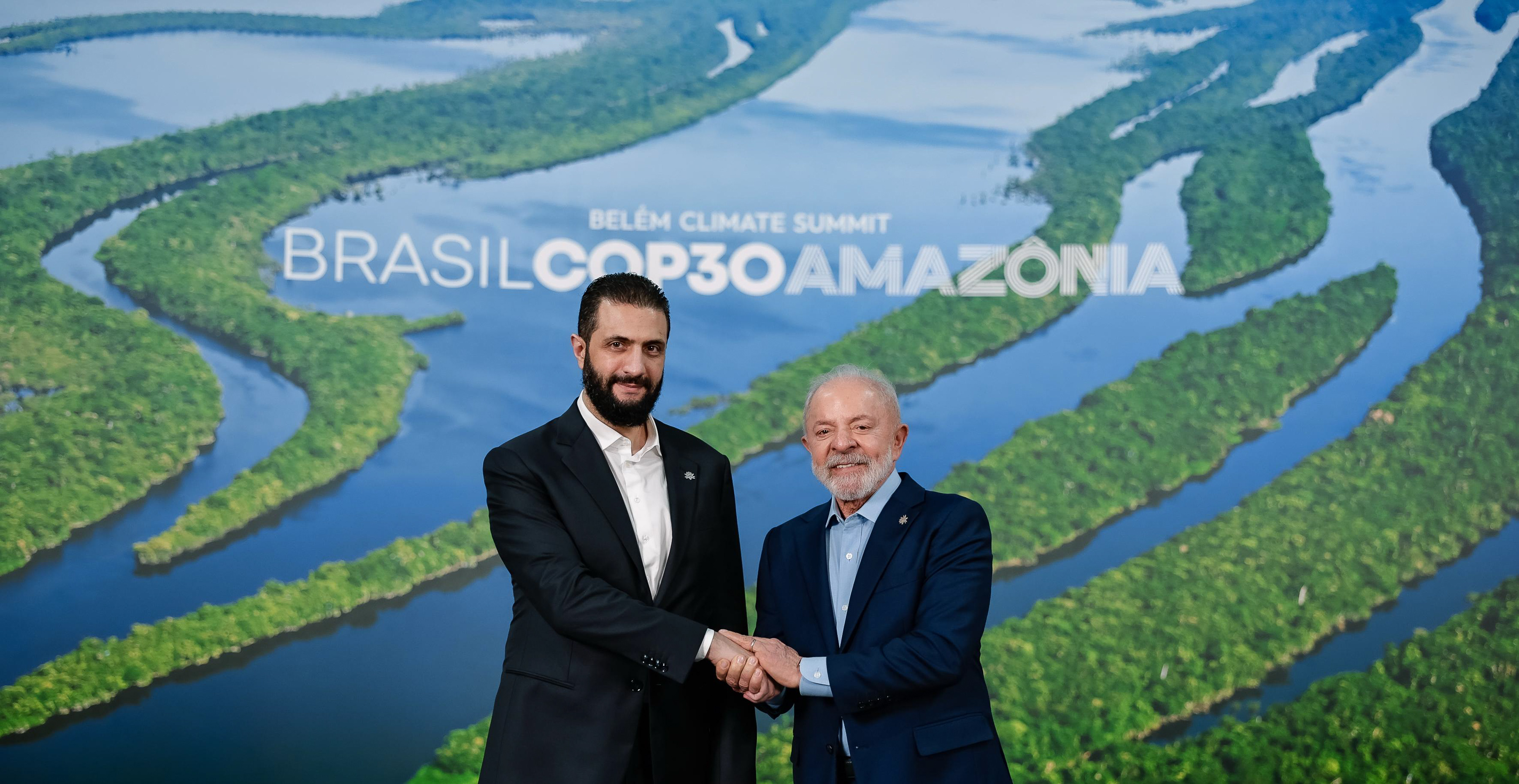
Syrian President Ahmed al-Sharaa and Brazilian President Luiz Inácio Lula da Silva during the COP30 summit, 6 November 2025

Brazil–Syria relations were established on 13 November 1945. Syria has an embassy in Brasília and a consulate-general in São Paulo. Brazil has an embassy in Damascus. Brazil and Syria have historical ties due to a significant Syrian population in Brazil, which is estimated to be around 4 million.

== History ==
Brazil and Syria established diplomatic relations in 1945, following the end of World War II and Syria's independence from France. The relationship has been marked by cultural exchanges, migration, and periods of economic cooperation. Due to political conflicts in Syria in recent decades, Brazil has been a destination for Syrian refugees.

=== Migration and cultural ties ===
Brazil has one of the largest Syrian-origin communities outside of Syria. The first wave of Syrian migration to Brazil occurred in the late 19th and early 20th centuries, during the days of the Ottoman Empire. The community is well-integrated, contributing to Brazilian culture, economy, and politics.

With the outbreak of the Syrian Civil War in 2011, many Syrians sought refuge in Brazil, making it one of the largest destinations for Syrians in South America. The Syrian community in Brazil has fostered strong cultural ties between the two nations, including the establishment of cultural centers and associations.

== Diplomatic relations ==
Syria has an Embassy in Brasília and a counsulate-general in São Paulo. As well as honorary consulates in Belo Horizonte, Curitiba, Campo Grande, and Anápolis.

The Legation of Brazil in Damascus was opened in 1951 and elevated to Embassy status in 1961. Brazil's embassy in Damascus remains open.

Brazil has played a diplomatic role in calling for peaceful resolutions in Syria, advocating for dialogue within the United Nations and other international organizations.

=== Chronology of bilateral relations, agreements, and visits ===
Order:

1876:

- Emperor Pedro II visits Syria, then part of the Ottoman Empire.

1945:

- Establishment of diplomatic relations.

1951:

- Brazil opens a Legation in Damascus.

1961:

- Establishment of the Brazilian Embassy in Damascus

1997:

- Signing of the Cultural and Educational Cooperation Agreement

2003

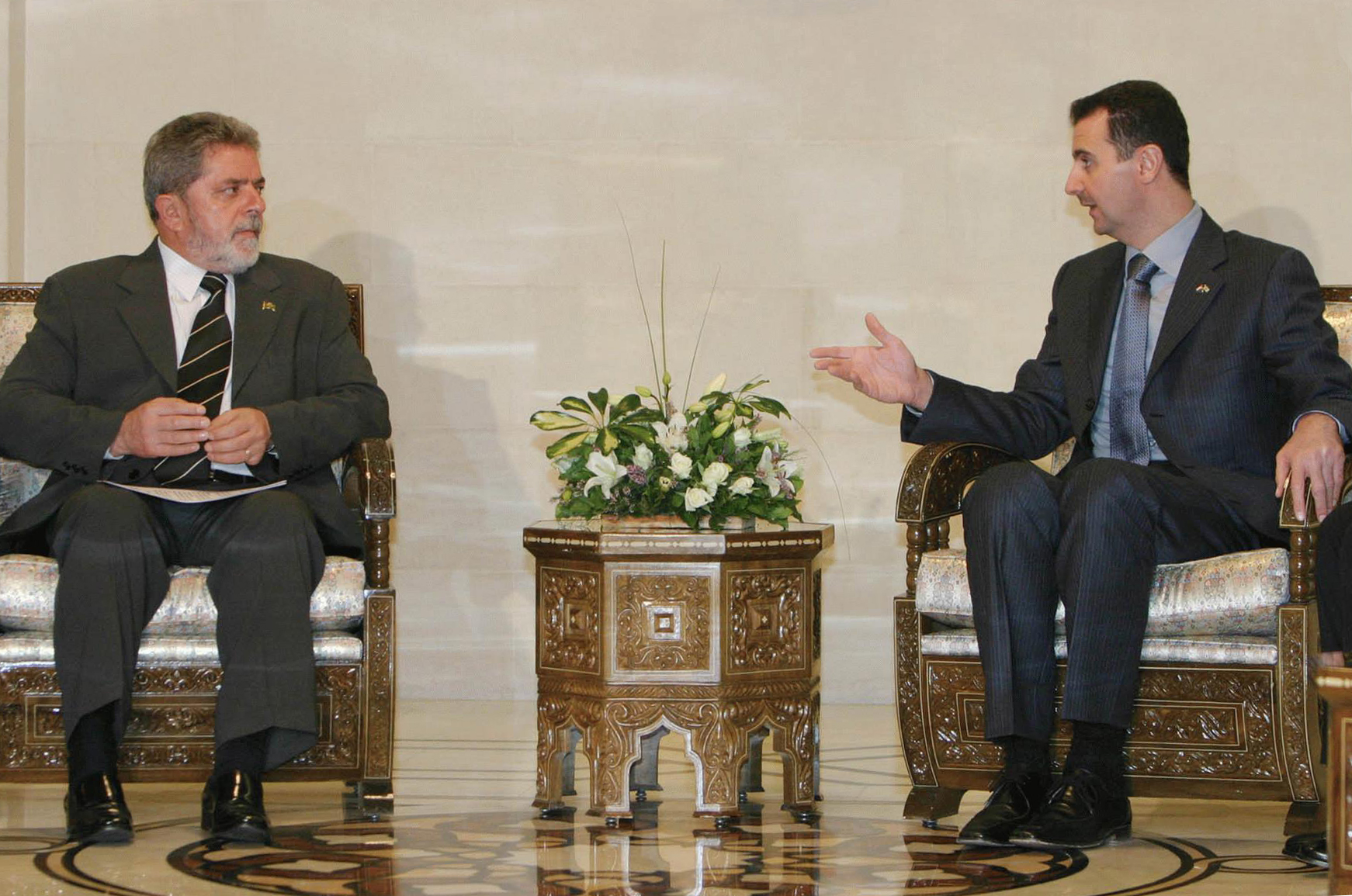
Lula da Silva and Bashar al-Assad during 2003 visit.

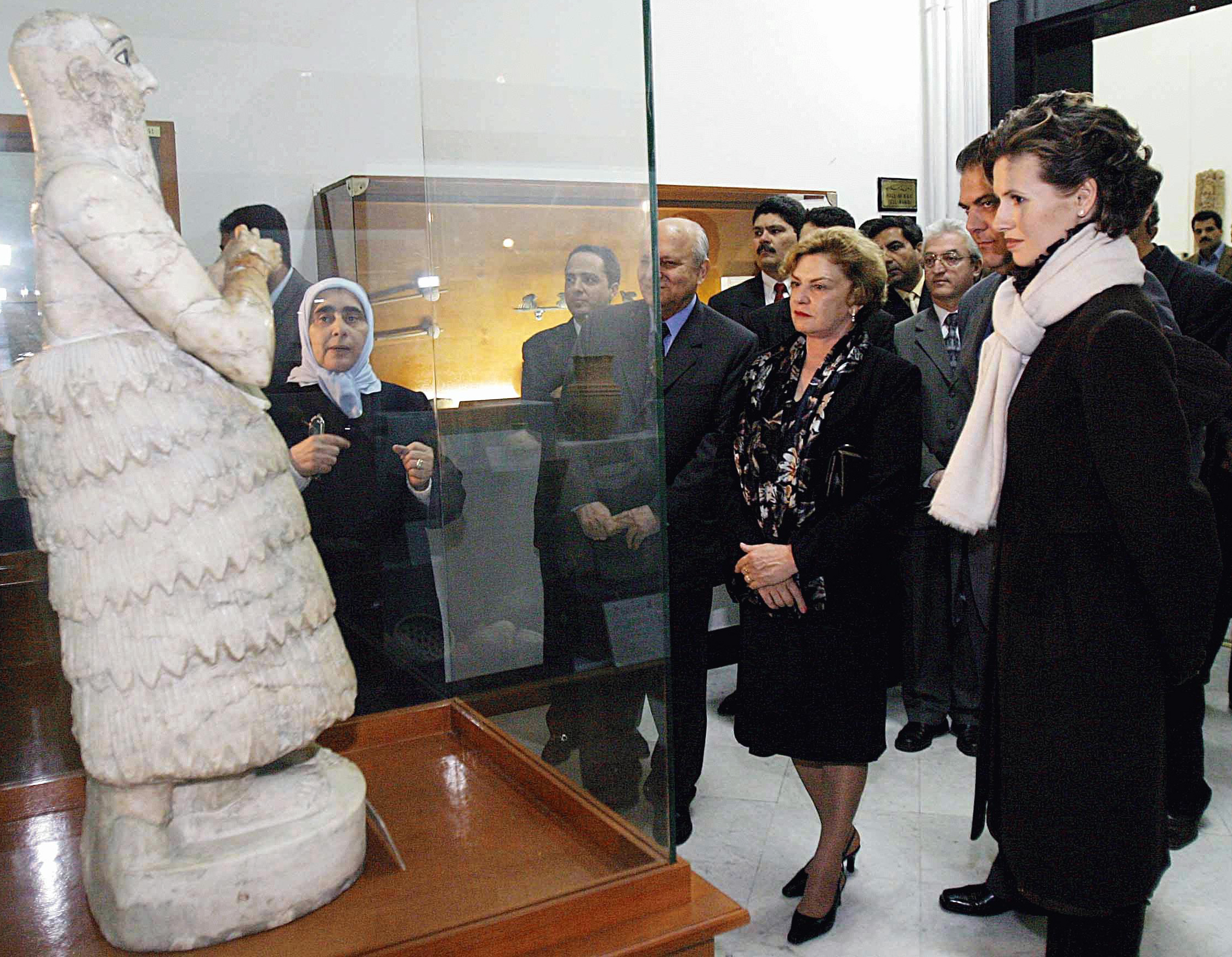
Brazilian First Lady Marisa Letícia Lula da Silva with Syrian First Lady Asma al-Assad during 2003 visit.

- President Luiz Inácio Lula da Silva visits Syria.
- Signing of the Sports Cooperation Agreement.

2005:

- Foreign Minister Celso Amorim visits Damascus.
- Syrian Prime Minister Muhammad Naji al-Otari visits Brasília.
- The Minister of Economy of Syria, Amer Lutfi, visits Brazil.

2006:

- Minister of Education Fernando Haddad visits Damascus.
- Syrian Minister of the Environment Hilal al-Atrash visits Brazil.
- The Brazilian Chief Minister of the Institutional Security Office of the Presidency of the Republic, General Jorge Armando Felix, visits Syria.

2007:

- The Syrian Minister of Information, Muhsen Bilal, visits Brazil.

2008:

- Brazilian Foreign Minister Celso Amorim visits Damascus.

2009:

- Brazilian Foreign Minister Celso Amorim visits Damascus.

2010:

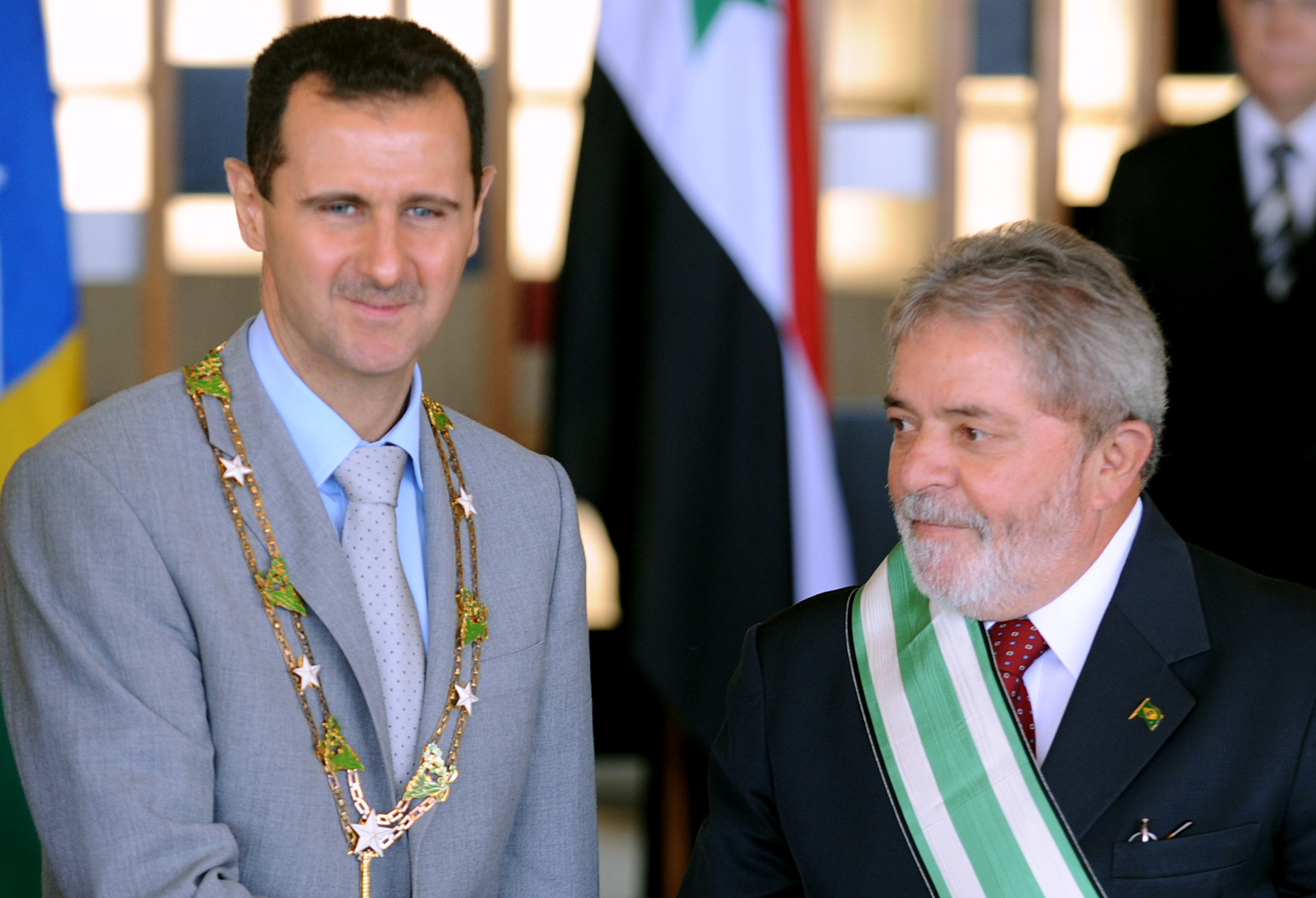
Brazilian President Lula with Syrian President Assad who received the Order of the Southern Cross, highest Order of Merit in 2010.

- Syrian President Bashar al-Assad visits Brasília.
- Brazilian Foreign Minister Celso Amorim visits Damascus.

2011:

- IBSA mission to Damascus

2012:

- The Political and Press Advisor to the President of Syria Bouthaina Shaaban, visits Brazil.

2018:

- A Delegation of Brazilian federal deputies visits Syria.
- Brazilian Senator Fernando Collor de Mello, President of the Foreign Relations and National Defense Committee of the Federal Senate, visits Syria.

== Economic relations ==
Trade between Brazil and Syria has fluctuated, especially during the Syrian Civil War. Brazil exports products such as sugar, coffee, and poultry to Syria, while importing some Syrian products, mainly in textiles and handicrafts.

In recent years, trade has decreased due to the ongoing conflict in Syria. However, efforts have been made by both nations to revitalize economic relations through diplomatic dialogues and potential trade agreements.

== Syrian refugees in Brazil ==
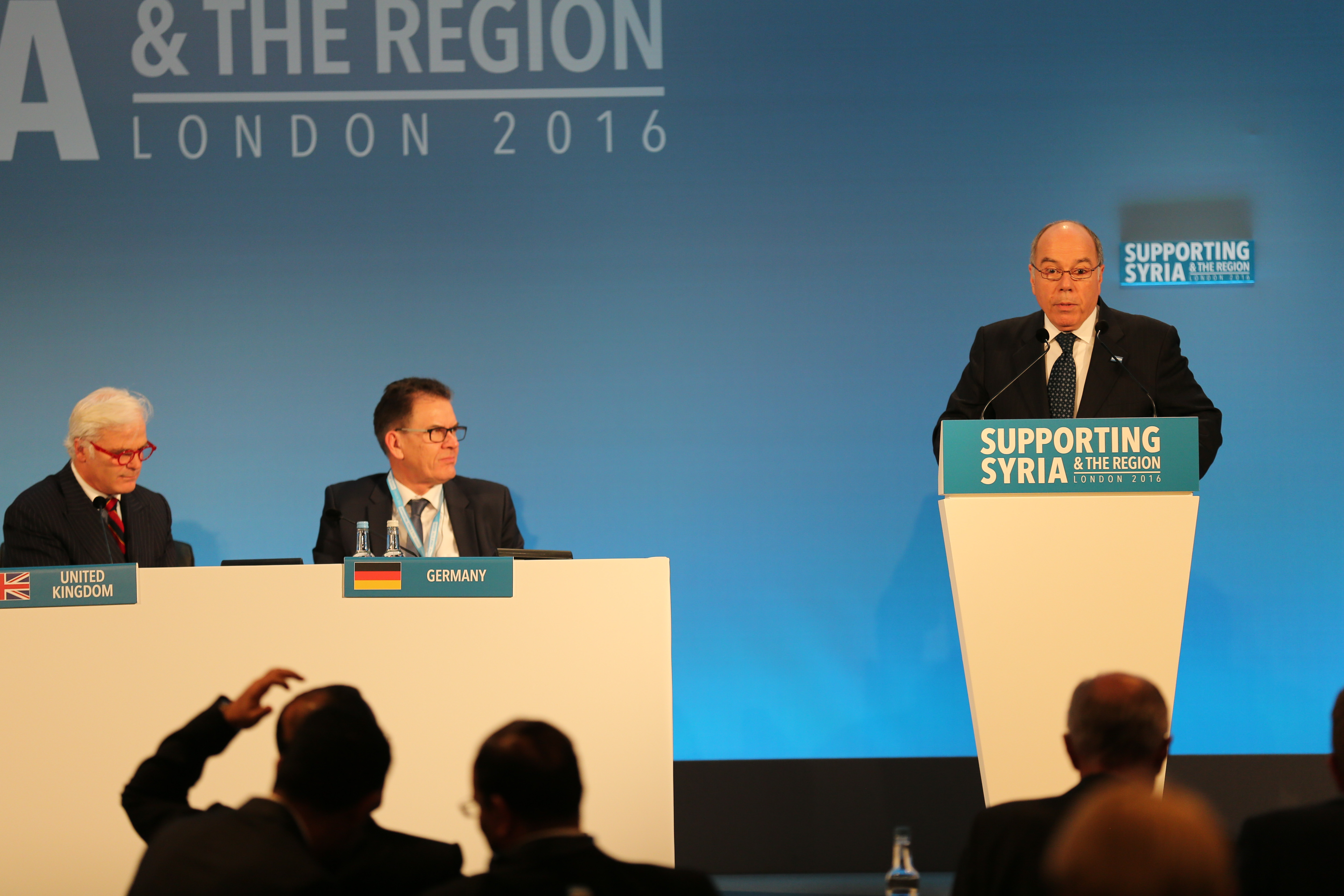
Brazilian Foreign Minister Mauro Vieira at the Supporting Syria conference, 2016.

Brazil has provided asylum to Syrian refugees since the beginning of the Syrian Civil War. The Brazilian government issued humanitarian visas to Syrians, allowing them to apply for asylum upon arrival. Various non-governmental organizations and local Syrian community groups in Brazil have provided support to Syrian refugees through social services, language classes, and employment assistance.

== International stances ==
Brazil has taken a relatively neutral stance on the Syrian conflict, calling for a peaceful resolution without military intervention. Brazil has supported international humanitarian efforts and expressed support for Syrian refugees both within Brazil and globally. Brazil has also opposed unilateral military interventions in Syria, advocating for solutions based on dialogue.

== See also ==
- Foreign relations of Brazil
- Foreign relations of Syria
- Syrian diaspora
  - Syrian Argentines
  - Syrian Brazilians
  - Syrian Uruguayans
  - Syrian Venezuelans
