= John William Cooke =

Argentine lawyer and politician (1919–1968)

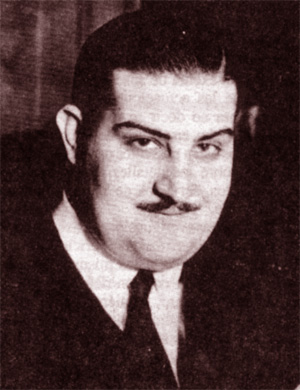
- Cooke in 1958

National Deputy
- In office 4 June 1946 – 4 June 1952
- Constituency: Federal Capital

Personal details
- Born: 14 November 1919 La Plata, Argentina
- Died: 19 September 1968 (aged 48) Buenos Aires, Argentina
- Party: Justicialist Party
- Education: National University of La Plata

John William Cooke (14 November 1919 – 19 September 1968) was an Argentine lawyer and politician. An early follower of President Juan Perón, Cooke went on to form part and lead the revolutionary leftist wing of the Peronist movement. Following the 1955 coup d'état, an exiled Perón appointed Cooke as his proxy in Argentina.

From 1955 to his death from lung cancer in 1968, Cooke was a militant leader of the Peronist resistance against proscription by the dictatorial régimes of the Revolución Libertadora and the Revolución Argentina. His writings on the revolutionary potential of Peronism and his role in the Peronist resistance have led to him becoming the most recognizable face of left-wing Peronism.

== Early life and career ==
Cooke was born on 14 November 1919 in La Plata to a political family of Irish Argentine background. His father, Juan Isaac Cooke, was a prominent politician of the Radical Civic Union who served as foreign minister during the presidency of Edelmiro Farrell, who rose to power in the 1943 coup d'état.

Cooke studied law at the National University of La Plata, graduating in 1943. He later worked as a secretary for his father, which served as his entry into politics. He ran for a seat in the Argentine Chamber of Deputies in the 1946 general election for Buenos Aires, as part of the coalition backing General Juan Perón's ticket to the presidency. Elected to Congress aged 25, he became the youngest member of the new legislature, leading him to be nicknamed "Bebé Cooke". As a member of the Chamber of Deputies, Cooke presided the commission on constitutional affairs.

== Leader of the Peronist left ==
Early on, Cooke became convinced Peronism had the potential to become a revolutionary movement. He became known for his criticism of the "union bureaucracy" (burocracia sindical), the strong arm of right-wing "Orthodox Peronism", which had grown considerably from 1946 to 1952.

In 1951, Cooke was selected by Juan Perón and his wife, Eva Perón, to defend the government's closure of the opposition newspaper La Prensa. Cooke's impassioned speech at the Chamber of Deputies labeled the newspaper of having "gone against [our] nationality", and acting as an "obstacle against all proletarian demands in Latin America". The anti-imperialist tone of the speech led right-wing peronist congressman Raúl Apold to label Cooke a communist.

The 1955 coup d'état overthrew Perón and installed a dictatorship that banned Peronism and persecuted anyone associated with the movement. The day after the coup, Cooke was arrested by state security forces at the house of his friend, José María Rosa. Despite his imprisonment, Cooke continued to organise the remnants of the Peronist movement as the "Peronist resistance". From his exile in Caracas, in 1956 Perón appointed Cooke as his representative in Argentina and proxy leader of the movement as a whole.

In March 1957, Cooke escaped from his prison in Río Gallegos alongside other Peronist political prisoners (including Jorge Antonio, Héctor José Cámpora, and José Espejo) and fled to Chile. He would later go to Cuba to join revolutionary efforts in the island, participating in active combat at the Bay of Pigs Invasion on 17 April 1961 alongside his wife, professor and essayist Alicia Eguren.

=== Writings ===
Cooke is known for his writings on the revolutionary potential of Peronism. Among his best-known works is Apuntes para la militancia, published in 1964, in which he analyses the complex situation of Peronism in the aftermath of the 1955 coup d'état, identifying the movement's main adversaries, and the basic strategies laid out by the Peronist resistance. In it, Cooke calls Peronism "the cursed fact of the bourgeois nation" (Spanish: el hecho maldito del país burgués). Cooke's writings were deeply influenced by Marxism and historical materialism, as well as his own friendship with Ernesto "Che" Guevara. Throughout his works, Cooke's main concern was the need for Marxism and the revolutionary left of Argentina to merge into the Peronist movement, understanding it as the true entry way into the Argentine working class.

Cooke also worked as a professor of political economy at the University of Buenos Aires Faculty of Law and Social Sciences from 1946 to 1955.

== Death ==
John William Cooke died of lung cancer on 16 September 1968, aged 48, at the Hospital de Clínicas in Buenos Aires. The acting president at the time, General Juan Carlos Onganía, had allowed Cooke to return to Argentina despite the government's active policy of persecuting peronists due to Cooke's ailing health. He would not live to see Perón return from his exile and be elected for a third time in 1973. He was survived by his wife, Alicia Eguren, who would go on to be arrested, disappeared, and later killed by the dictatorship of the National Reorganization Process in 1977.

On 26 September 2014, Cooke's ashes were scattered at the Río de la Plata, as he had stated it was his will before his death. The scattering ceremony was attended by his friend, Carlos Lafforgue, and Eguren's son by her second marriage, Pedro Catella, as well as numerous Peronist politicians and sympathisers.
