= Alicia Eguren =

Argentine teacher, poet, essayist and journalist

Alicia Graciana Eguren
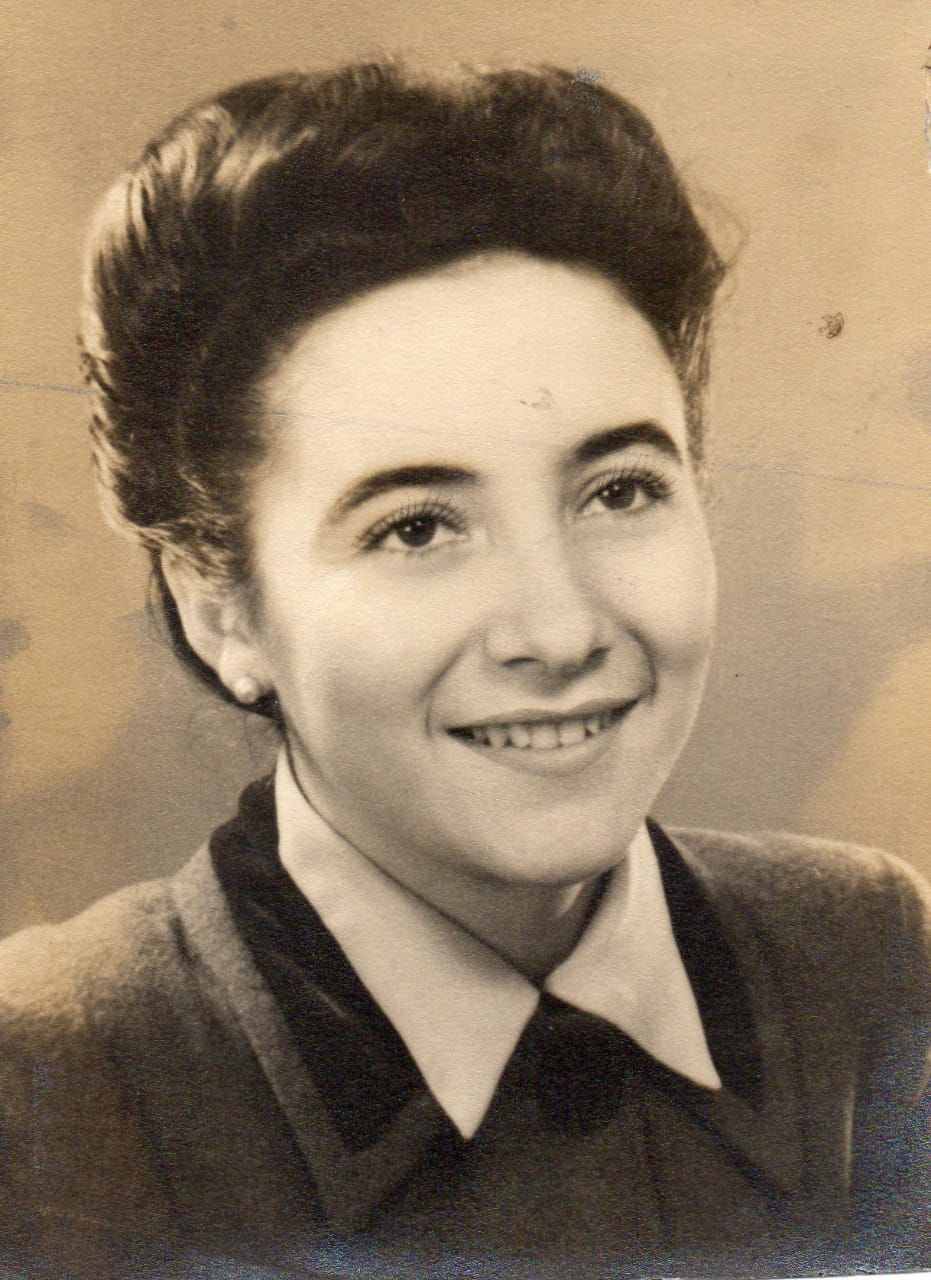
- Born: October 11, 1925; Buenos Aires
- Disappeared: January 27, 1977
- Status: Dead
- Died: September 19, 1977 (aged 51); Río de la Plata
- Cause of death: Victim of state assassination
- Education: Faculty of Philosophy and Letters, University of Buenos Aires
- Occupations: Revolutionary, Poet, Writer, Journalist, Professor
- Years active: 1946–1977
- Organization: Sexto Continete Newspaper
- Notable work: Dios y el mundo; El canto de la tierra inicial; Poemas del siglo XX; Aquí, entre magias y espigas; El talud descuajado.
- Political party: Peronism; Revolutionary Peronist Acction; Revolutionary Peronism; Anti-Imperialst Front for Socialism
- Other political affiliations: Cuban Revolutionary Armed Forces
- Spouse(s): Pedro Catella; John William Cooke
- Children: Pedro Gustavo Catella Eguren

Notes
- Lieutenant to Che Guevara

Alicia Graciana Eguren (Buenos Aires, 1924 - Buenos Aires, 26 January 1977) was an Argentine teacher, poet, essayist and journalist.

== Biography ==
Eguren graduated from the University of Buenos Aires as a teacher of literature. She worked as a teacher of literature both in Buenos Aires and Rosario, Santa Fe. She worked at the newspaper Con Todo and the magazine Nuevo Hombre. She also edited the cultural magazine Sexto Continente. In 1946, she met and later married the Peronist leader, John William Cooke in a study center. Between 1946 and 1951, she published five books of poetry, which had a tendency to Catholic idealism. In 1953, she joined the Ministry of Foreign Affairs and married the diplomat Pedro Catella, whom she accompanied to London.

== Selected works ==
- Dios y el mundo,
- El canto de la tierra inicial,
- Poemas del siglo XX,
- Aquí, entre magias y espigas,
- El talud descuajado.
