= El Malpensante =

Colombian literary magazine

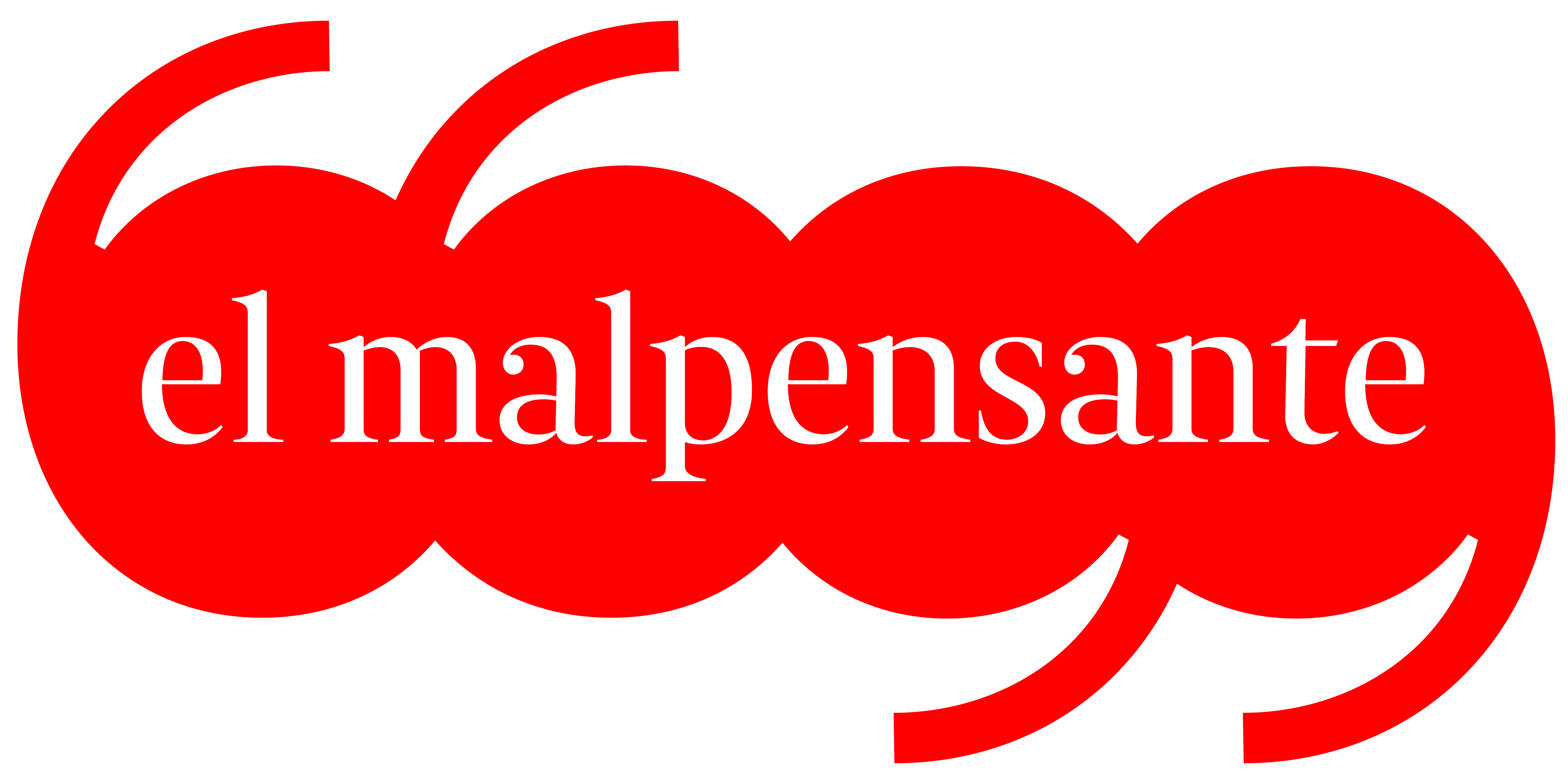
- Director: Andrés Hoyos
- Editor: Santiago Erazo
- Categories: Literary magazine
- Frequency: Monthly
- Founder: Andrés Hoyos Restrepo; Mario Jursich Durán
- First issue: 31 October 1996
- Company: Editorial El Malpensante, S.A.
- Country: Colombia
- Based in: Bogotá, D.C.
- Language: Spanish
- Website: www.elmalpensante.com
- ISSN: 0122-9273
- OCLC: 39475558

El Malpensante (Spanish: The Misthinker) is a Colombian literary magazine of reportage, commentary, criticism, essays, fiction, satire, short stories, graphic art and poetry founded in 1996. Its founders were Andrés Hoyos Restrepo and Mario Jursich Durán. The name of the magazine was taken from a book of aphorisms written by Gesualdo Bufalino.

Past contributors to the magazine include Mario Vargas Llosa, Germán Espinosa, Leila Guerriero, Juan Gabriel Vázquez, Margaret Atwood, Juan Villoro, and Samanta Schweblin.

== History and profile ==
Since its foundation in 1996, El Malpensante has become one of the main cultural references of Colombia in topics such as literature, cinema, music, art, architecture, design and politics. The wide variety of paradoxical readings contained in its pages have redefined for a generation of readers what it means to "be malpensante": a brand of literary pleasure, a window to access peculiar and profound views of culture, and a publishing firm.

For several years, the publishing house of the magazine carried out the "Festival Malpensante", which consisted on a series of yearly of encounters and cultural activities realized in Bogotá. However, the festival came to an end in 2011. Since 2003, the magazine collaborates with the Universidad Externado de Colombia in order to distribute to its subscribers the little volumes of the collection Un libro por centavos, destined to the divulgation of the lyrical work of several authors.

Since 2020, El Malpensante releases a special yearly issue under title "La Malpensante Moda". This series is the product of an alliance between Fundación Malpensante and Silla Verde, and it arises from the desire of exploring the meeting grounds between art and fashion. La Malpensante Moda counts on Rocio Arias Hofman as invited editor for every one of its issues. The latest deliveries of "La Malpensante Moda" have counted with the participation of Female artists and writers such as Margo Glantz, Sorayda Peguero, Vanessa Rosales and Goyo.

Since 2017, the director of the magazine is Andrés Hoyos. The current editor of El Malpensante is Santiago Erazo, while its art director is Federico Fonseca; both began their respective labours in 2021.
