= Alberto Nadra =

Argentine politician

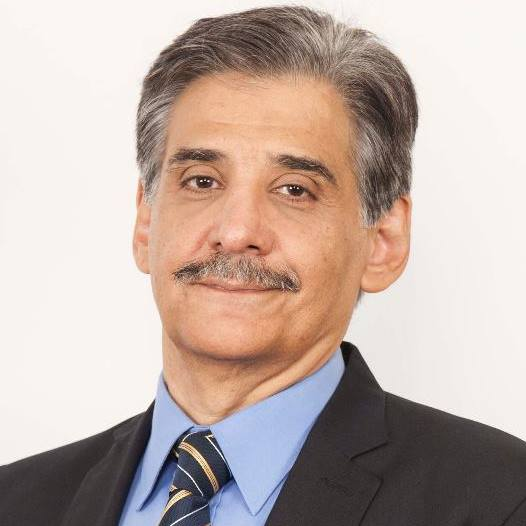
- Born: April 15, 1952 (age 74); Buenos Aires, Argentina
- Occupations: Journalist and writer
- Years active: 1970-present
- Notable work: Press agencies, newspapers, radio and television
- Spouse(s): María Leonor Canelles, from 1982
- Children: Yamille, Giselle
- Awards: 1979, Professional Merit Award from the Journalists International Organization; 2003 Héctor Oesterheld Award; 2015, Legislature of the City of Buenos Aires
- Website: albertonadra.com.ar

Alberto Emilio Nadra (Buenos Aires, Argentina, 15 April 1952) is an Argentine politician, writer and journalist of Marxist conviction. He stood out as a human rights activist and also in the constitution of the Argentine Youth Political Coordination (Coordinadora de Juventudes Políticas Argentinas) between 1970 and 1980.

== Childhood and youth ==
Nadra was born in Buenos Aires on April 12 of 1952, the youngest of the three children of Fernando Nadra and Zulma Beltramone. However, his family was able to sign him in the local civil registry on April 15, due to complications associated to political pursuits and his father's imprisonment. He made his elementary studies in different schools of Buenos Aires, sometimes with false identities and documents. This period of his life was determining for his posterior social and political commitment, and he has named it as "The lost childhood" ("La infancia extraviada") in his books Secrets in Red (Secretos en Rojo).

Nadra made his first year of high school in an institution situated in Haedo, Buenos Aires, but after completing the academic year, the authorities forced him to abandon the place due to his student activism. He finished his studies in the baccalaureate of National School Mariano Moreno and later he began to study Sociology and Law in the University of Buenos Aires (UBA), but he did not complete any of the two careers.

On March 26 of 1982 he married Leonor Canelles, the eldest daughter of the leader of the trade-union of construction, Jorge Canelles, one of the primary promoters of the popular rebellion called the Cordobazo, along with the Secretary of the Trade-union "Luz y Fuerza", Agustín Tosco.

== Student militancy ==
In 1965 he was chosen by his classmates as a student delegate in a high school of commercial orientation situated in Haedo, Buenos Aires. During that period he took part in a wall newspaper, in which the invasion that 42.000 American marines had made in Dominic Republic to prevent the reinstatement of the legitimate government of Juan Bosch was reported and condemned. As a result of the manifestation, the authorities expelled him from the school. After his classmates’ mobilization, Nadra was reincorporated, but the school directors imposed a disciplinary sanction and asked him to change of establishment the following year.

In 1966 Nadra entered to the Mariano Moreno National School, where he collaborated in the reorganization of the Student Center between 1966 and 1967, meanwhile the dictatorship of Juan Carlos Onganía prohibited any type of student activism. In 1968, Nadra was one of the delegates that promoted the first high school strike, against the imposition of curriculums considered by the students as anti-pedagogical and restrictive. In 1969 his school's Student Center repudiated the assassinations of students in popular manifestations in some Argentine provinces, like Corrientes, Rosario and Córdoba. The students began to use black badges in their jackets and dusts covers. This measure was generalized in several public establishments of the country.

During his years as a college student, Nadra was a member of the Delegate Council and the Student Center of the Faculty of Philosophy and Literature of the Buenos Aires University. He also participated in the occupation of establishments and in some confrontations with the local police and the Guard of Infantry, as a part of the national movement against the admission exams in 1970 and 1971. Many times, Nadra was imprisoned and illegally deprived of his freedom by the police and para-police groups.

== Political Militancy ==
Nadra began his political activity as a member of the Federación Juvenil Comunista. He was involved in its student's organisms and in its press union. In 1970 and 1982 he was elected to be a member of the Political Relations Commission and of the Central Committee of that organization. Nadra also directed the biweekly "Aquí y Ahora" during a period of the military dictatorship and until 1984, when he began to collaborate in the direction of the Communist Party of Argentina.

In this period he was part of the Editorial Council of the magazine Nueva Era and he directed the seminary Propuesta (with a distribution of 150,000 copies). He also participated in the redactions of the documents Tesis and Informe Central, the theoretical axes of the so-called "turn" process, in the XVI Congress of the organization, in November 1986. In spite of having been elected as member of the Central Committee in that ceremony, the denaturalization of the "turn" made more evident the differences between Nadra and the hegemonic sector of the Direction. As a result, he gave up the PC on October 8 of 1990, after 26 years of militancy activity.

In the first years of the decade of 1970, Nadra was one of the founders of Political Youth of Argentina and he collaborated in his reconstruction, between the military coup and 1982. That same year, the JPA were relaunched as Movement of Political Youth.

Generally omitted in the testimonial and academic works about the resistance to the National Reorganization Progress (Proceso de Reorganizacion Nacional), the action of the JPA –with the common efforts of young peronists, communists, radical, intransigent, Christian democrats and socialists, among others- motorized the reappearance of the juvenile action in the labor and student movement, the agricultural youth and the cultural spaces of actors, plastic artists and writers. Among his most important initiatives we can find the call for peace in the Beagle Conflict, the mobilization for the visit of de Inter-American Commission on Human Rights in 1979, the march of the Commission of the 25 and of the CGT Brazil to the San Cayetano church, and on March 30 of 1982, the Day of debate and mobilization in the surrounding area of Plaza de Mayo.

In parallel with his cooperation works with other political organizations, Nadra was involved in strong controversies. Many of them from his biweekly column "Temas de Debate" (Topics on Debate), in the newspaper Aquí y Ahora. In 1997, stands out his rough reply to the article of Juan Gelman in Página/12, although the newspaper published it partially. More recently, Nadra replied to the critics of Manuel Gaggero to the communists, in an article about the assault of the People's Revolutionary Army to the Monte Chingolo's headquarters.

In December 1997 he integrated the Confluence Forum, with a hundred of political, social and artistic personalities that claimed strong changes to the programmatic document "Carta a los Argentinos" (approved for the Alliance for Work, Justice and Education in 1998, as an electoral platform) y questioned the election of Fernando de la Rúa as a presidential candidate in 1999.

He was part of the UNITE party, and, as a part of his direction, he accorded with Néstor Kirchner a programmatical approach to support his candidature at the end of 2002, afterwards led by the Front for Victory.

Between 2004 and December 2015 he was delegated of Sedronar in the National Congress.

== Human Rights ==
Across his militancy in the JPA, Nadra was intimately committed with APDH, LADH, the relatives of missing and imprisoned by political reasons, the Grandmothers of the Plaza de Mayo and the Mothers of the Plaza de Mayo. In 1977 he participated, along with other youthful leaders to the first march of the Mothers of Plaza de Mayo and he was also one of the organizers of the youth seminars of the Permanent Assembly for Human Rights in 1979 and 1980.

Between September 6 and 20 of 1979, Nadra integrated the youthful delegation that made the speech in the Inter-American Commission on Human Rights, CIDH.

== Plan Cóndor ==
Recently it was revealed that Nadra was an important part of the network of counterintelligence and solidarity that saved lives, denounced atrocities and even promoted actions during the so-called Operation Condor. This plan of the dictatorships of the Latin American South Cone was based on the extermination of the left-wing movement and the revolutionary nationalism, with the logistic help and under the direction of the CIA. The network in which Nadra took part, connected the graphic and radio media from Moscow, Prague and Berlin, as well as others from Occidental Europe, with the activities that were being done inside the affected countries and had the logistic and intelligence support of the communist parties of the continent and the "Social Field", as it was called in that time. Other links in this informative and logistic network were the journalists and communist militants Isidoro Gilbert, Arturo Lozza, Rodolfo Nadra y Adolfo Coronato (de la Argentina), José Miguel Varas, Luis Córdova, Enrique Martini and José Maldavsky (from Chile), Elvio Romero (from Paraguay); Niko Scwartz and Ricardo Saxlund (from Uruguay), among others.

== Journalistic work ==
Alberto Nadra began his work as a journalist in the weekly publication Propósitos, created by Leónidas Barletta. After that, Nadra was correspondent for local and foreign media, and he also worked as chief of redaction and directed several newspapers. His press investigations took him to Rome, Moscow, Habana, Algeria, Paris, Prague, Samarkanda, Irkutsk. Between 1973 and 1989 he visited Chile, Brazil, Bolivia, Paraguay and Uruguay.

In 1973 he participated in an operation of rescue and diffusion of the last poem of Víctor Jara, written little before his murder in the National Stadium of Santiago de Chile, after the military coup led by Augusto Pinochet. His commitment with the denunciations of the violations of human rights in Argentina continued while he was working as chief of redaction and editor of the South Cone area reporting from Buenos Aires for the Prensa Latina (PL-Cuba) Agency, between 1976 and 1983. In 1977 Nadra received and published one copy of the letter that Rodolfo Walsh sent to the military junta, just before his kidnap and disappearance. From that moment on, PL was the first agency which spread the document in all the world media, even before it was known in Argentina. Nadra was threatened with death and in some partially declassified documents from the CIA he appears as "agent of intelligence" ". In 1979, the Journalists International Organization distinguished his work with the Journalist Merit Award.

In the press syndicalism area, Nadra took part in the Electoral Meeting of the Association Journalists of Buenos Aires (known as APBA in that moment, and then UTPBA), for the elections of July 27 to July 31 of 1972. In those elections participated Jorge Luis Bernetti, Carlos Borro, María Victoria "Vicky" Walsh, Eduardo Molina, Vedia, María Cristina Suárez (Brown List); y Sergio Peralta, Enrique Tortosa, Julio Orione, Walter Fumarola, Ricardo Mainardi, Jorge Marrone (Blue and White List). In 1975 the union was intervened by Isabel Perón government. This situation continued during the following military government.

In 1983, some days after the democratic recovery, Nadra travelled to Moscow as delegate of the Youthful Communist Federation to make a speech in the International Journalists Congress in Moscow. Between 1995 and 1999 he was producer and host of the TV show "Política en Acción", that was broadcast by the Politics and Economic Channel, of the cable TV operator Cablevision.

In 2004 he cofounded "Los 100" (The hundred), collective of journalists and communication workers that encouraged the Audiovisual Communication Services Law. Currently, Alberto Nadra works as organization secretary.

== Teaching ==
During his Sociology and Law studies, he worked as assistant professor in the classes of Carlos Santiago Nino and Enrique Bacigalupo. However, after this period, Nadra moved away of the academic life in order to concentrate his efforts in the political activity. Between 1982 and 1987 he taught journalism and discourse analysis in the Foundation of Economic and Social Studies (Fundación de Estudios Económicos y Sociales) in Argentina, Chile and Bolivia. A few years later he taught Informative Analysis in the Institute of Specialized Journalism (IPE), located in Mercedes, Buenos Aires province. In 1999 he was the director of the course "Ethics, Journalism and Society", in the University of Palermo (Buenos Aires).

== Awards and Distinctions ==
Award for "Professional Merit" of the Journalists International Organization, 1979, for his work on human rights in Argentina.

Award Héctor Oesterheld 2003, for his journalistic work.

== Published books ==
SECRETOS EN ROJO. Un militante entre dos siglos/Alberto Nadra. Buenos Aires, Ediciones Corregidor, 2012. ISBN 978-950-05-2030-0 In June 2015 a corrected and extended version was published and was declared of "Cultural Interest and for the Human Rights Promotion and Defense", by the unanimous vote of the Legislature of the City of Buenos Aires, on November 26 of 2015.

DE KIRCHNER A MACRI. Crónicas de una derrota/Alberto Nadra. Buenos Aires, Ediciones Corregidor, 2016. ISBN 9789500531344

== Bibliography ==
- Gilbert, Isidoro (2011). LA FEDE: Alistándose para la revolución. La Federación Juvenil Comunista 1921-2005. Penguin Random House Grupo Editorial Argentina. ISBN 978-9500734127.
- Lapolla, Alberto (2004). Kronos: La esperanza rota, 1972-1974. Historia de las luchas y organizaciones revolucionarias de los años setenta. De La Campana. ISBN 987-9125-54-1.
- Lapolla, Alberto (2007). Kronos: Los hechos-- y las razones: 1974-1977, 1974-1977: de la muerte de Perón a la muerte de Rodolfo Walsh. Condorcanqui Ediciones. ISBN 9789872382704.
- Nadra, Alberto (2012). SECRETOS EN ROJO. Un militante entre dos siglos. Corregidor. ISBN 978-950-05-2030-0.
- Casola, Natalia (2013). El PC argentino y la dictadura militar: militancia, estrategia política y represión estatal. Imago Mundi. ISBN 978-9507931949.
- Ferrari, Germán (2013). El año de la democracia. Planeta. ISBN 9789504931607.
- "Archivos y colecciones particulares, Biblioteca nacional" (PDF). Archived from the original (PDF) on 2016-07-06. Fondo Fernando Nadra, Biblioteca Nacional.
