= Leila Guerriero =

Argentine journalist and writer (born 1967)

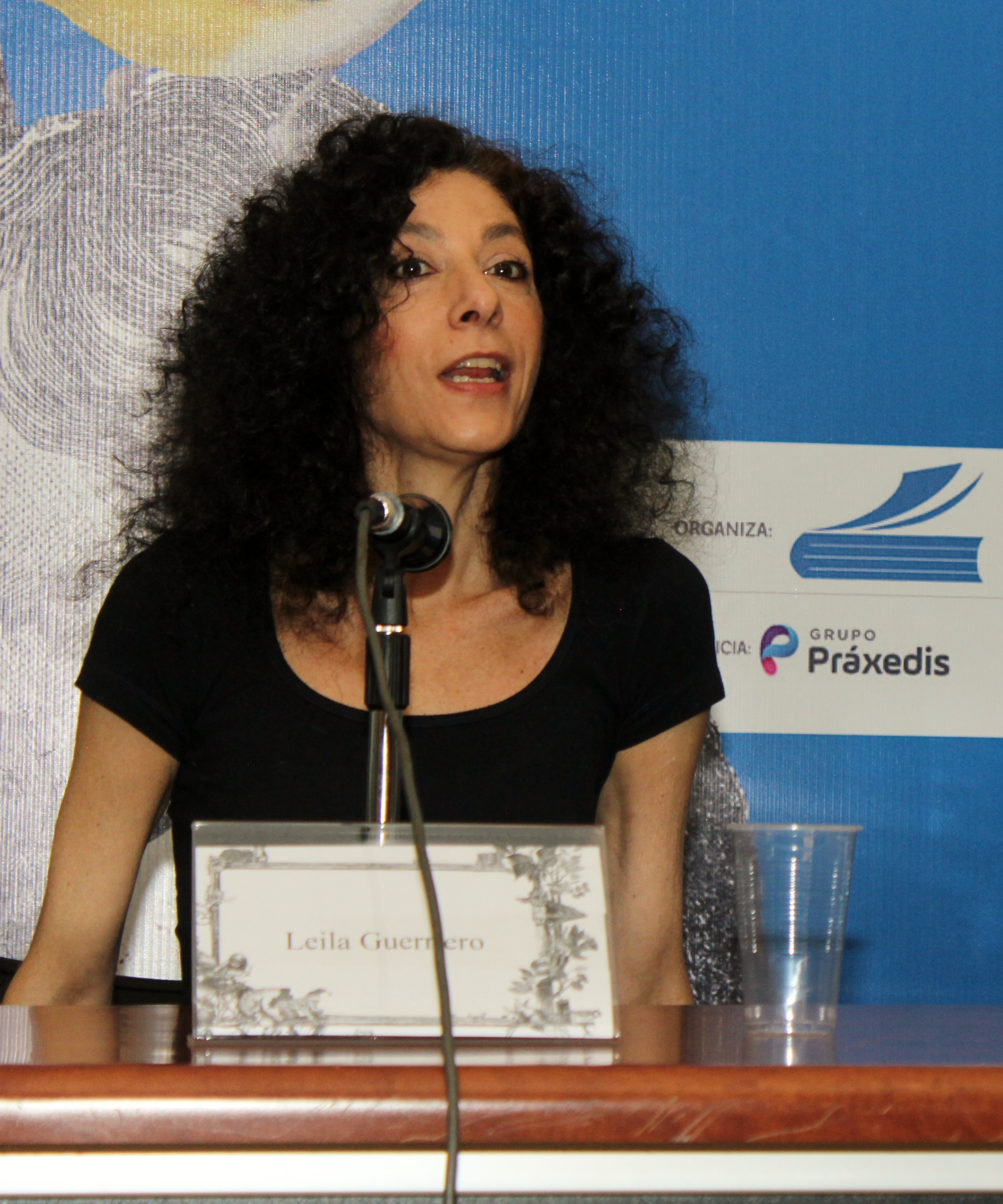
- Leila Guerriero at Santiago International Book Fair 2018
- Born: 17 February 1967 (age 59); Junín, Argentina
- Education: Colegio Nacional Normal Superior de Junín
- Occupations: Journalist, writer
- Notable work: Los suicidas del fin del mundo, Frutos extraños, Plano americano
- Awards: FNPI Award (2010); Konex Award (2014)

Leila Guerriero (born 17 February 1967) is an Argentine journalist and writer.

== Career ==
Leila Guerriero was born to a Syrian-descent father and a German-descent mother. She graduated from the Colegio Nacional Normal Superior de Junín. She studied tourism, a field in which she did not end up working. Her empirical start in journalism was in 1992 when she got her first job as editor at Página/30, a monthly magazine of the newspaper Página/12. After sending a story entitled "Kilómetro cero" to the paper's reception desk, she received, four days later, a call from the then director Jorge Lanata.

Since then her works have appeared in various media such as La Nación and Rolling Stone from Argentina, El País and Vanity Fair from Spain, El Malpensante and SoHo from Colombia, and Paula and El Mercurio de Valparaíso from Chile. In addition, she is the Latin America editor for the Mexican magazine Gatopardo.

In 2010 she won the ninth edition of the Gabriel Garcia Márquez Journalism Award from the Fundación Nuevo Periodismo Iberoamericano (FNPI) in the text category, for her chronicle "El rastro en los huesos", in which she recounts the work carried out by the Argentine Forensic Anthropology Team that identifies the remains of missing persons from the military dictatorship.

In 2014 she received a Konex Award Diploma of Merit in the Chronicles and Testimonies category.

== Works ==
- Los suicidas del fin del mundo, chronicle of a Patagonian town, Tusquets, 2005, ISBN 9788483103463
- Frutos extraños, collected chronicles 2001–2008, Alfaguara, 2009, ISBN 9789587581393
- Los malditos, editor, Ediciones UDP, 2011
- Plano americano, 21 profiles of artists originally published in diverse media, Ediciones UDP, 2013, ISBN 9788433939173
- Una historia sencilla, Anagrama, 2013, ISBN 9788433934338
- Zona de obras, Anagrama, 2015, ISBN 9788433937056
- Cuba en la encrucijada: 12 perspectivas sobre la continuidad y el cambio en La Habana y en todo el país, editor, Knopf Doubleday, 2018, ISBN 9780525563235

== Awards ==
- 2010 Gabriel Garcia Márquez Journalism Award
- 2014 Konex Award
