= Syrian Uruguayans =

Syrian Uruguayan
Sirio-uruguayo السوريون في اوروجواي

Regions with significant populations
- Montevideo

Languages
- Rioplatense Spanish (Uruguayan Spanish), Arabic

Religion
- Christianity, Islam, and Judaism

Related ethnic groups
- Other Uruguayan people, Syrian people

Syrian Uruguayans (Arabic: السوريون في اوروجواي) are Uruguayan citizens of Syrian descent or Syrian-born naturalized Uruguayans.

== Historical background ==
Uruguay has several thousands of people with Arab descent, whose ancestors came mostly from Lebanon; a minority came also from Syria.

There were Muslims, Christians, and also some Jews among them.

== New wave of immigration in the 21st century ==
As of October 2014, Uruguay received a new immigration flow of Syrian people, this time as a consequence of the Syrian Civil War. 42 Syrian people from five families were received by President José Mujica on 9 October. Because of allegedly insufficient support by the government, some Syrians prostested in 2015 and requested visa to leave the country. One family reportedly tried to leave Uruguay via Serbia in August 2015 but was sent back because of missing visa.

== Notable Syrian Uruguayans ==
- Amir Hamed (1962–2017), translator
- Jorge Antonio Chibene (1917–2007), businessman and political figure
- Amin Niffouri (born 1971), politician
- Raquel Daruech (born 1953), journalist

== See also ==
- Syrian diaspora
- Immigration to Uruguay
- Lebanese Uruguayans
- Arab Uruguayans
