= Fernando Nadra =

Argentine lawyer, journalist and public speaker

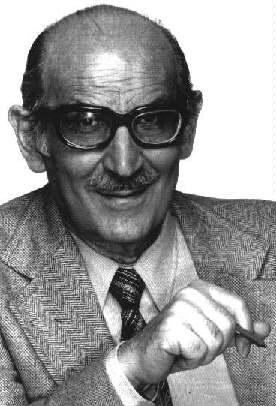
- Born: Fernando Nadra; June 29, 1916; San Miguel de Tucumán, Argentina
- Died: August 22, 1995 (aged 79)
- Education: University of Cordoba
- Occupations: Lawyer, journalist, essayist and speaker
- Spouse: Zulma Ligia Beltramone

Signature
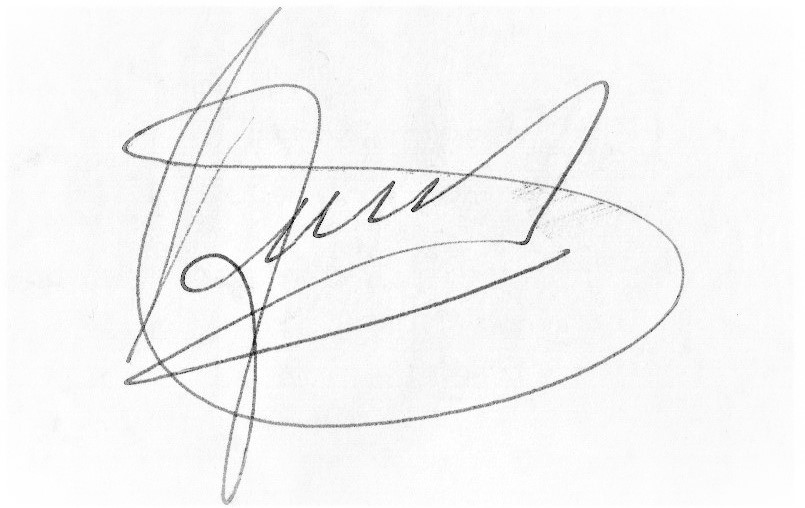

Fernando Nadra (June 29, 1916 – August 22, 1995) was an Argentine lawyer, journalist and public speaker. He was one of the most important leaders of the Partido Comunista Argentino (Argentine Communist Party) and, from his Marxist ideological perspective, took part in most of the important political debates of his time. He stood out from other left-wing leaders of his time for his abilities as an organizer and collective activist, and his numerous attempts to promote agreement among different political sectors through pluralistic dialogue.

As many of his contemporaries, he experienced persecutions, prison and censure.

== Childhood and youth ==
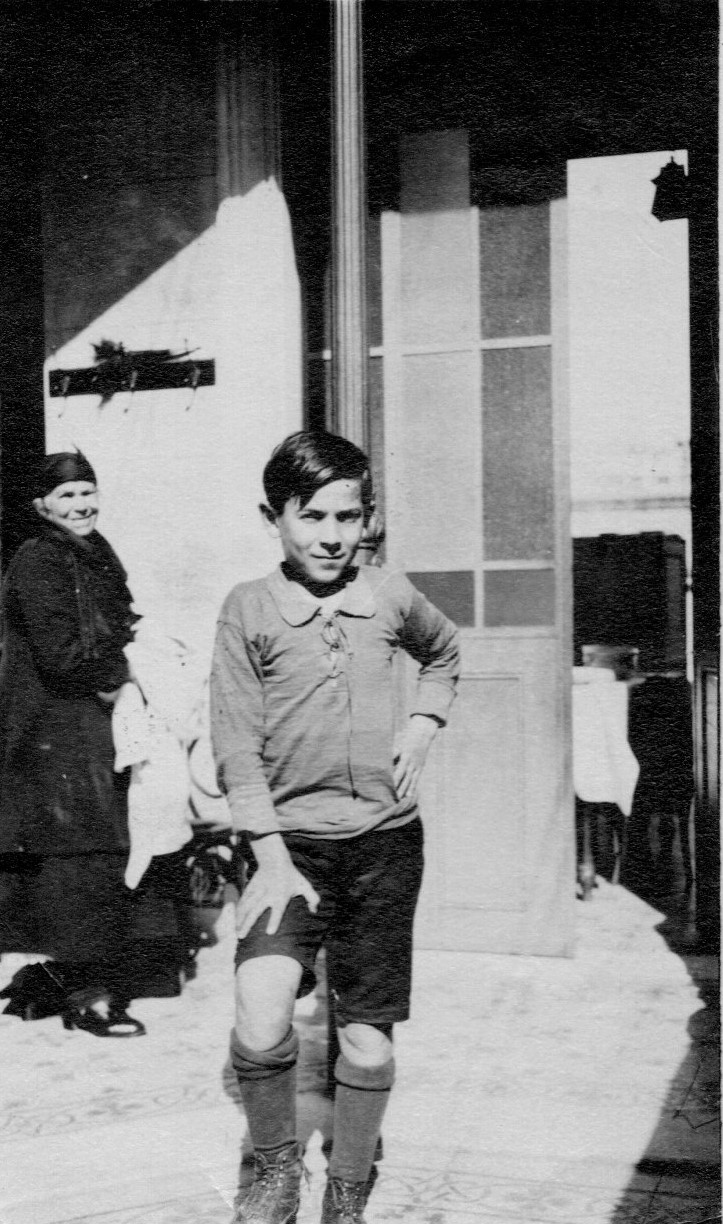
Tucuman 1927, Fernando Nadra in the courtyard of his house. Behind him, his aunt dressed in a traditional Arabian clothing.

Nadra was born to Syrian immigrants, who arrived in San Miguel de Tucumán at the beginning of the 20th century. His mother, Nabiha Louis, was a teacher in her native town, Damascus. His father, Nallib Nadra, a native of Homs, amassed an important fortune in Argentina. Though he started out as a modest trader, he went on to become the first agent of FIAT in the northwest and, later, he devoted himself to the sugar industry.

From his adolescence Fernando Nadra stood out in the social and cultural life of his province. In 1938, at the age of 22, he published his first book of poems “Visión de Cumbre” (Summit View). One of those poems was analyzed in the Argentine volume of a British 19-volume book about the impact of the Spanish Civil War on intellectuals from Hispanic–American countries.

Later, in 1943, Nadra was one of the founders of the poetic and cultural Movement of the Argentine Northwest, with headquarters in Tucumán's La Carpa (The Tent). This movement included personalities like Raúl Galán, Manuel J. Castilla, Raúl Aráoz Anzoátegui, María Adela Agudo, Nicandro Pereyra, Julio Ardiles Gray o José Fernández Molina).

== Student leader ==
Nadra first became involved in politics at the age of 14, as the leader of a take-over at Colegio Nacional Mitre (Mitre National School) in the city of Tucumán, after which he was violently arrested by the local police. Soon after, he was appointed president of Federación de Estudiantes Secundarios de Tucumán (High School Students' Federation of Tucumán).

He studied Law at Universidad Nacional de Córdoba (National University of Cordoba) where he was chosen Secretary of the Students' Centre and, eventually, President of the Federación Universitaria de Córdoba (University Federation of Cordoba). In June 1942, in this role, he delivered a eulogy for his advisor and friend Deodoro Roca, the most important figure of the Reforma Universitaria de 1918 (Argentine University Reform of 1918).

Between 1937 and 1939, he was President of the Federación Universitaria Argentina (Argentine University Federation) and had a crucial role as speaker for the antifascist positions in the III National Congress of Students called by FUA Córdoba in October, 1942.

In 1941, Nazi Germany demanded Ramón S. Castillo's federal intervention of Córdoba and Nadra's detention because –while leading the massive protest on Argentina's Flag Day– Nadra had demanded that the Nazi flag should be replaced by the Argentine flag. The demand was rejected by the police force at the place. The local newspaper "Córdoba" depicted Nadra's reaction as follows;

 "...the young student, who had climbed and reached one of the ends of the Nazi flag, hung it up himself and without losing it, jumped into the sidewalk. The weight of his body broke the flagpole of the flag and everything dropped to the ground,  where the protesters picked it up and readily destroyed it ...  "[6]

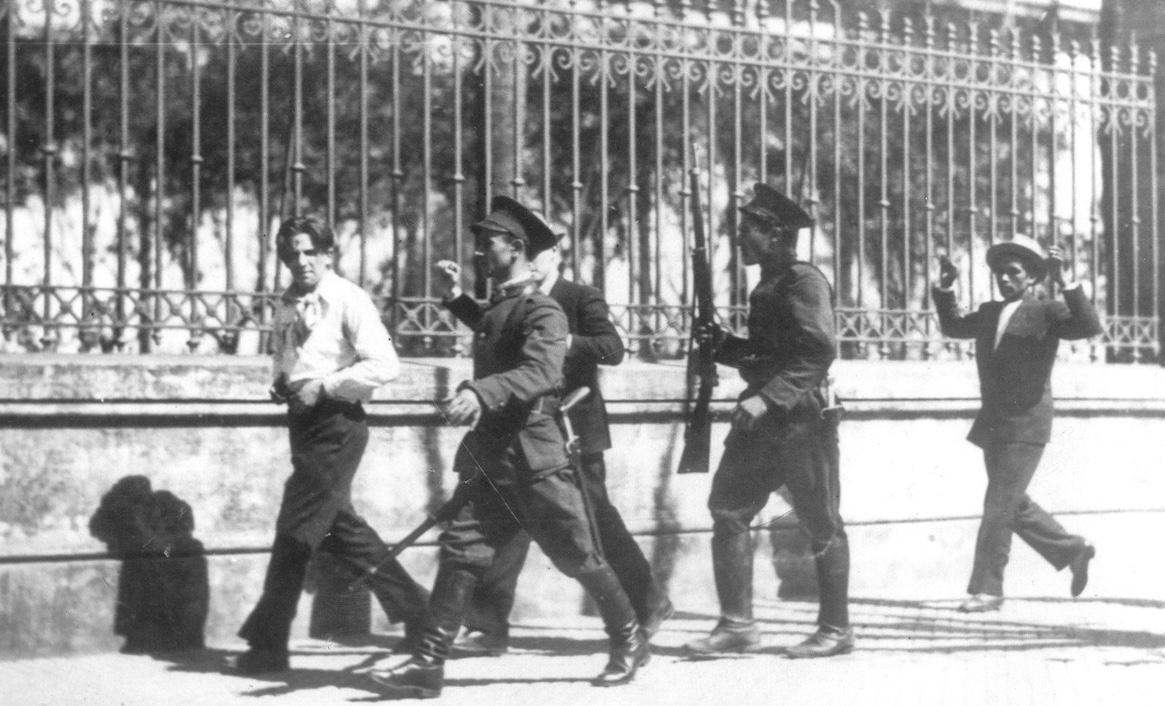
Tucuman, 1930. Fernando Nadra is arrested after Mitre National School's take over.

== Personal and professional life, and affiliation to the Communist Party ==
Fernando Nadra joined the PC in 1939. Even though this decision was questioned by his family, Nadra's commitment did not waver and eventually led him to donate his personal fortune to the PC. His assets came to be handled by what was known as Board of Directors, a secret group within the PC which managed a complex network of companies including laboratories, media and the Coca-Cola Bottling Factory in Argentina.

In 1945, after being imprisoned several times and suspended for two years at the National University of Córdoba, Nadra studied on his own and took the required exams to graduate from Law School. For the next six years, he worked as a lawyer and he also joined the Tucumán Province PC, where he worked as Secretary of Education and Propaganda.

In the elections of February 1946, he was nominated as candidate to National Representative Parliament by Democratic Union, a position he lost by a hundred votes. After the triumph of Peronism, when PC called its XI Congress in Buenos Aires, Nadra attended as a delegate.

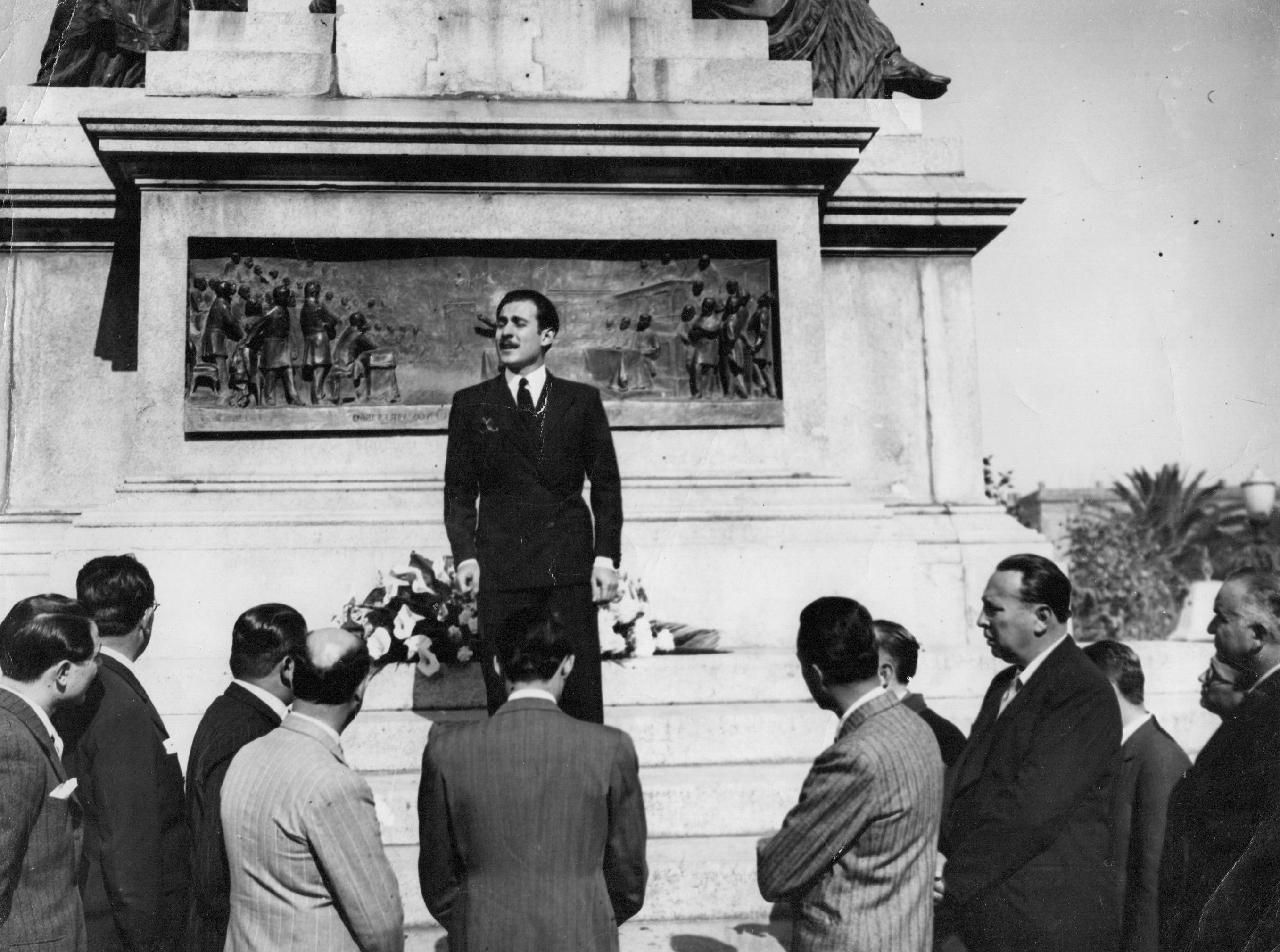
Córdoba, 1941, FUC¨s President.

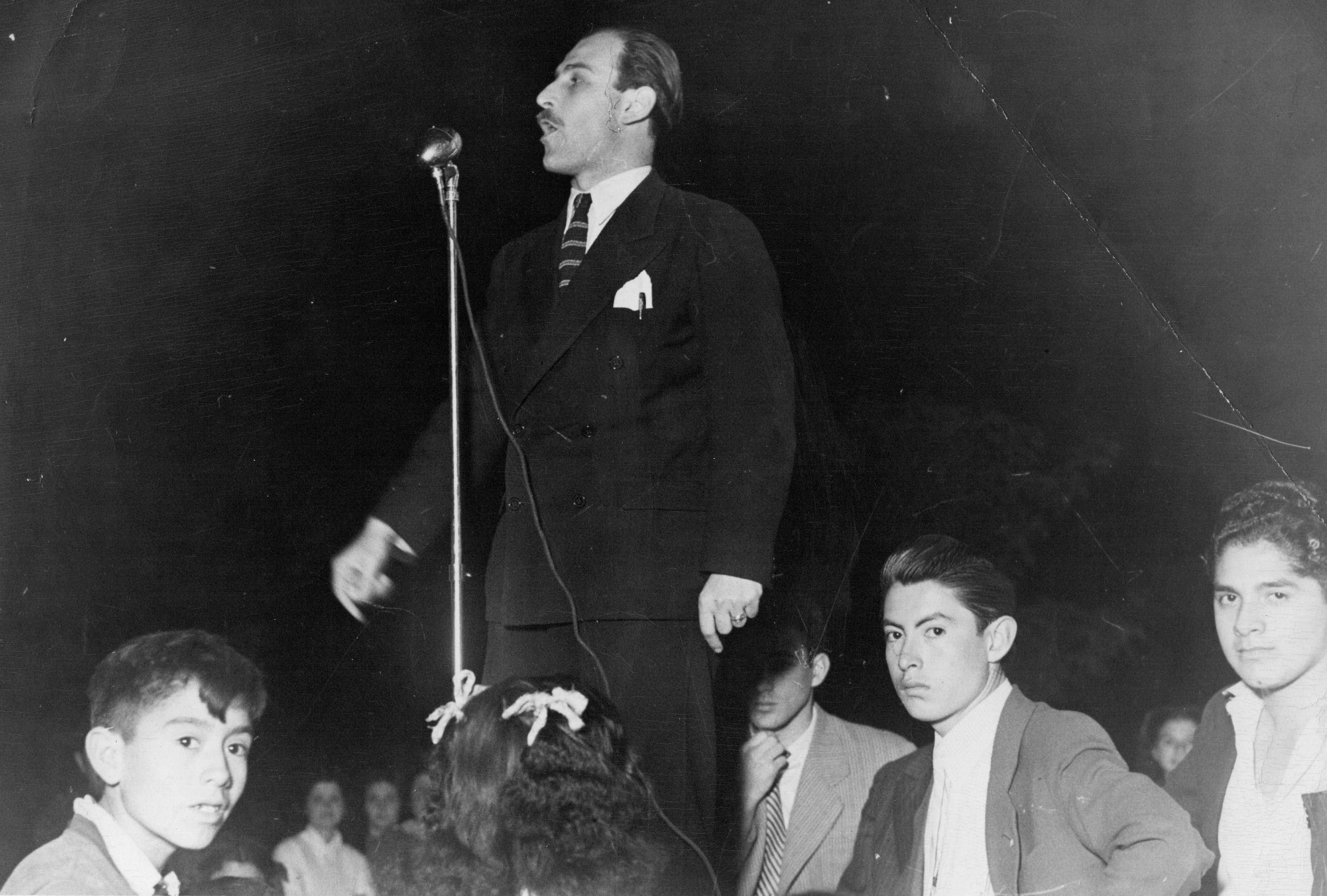
Fernando Nadra in Tucuman, 1946. Public Event as candidate as National Representative Parliament

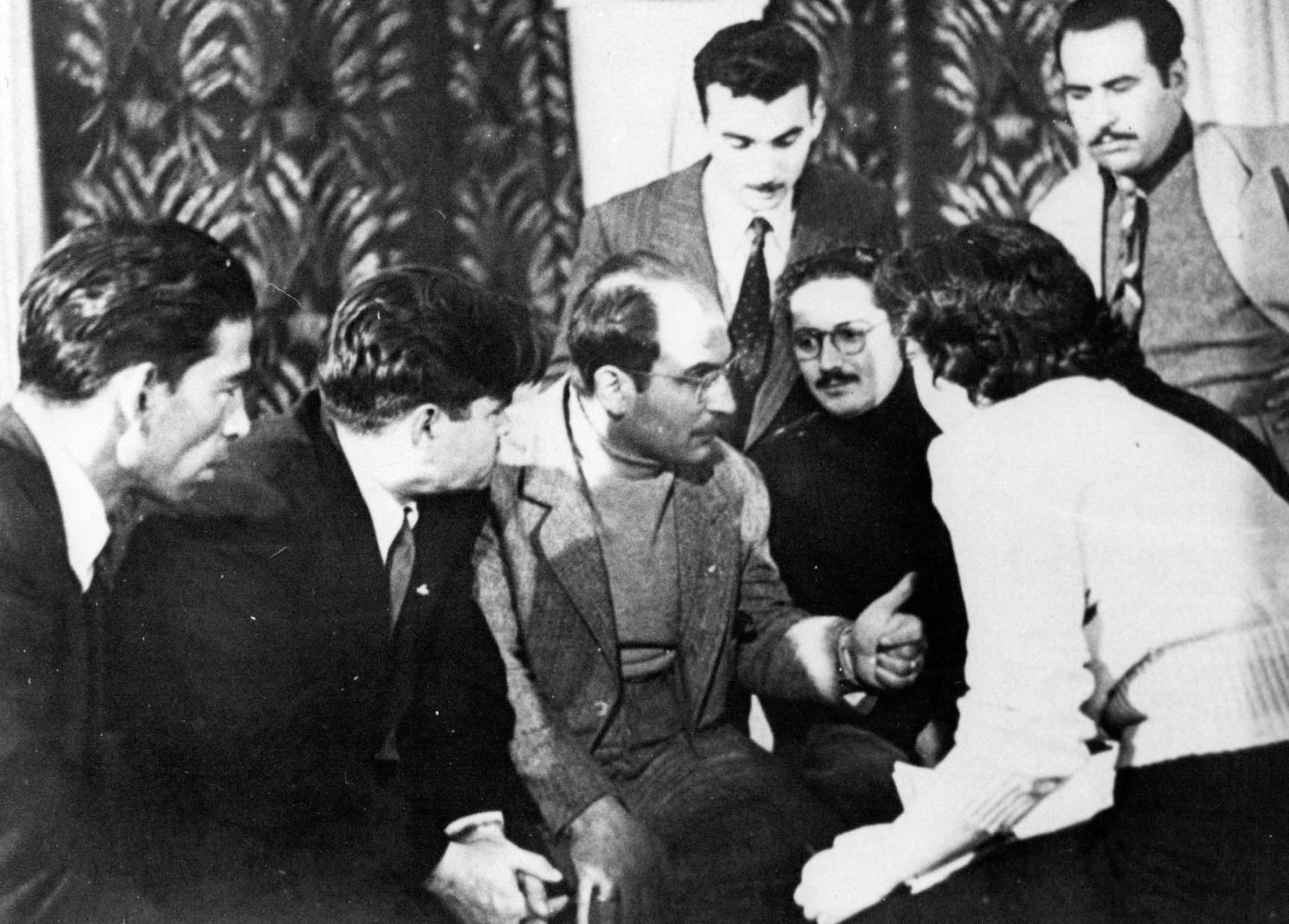
Fernando Nadra in Varsovia, 1950 where he attended to the First Peace Congress. Besides him, to the left Alekséi Marésiev, hero of the Soviet Air Force, whose life was inmortalized by Boris Polevoi in the novel Un hombre de Verdad (A True Man).

In 1946 he also married Zulma Beltramone, from Cordoba Province and began living in Buenos Aires, where he worked as a member of the Capital Federal's PC; during most of Peron's government, he was driven underground while hounded by police forces.

== Support of the Cuban Revolution ==
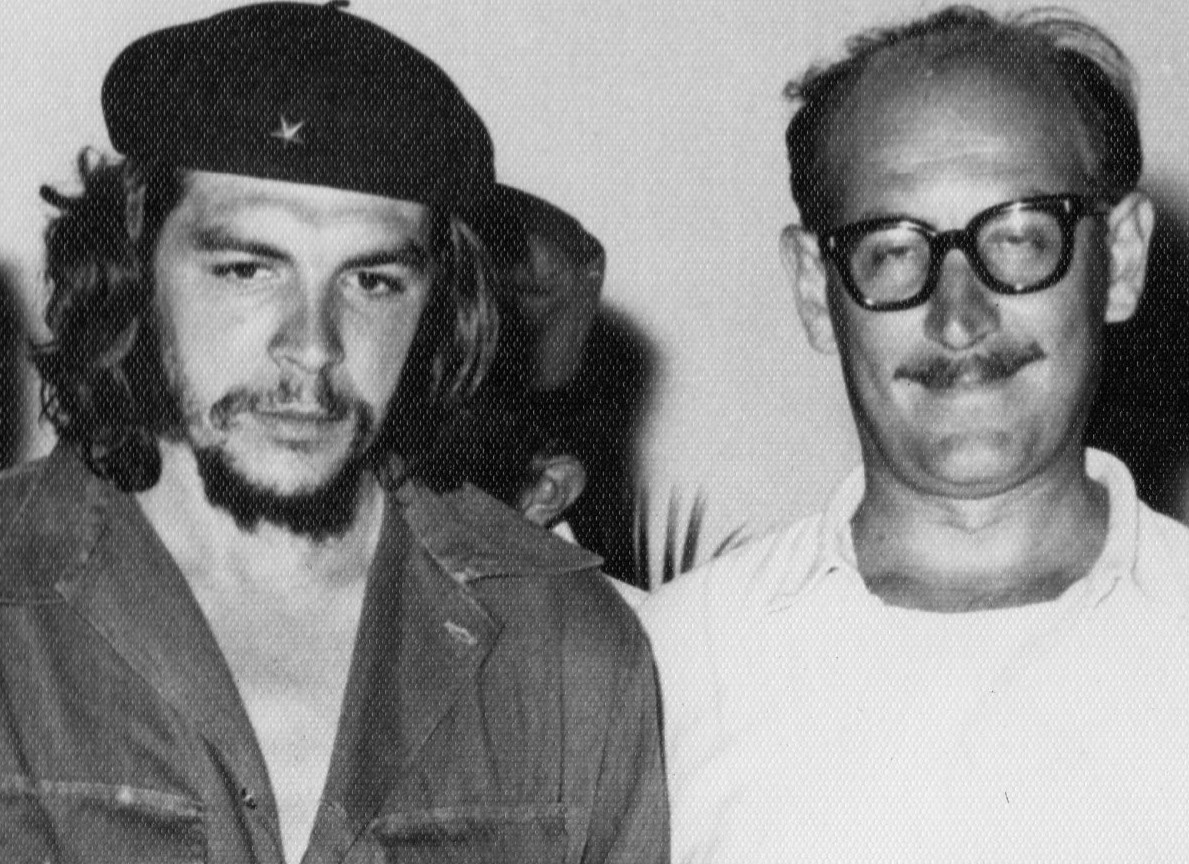
Fernando Nadra in Cuba, La Habana, May, 1960. On his side Ché Guevara.

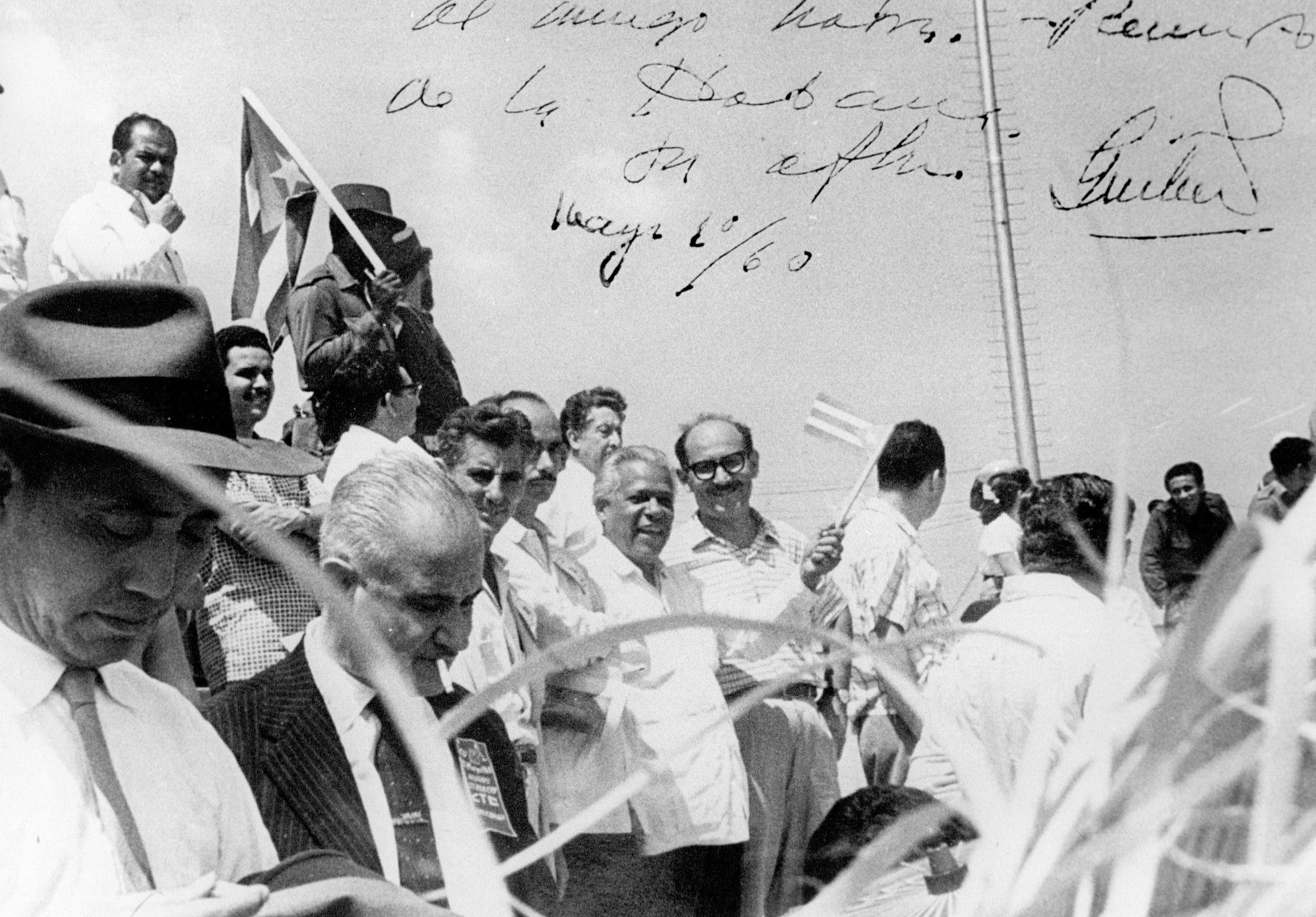
Fernando Nadra in Cuba, La Habana. May, 1960. With his friend Nicolás Guillen.

In April 1960, 13 months after the Cuban Revolution and a year before Fidel Castro proclaimed himself as a socialist, Nadra led the Argentine Delegation of “The First Latin America Meeting of Solidarity with Cuba” in La Habana. John W. Cooke, Abel Alexis Latendorf and Lisandro Viale were also part of this delegation. Together with Salvador Allende and David Alfaro Siqueiros, Nadra wrote the meeting's record, and he also met two times with Ernesto "Che" Guevara.

When he came back to Argentina, Nadra published a leaflet "Cuba, fragua revolucionaria" (“Cuba, Revolutionary Forge”). His defense of Cuba's process was met by resistance on part of the Argentine PC, which opposed the continental strategy of Cuba.

On July 20, 1960, Nadra took part in a roundtable about the Cuban Revolution, at University of Buenos Aires' School of Law, together with Silvio Frondizi, Miguel Ángel Asturias, Alexis Lattendorf and Lisandro Viale. At the end of that meeting, he was arrested by the police and imprisoned at Las Heras Prison. Nadra was then transferred to Caseros Prison, where he shared a cell and built up a friendship with Peronist union leaders Sebastián Borro and Andrés Framini. Nadra spent around two years in different Argentine prisons, some of them in the Southern provinces, where the poor conditions seriously deteriorated his health.

During Nadra's imprisonment, several relatives of political prisoners –including his wife– created the Committee of Relatives of Political and Trade Union Prisoners (COFADE) in order to provide a supportive and legal assistance to prisoners arrested by the State Plan against Internal Disturbances (CONINTES), mainly Peronists and communists.

In an interview between Nadra's wife and former President Arturo Frondizi, who had been friends with Nadra in their youth, the President told her: "I can not do anything. He is a political prisoner of the US Embassy and the CIA. I was told that he was sent by Fidel and Guevara to organize the guerrilla in our country”.

== Dialogue between Catholics and Marxists ==
On October 18, 1965, Nadra, the priest Carlos Mugica and other Communist political leaders and priests held a debate to promote dialogue between Catholics and Marxists (with the name of Dialogue Between Catholics and Marxists), at the Aula Magna of the School of Philosophy and Languages of University of Buenos Aires. The speakers recognized the common ground in principles of both Marxism and Christianity, especially, criticism to the impact of capitalism on the poor. They also agreed to work together to “…end the impoverishment of human life, misery, overexploitation and the lack of basic democratic freedom for everybody [and to] create […] a new form of government which is authentically democratic and for the people".

== The “Argentine Revolution” Dictatorship ==
During the military government that took power between 1966 and 1973, Nadra was the PC's Secretary of National Propaganda. As the military government had banned political parties and passed Law 17401 especially against communist activity, once again, Nadra was persecuted and had to live in hiding. However, also during this time, he supervised the PC's campaign of political agitation through commandos and mass movements.

== Héctor Cámpora's triumph and Support of Perón's candidature ==
Between 1970 and 1973, from his position in the PC, Nadra opposed La Hora del Pueblo, an alliance among traditional parties in Argentine politics to strike a deal with General Lieutenant Alejandro Agustín Lanusse and call for presidential elections. Nadra supported an alternative alliance, The Argentine National Meeting for Democratic Freedoms and Human Rights (ENA), managed by representatives of several political parties, trade unions and social organizations. The ENA also advocated for elections and the enforcement of human and democratic rights, but without excluding parties or political leaders, a concession La Hora del Pueblo was unwilling to make.

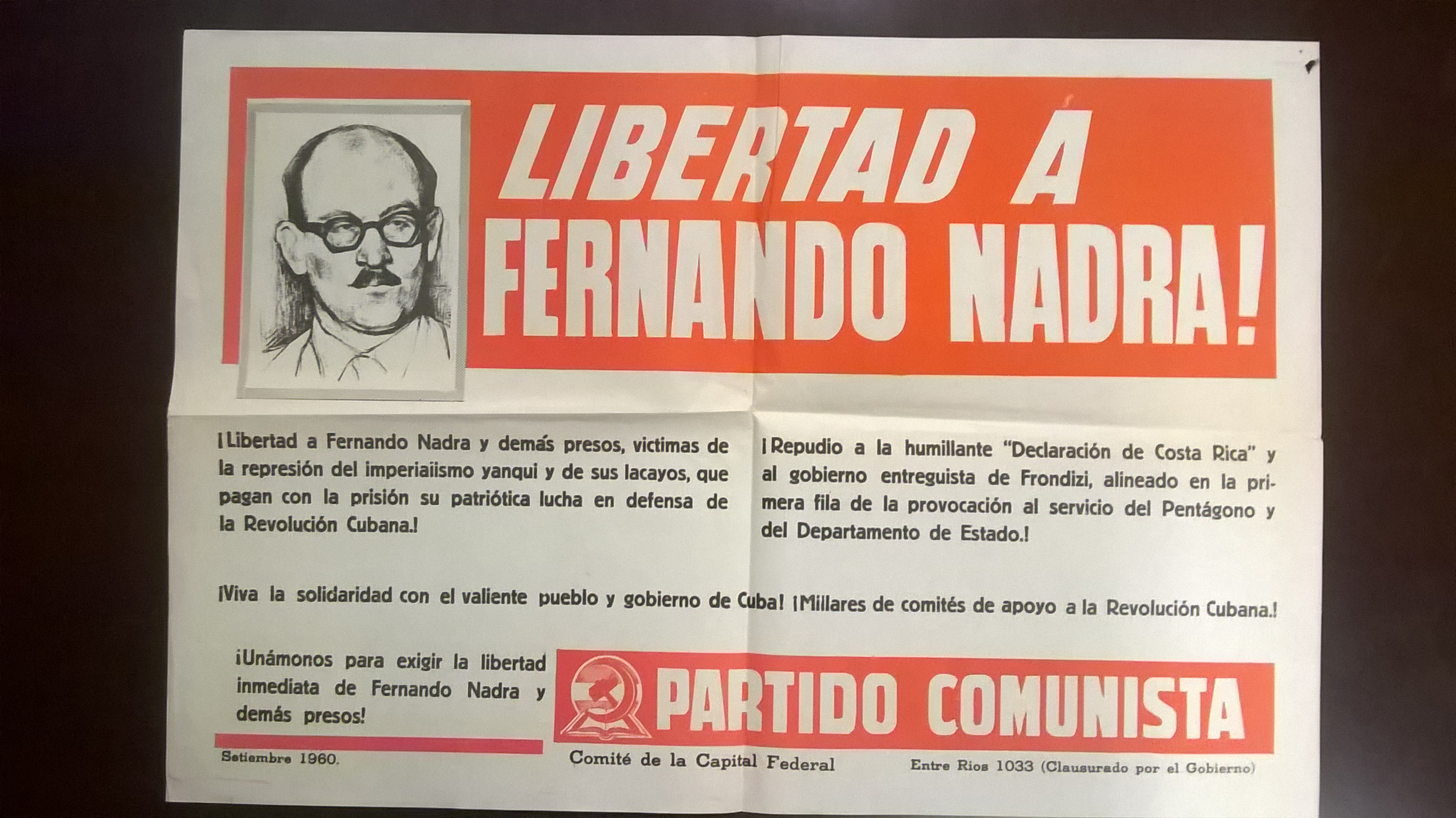
Street flyer demanding freedom for Nadra and others political prisoners, 1960

When the "de facto" government decided “ a conditioned electoral solution”, without Peron's involvement and the proscription of the PC, Nadra promoted the creation of a front including both the PC and Peronism. However, the Peronist Party was not willing to include Communists in any of the two fronts it created along with other political parties: Frente Cívico de Liberación Nacional (FRECILINA) and Frente Justicialista de Liberación (FREJULI), with which it finally would run for the Elections of 1973.

In this situation, Nadra supported an alliance between the PC, the Partido Intransigente (PI), The Christian Revolutionary Party and Unión del Pueblo Argentino (Udelpa) in Alianza Popular Revolucionaria/APR (Popular Revolutionary Alliance). The alliance's presidential formula for the 1973 elections (Oscar Alende-Horacio Sueldo) had almost a million votes, securing dozens of national and provincial representatives, as well as city councillors.

That year, Nadra was appointed Director of Nuestra Palabra, the PC Central Committee's newspaper. Until March 24, 1976, when the military government banned the newspaper (its headquarters were shot by para-police forces), Nadra's articles analyzed the most important events of Argentine political life.

After Cámpora's resignation on July 13, 1973, Nadra was spokesman for the PC's support of Juan Perón for the upcoming presidential elections. After Perón's triumph, Nadra met various times with the President, both bilaterally and with other leaders of the PC or of parties with parliamentary representation ( PST, PI and UCR, among others that conformed the Group of 8 “Grupo de los 8”). Nadra understood these meetings –which he did not have with the next Peronist president– as an opportunity to express concerns, criticisms and proposals, and eventually build a political consensus to work on Argentina's most pressing economic and social problems.

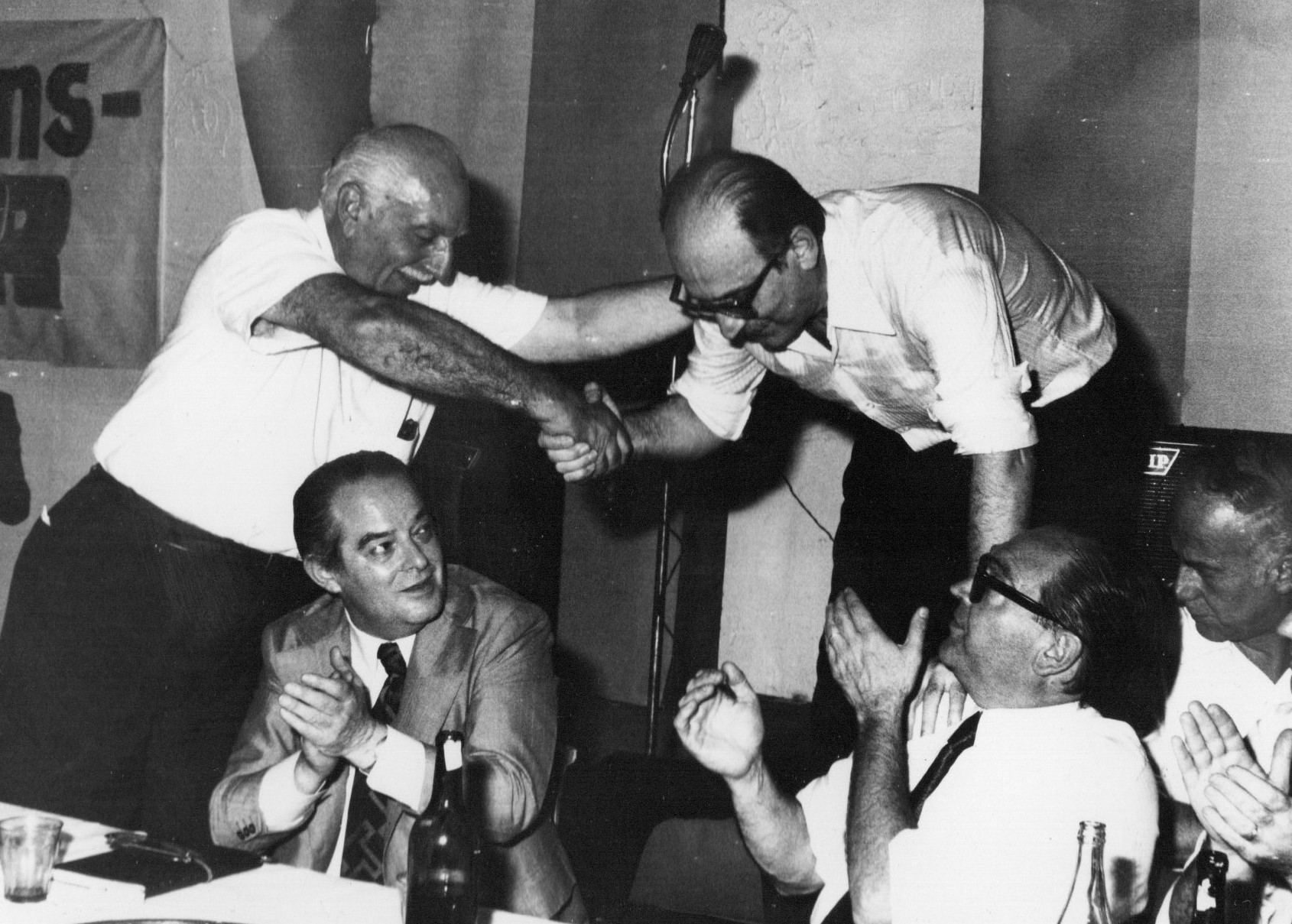
Fernando Nadra in an event of APR, in Fortin 0, 28-02-73, with Oscar Alende and Rafael Marino.

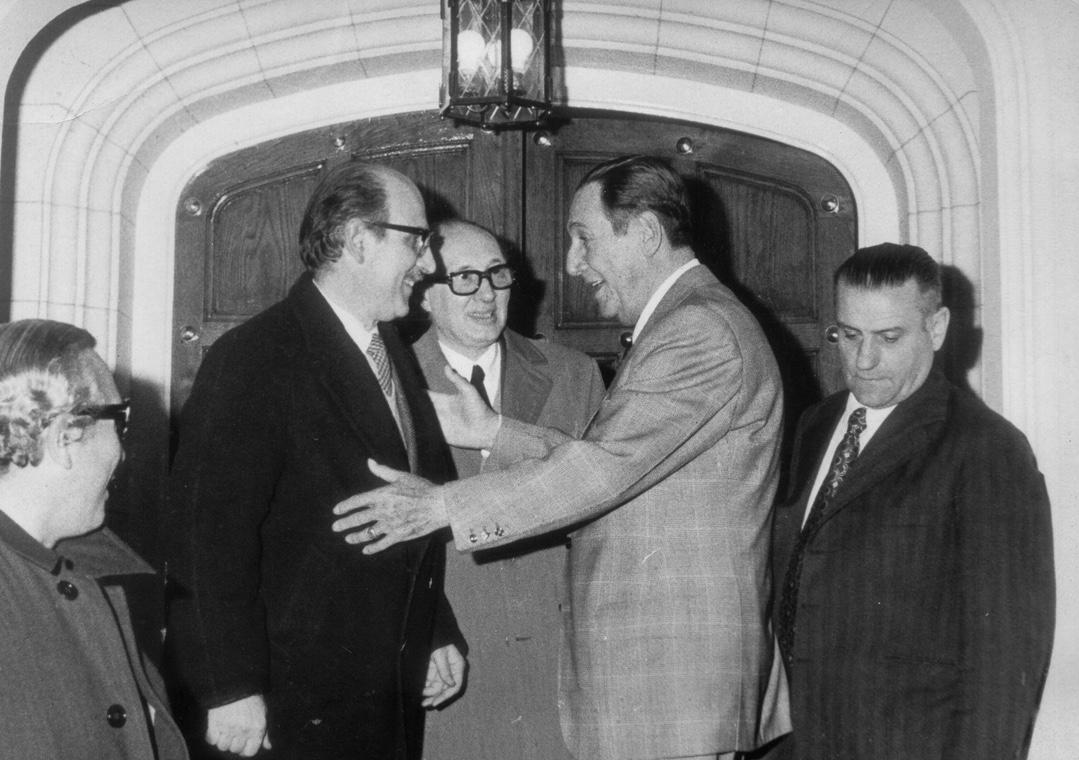
Fernando Nadra at Gaspar Campos, 1973, with Perón, R. Iscaro and H. Agosti.

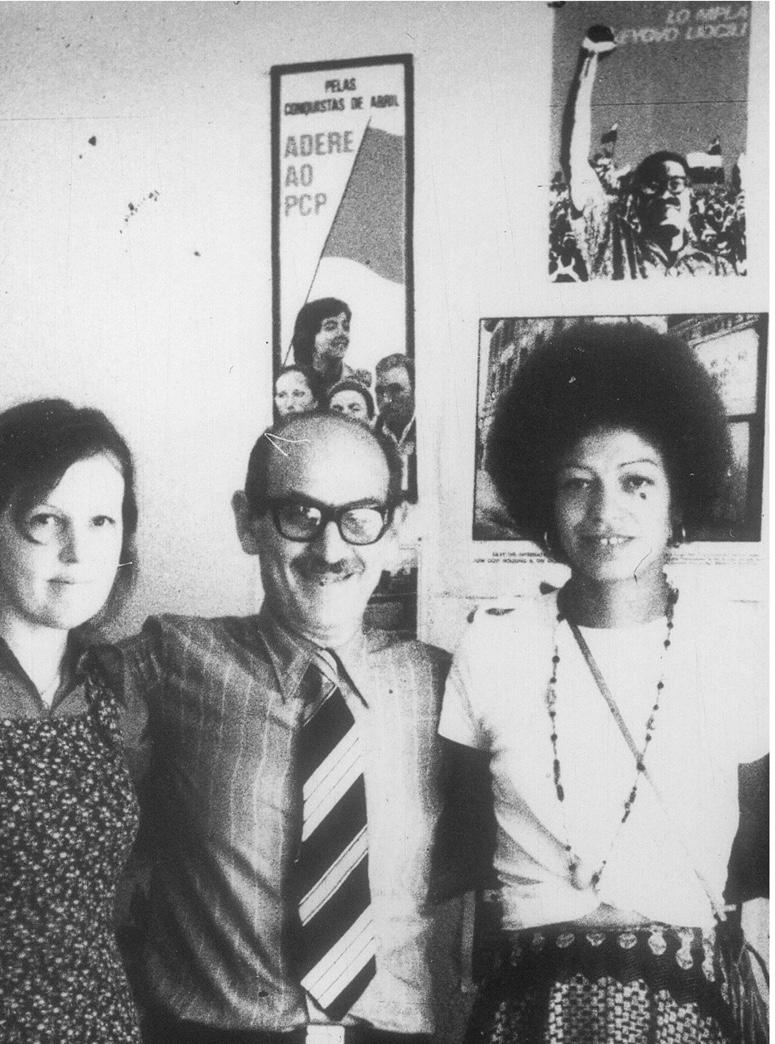
Fernando Nadra, San Francisco, USA, 1978, with Angela Davis.

Between 1974 and 1976, Nadra was frequently threatened by the Argentine Anticommunist Alliance, which was supported by part of the Peronist Government; he was also usually criticized by the magazine El Caudillo.

== Civic- Military Dictatorship 1976-1983 ==
With a heightening the economic and political crisis during Isabel Perón's presidency and the rise to power of several dictatorships in South America, Nadra warned about the possibility of a new military coup in Argentina, about “a bloodbath, like in Chile, and the danger of a civil war and the rise of a dictatorship very much like the ones already existing in five countries which surround us" (A policy against people and Nation. Are the painful experiences of 1930, 1943, 1955 and 1966 not enough?).

In this context, Nadra supported the PC's proposal to face an eventual military coup through democratic Cabinet including both civilians from different political parties and members of the Military, which was thought would be useful in a transition towards upcoming elections. It is possible that Argentine communists were overestimating the relevance of data provided by military members of the PC, which was based on experiences like the Revolución de los Claveles (Revolution of Carnations) in Portugal and the revolutions of Generals Juan José Torres, in Bolivia, Juan Velasco Alvarado, in Perú, Omar Torrijos, in Panamá or René Schneider and Carlos Prats, from the so-called ”línea legalista” (legalist faction) of the Chilean army. Official PC documents from before the 1976 coup d'état show that the PC never clearly opposed a dictatorship at that stage, being more concerned with diminishing the influence of those factions within the military which advocated a dictatorship like Pinochet's in Chile, even if it meant strengthening those factions within the military which eventually initiated the 1976 dictatorship.

Even though Nadra disagreed with the PC's approach on this matter, and voiced his dissent in the privacy of its Committee meetings, his loyalty to the PC demanded that he publicly defend the party line. However, during the 1980s, he would describe the PC's managing of the 1976 as naive and also criticize the party (and also himself, as its speaker) for not quickly and publicly condemning the dictatorship as State terrorism.

Even though the leaders of the PC never openly condemned the military government, the PC was actively involved in the resistance against the military dictatorship through the actions of teachers, students and unions. It also helped organize the first meetings of Committee of Relatives of the Disappeared and Detained Prisoners for Political Reasons and the Mothers of the Plaza de Mayo in the Argentine League for Human Rights. Additionally, Nadra was a member of the Council of the Permanent Assembly for Human Rights and tens of relatives of the disappeared came to him and recognized his support and his mediation with the authority in a lot of cases. In 1979, Nadra held a meeting with OEA's Inter American Commission for Human Rights to provide information about Clandestine Detention Centres (CCD's)and the role of the Armed Forces in the kidnapping and disappearance of the communist student Inés Ollero.

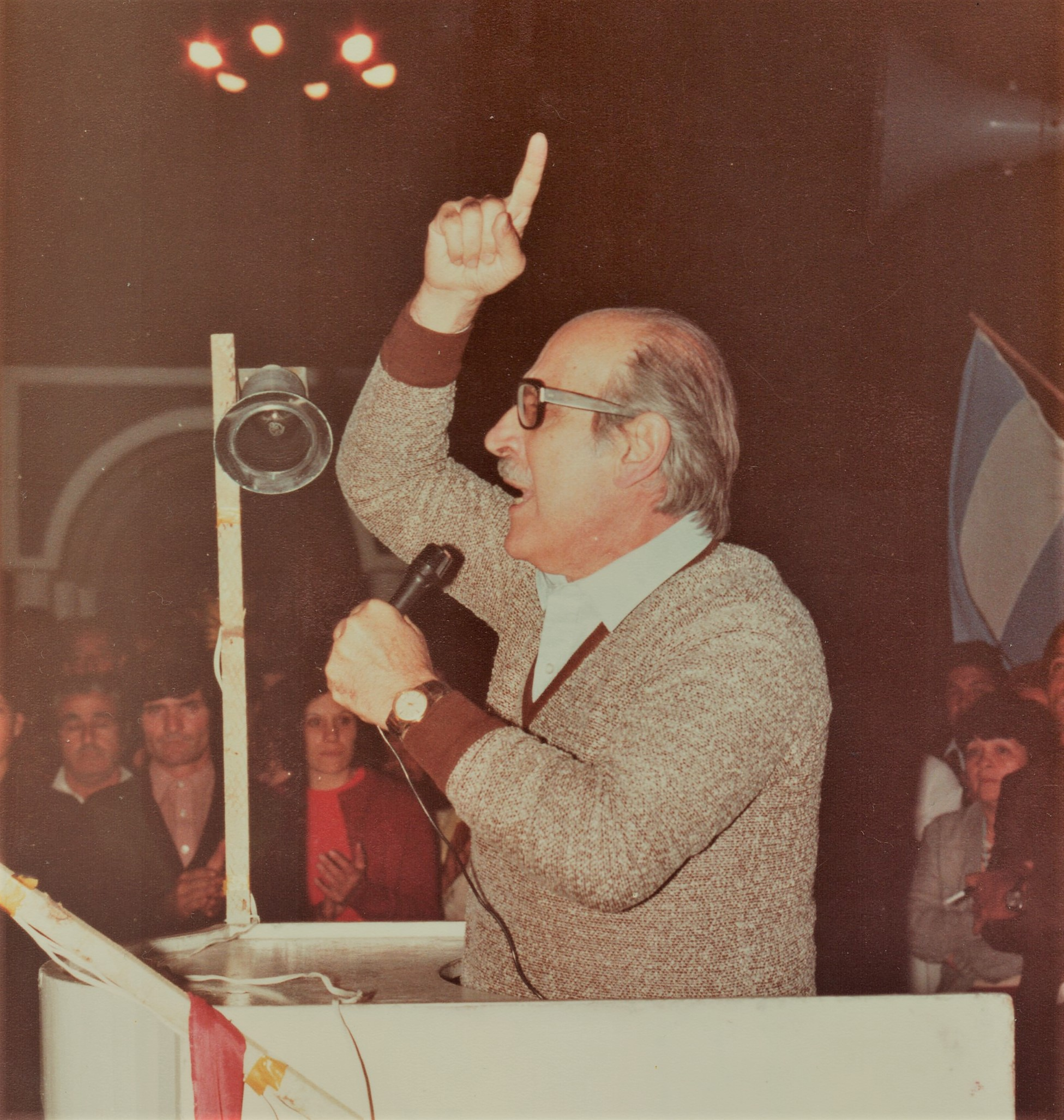
Fernando Nadra in an event in the principal square of Lanus, Elections 1983.

The military government included Nadra in “Formula 4”, the top tier of “black lists” with the names of those persons suspected to be “subversives” and thus forbidden to hold government offices and appear in the media. Consequently, some of Nadra's works were among those which were forbidden and destroyed in the 1976-1983 period.

== "Multipartidaria" and Return to Democracy ==
Between 1976 and 1983, Nadra focused on the protection of human rights and in forming political and social alliances to pave the way for democracy. Thus, he was one of the promoters of Multipartidaria, an alliance of the main political parties to push for democracy. However, Nadra had significant disagreements with Ricardo Balbín's Radical Civil Union and a faction within the Christian Democratic Party, which led to the PC's exclusion from the formal call for the Multipartidaria in 1981.

Nadra's friendship with Radical leader Raúl Alfonsín did not prevent him from supporting the Peronist presidential formula in 1983 (as the PC dictated) or opposing some of Alfonsin's policies as President. Thus, in 1987, Nadra strongly refused the enactment of Punto Final and Obediencia Debida (Full Stop Law and Law of Due Obedience) which, in his opinion, were concessions in human rights policies no government should make. He also rejected Alfonsin's economic policy after Bernardo Grispun's resignation and the appointment of Juan Sourrouille as Minister of Economy. In fact, on April 26, 1985 during a mobilisation called to protect democracy and when the President announced a “war economy”, Nadra led the large communist lines that left Plaza de Mayo. However, Nadra also took part in the support of Alfonsin's sponsoring of the Trial of the Juntas and the president's foreign policies. In this context, Nadra spoke with President Alfonsín and Ernesto Cardenal, Minister of Culture of Nicaragua, in an event supporting a Treaty of Peace with Chile about the Beagle Channel, at Vélez Sarsfield Stadium. In November, 1985, Nadra ran for the Chamber of Deputies in the list of Frente del Pueblo (The People's Front), an electoral alliance between the PC, factions of Peronism and a broad variety of leftist non-conservative and trostkist leaders, which Nadra himself promoted.

== Resignation to the Communist Party ==
In the middle of the 1980s, Nadra began to work with the Youth branch of the PC, the Communist Youth Federation, to review historical and contemporary positions of the PC. In 1985, he led the party Committee which analyzed the thesis for the PC's XVI Congress from a deeply critical perspective, both of the PC's positions and of his own; most of the PC Secretariat resisted this critical approach. However, despite the success of the self-critical approach of the XVI Congress, in 1986, Nadra renounced the Secretariat and the Political Committee of the PC.

Even though he agreed to do this with the Congress, he became the target of a discrediting campaign. The new leaders of the PC used Nadra's status as one of the party's better-known leaders and used him as a scapegoat to place the blame for the PC's past mistakes. Thus, falsehoods were spread about Nadra's actions in previous decades: it was said he had dinner with dictator Videla or held private meetings with other military officers. However, Nadra never dined with Videla and he only had meetings with military officers in order to ask about disappeared or imprisoned people. During the discredit campaign, Nadra was also accused of supporting Carlos Menem ´s presidency. Although Nadra had a good relationship with Menem, he had a meeting with him to criticize the President's economic policy (especially the “Bunge and Born Plan), the pardon of dictators and the death penalty. As a matter of fact, Menem offered Nadra an appointment as Ambassador in the Soviet Union or Cuba, but Nadra refused the offer.

However, after Nadra's meeting with Menem, on March 14, 1989, the Central Committee of PC suspended Nadra. Facing unfair and unfounded accusations and an atmosphere of mistrust within his own party, Nadra decided to resign a year later. In his book Why I resigned to the Communist Party, Nadra explains his unsuccessful struggle to change the “stalinist orientation” of his party from within. The book both describes and criticizes the PC's line and methods but is also profoundly self-critical, elaborating on some of the ideas Nadra had outlined in his previous work, The Religion of Atheists. About Stalinism in the Argentine Communist Party. After leaving the PC, Raúl Alfonsin invited Nadra to take part in the list of UCR's Constituents for the Amendment of the Argentine Constitution in 1994. Although he did not agree to represent a non-marxist party, Nadra acted as Alfonsín's advisor during the amendment debate in Santa Fé

== Death ==
The circumstances surrounding Nadra's resignation to the PC negatively affected his health. From that moment on he began a battle against cancer that led to his death on August 22, 1995, at the age of 79. Many political, social and cultural figures attended his funeral. Even though Nadra was an atheist, his friend Justo Laguna –Emeritus Bishop of Morón– said a prayer for him, in which he mentioned the links between Christian principles and Nadra's socialist worldview. He also emphasized Nadra's moral principles, commitment to justice and love for humankind.

== Works ==
- Visión de Cumbre (Summit View) Poems, Poemas. Editorial Liberia, 1938.
- La herencia libertadora y pacifista de San Martín. (The Liberating and Pacifist Legacy of San Martin) Editorial Fundamentos, 1950.
- La crisis textil. (The Textile Crisis)Editorial Signo, 1953.
- El petróleo para los argentinos y la paz. (Oil for Argentines and Peace)Editorial Signo, 1955.
- El Plan Prebisch. (The Prebisch Plan) Editorial Anteo, 1956.
- Egipto, Suez y el mundo árabe. (Egypt, Suez and the Arabian World) Editorial Anteo, 1956.
- 10 preguntas sobre el petróleo.(Ten Questions about Oil) Editorial Anteo, 1959.
- Cuba, fragua revolucionaria. (Cuba, Revolutionary Forge) Editorial Anteo, 1960.
- Elecciones, golpe y democracia. (Elections, Coup d'état and Democracy) Editorial Anteo, 1962.
- Problemas de la Propaganda Partidaria. (Problems with Party Propaganda) Editorial Anteo, 1963.
- Por el camino de la Primera Internacional. (Lessons from First International). Editorial Impulso, 1964.
- Dialogo entre católicos y marxistas (en colaboración). (Dialogue between Catholics and Atheists) (with other authors) Editorial Diálogos, 1965.
- 9 de julio: ayer y hoy. (July 9: Yesterday and Today) Editorial Anteo, 1966.
- Las vías de la revolución. (Violence and Revolutionary Processes). Editorial Polémica, 1968.
- ¿Qué pasó en Checoslovaquia? (What happened in Czechoslovakia?). Editorial Polémica, 1968.
- Argentina, hoy, ¿Cuál es la salida? (Argentina Today, Which is the solution?). Editorial Anteo, 1970.
- Vigencia del leninismo (en colaboración).(Leninism Today) (with other authors) Editorial Anteo, 1970.
- Perón: hoy y ayer. (Peron: Yesterday and Today). Editorial Polémica y Voz Juvenil, 1971.
- Socialismo Nacional (National Socialism). Editorial Sílaba, 1974. This book was translated into several languages.
- Un año de gobierno peronista. (The First Year of Peronist Government). Editorial Sílaba, 1974. This book was translated into several languages.
- San Martin, hoy (San Martin, Today). Editorial Cartago, 1974. This book was translated into several languages.
- Reflexiones sobre el terrorismo (On Terrorism). Editorial Aporte, 1976.
- Fraseología Política (Political Phraseology). Editorial Fundamentos, 1978.
- Estados Unidos, grandezas y miserias. (Virtues and Vices of the United States). Editorial Mundo Actual, 1978.
- Democracia y partidos políticos.(Democracy and Political Parties). Editorial Fundamentos, 1979.
- Cuba: la isla indómita.(Cuba: the wild island). Editorial Fundamentos, 1979.
- El nuevo hombre soviético.(The new Soviet Man) Editorial Fundamentos, 1981. (translated into Russian) (traducido al Ruso).
- ¿Por qué el Frente, hoy? Acerca del Frente de Liberación Nacional y Social (About the National and Social Liberation Front) Editorial Anteo, 1984.
- Conversaciones con Perón. (Conversations with Peron). Editorial Anteo, 1985.
- La religión de los ateos. Reflexiones sobre el estalinismo en el Partido Comunista Argentino. (The Religion of Atheists. About Stalinism in the Argentine Communist Party). Editorial Punto Sur, 1989.
- Por qué renuncié al Partido Comunista (Why I resigned to Communist Party). Edición del autor, 1990.
- La Utopía Posible. (A Possible Utopia). Corregidor, 1995.

== Bibliography ==
- ACADEMIA NACIONAL DE LA HISTORIA DE LA REPÚBLICA ARGENTINA (2003). Nueva Historia de la Nación Argentina. Buenos Aires: Planeta. ISBN 9504902146.
- ALFONSÍN, Raúl (2004). Memoria política: transición a la democracia y derechos humanos. Buenos Aires: Fondo de Cultura Económica (FCE). ISBN 9505579934
- ANZORENA, Oscar R. (1998). Tiempo de Violencia y Utopía. Del Golpe de Onganía al Golpe de Videla (1966-1976). Buenos Aires: Ediciones del Pensamiento Nacional. ISBN 950-581-818-1
- ARTURI, Lucía (2014). El Partido Comunista durante el trienio peronista (1973 – 1976), a través de la mirada de Fernando Nadra. Repositorio Universidad Torcuato Di Tella. UTDT
- BILOTTI, Eduardo (2006). Enciclopedia argentina de agrupaciones políticas,1800-2003. Buenos Aires: Editorial de los Cuatro Vientos. ISBN 9875645710
- BRACELI, Rodolfo (2012). Mercedes Sosa, La Negra. Buenos Aires: Sudamericana. ISBN 9500731967
- CASOLA, Natalia (2015). El PC argentino y la dictadura militar. Militancia, estrategia política y represión estatal. Buenos Aires: Ediciones Imago Mundi. ISBN 9789507931949
- CONCHEIRO, Elvira y otros, (2007). El comunismo, otras miradas desde América Latina. Ciudad de México: Universidad Nacional Autónoma de México (UNAM).
- DUGUECH, Carlos (2013). Uno mismo. Buenos Aires: Editorial de los Cuatro Vientos. ISBN 9789870808176
- GALASSO, NORBERTO (2005). Perón: Formación, ascenso y caída, 1893-1955. Buenos Aires, Ediciones Colihue. ISBN 950-581-399-6
- GALASSO, NORBERTO (2011). Historia de la Argentina. Desde los pueblos originarios hasta el tiempo de los Kirchner, Tomo II. Buenos Aires: Ediciones Colihue. ISBN 978950563477-4
- GILBERT, Isidoro, (2009). La FEDE, alistándose para la revolución: la Federación Juvenil Comunista, 1921-2005. Buenos Aires: Sudamericana. ISBN 9789500734127
- GRAHAM-YOOL, Andrew (1989). De Perón a Videla. Buenos Aires: Legasa. ISBN 9506001413
- KLEINER, Bernardo (1964). Veinte años de Movimiento Estudiantil Reformista.Buenos Aires: Editorial Platina
- LAPOLLA, Jorge Alberto (2005) Kronos: historia de las luchas y organizaciones revolucionarias de los años setenta. Trilogía. La Plata: De La Campana. ISBN 9789879125403
- MORALES SOLÁ, Joaquín (1990). Asalto a la Ilusión. Historia secreta del poder en la Argentina desde 1983. Buenos Aires: Planeta. ISBN 9507420134
- NADRA, Alberto (2015). Secretos en Rojo. Un militante entre dos siglos. Buenos Aires: Corregidor. ISBN 9789500520300.
- NADRA, Fernando (1989). La Religión de los Ateos. Reflexiones sobre el estalinismo en el Partido Comunista Argentino. Buenos Aires: Punto sur Editores. ISBN 950988944X
- NADRA, Fernando (1990). ¿Por qué renuncié al Partido Comunista? Cartas, documentos, apuntes, testimonios y recuerdos. Buenos Aires: Edición del autor.
- PODERTI, Alicia (2000). La narrativa del noroeste argentino: historia socio-cultural. Salta: Universidad Nacional de Salta. ISBN 9879946030
- REDACCIÓN, Revista (1989 Y 1995). Temas 190/200 y 251/258. Buenos Aires: Editorial Réplica.
- ROMERO R y TORRES A (1998). La lucha continúa: el movimiento estudiantil argentino en el siglo XX. Buenos Aires: Eudeba. ISBN 9502308247
- UNIVERSIDAD DE BELGRANO, Fundación (1986). Seminario Permanente sobre la Reforma Constitucional. Buenos Aires: Edición Universidad de Belgrano.
- TARCUS, H y EHRLICH, L (2007). Diccionario biográfico de la izquierda argentina: de los anarquistas a la "nueva izquierda", 1870-1976. EMECE. ISBN 9500429144
- VARIOS (1965). Ciencias Sociales Contemporáneas, Volumen 1, Tema 2. Moscú: Academia de Ciencias de la URSS.
- VICENTE, Néstor (2006). Augusto Conte. Padre de la Plaza. Buenos Aires: Galerna. ISBN 9505564791
