= Jorge Antonio =

Argentine businessman and politician

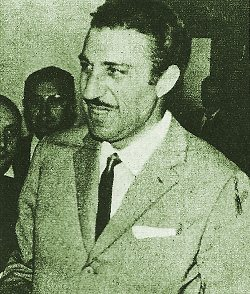
- Antonio in 1965
- Born: October 14, 1917; Carmelo, Uruguay
- Died: February 11, 2007 (age 89); Buenos Aires, Argentina
- Occupations: Businessman and Political Figure
- Spouse: Esmeralda (1st wife)

Jorge Antonio (October 14, 1917 – February 11, 2007) was an Argentine business man and political figure, a close adviser to President Juan Domingo Perón.

== Early life ==
Born Jorge Antonio Chibene in La Boca, Buenos Aires to Syrian immigrants (his father was an émigré who arrived in Argentina from Syria in the 19th century, and whose name was Elias Antun Esquef), Antonio grew up in Uruguay and returned to Argentina at 17 years of age. He was an orderly at the National Military Academy in 1942, and worked in several businesses before being appointed as the representative of General Motors and Mercedes-Benz in Argentina. In this post, in 1949 he met Perón again, having first met him briefly in 1943, and would become one of Perón's most important advisers.

== Association with Peronism ==
Antonio's fortune grew, connected with his friendship with Juan Duarte, Perón's brother-in-law. In the 1950s, Antonio bought the media companies Radio Belgrano, Canal 7 and the Télam agency. He also invested in agribusiness and owned a bank, building his importance to the Presidency. It was reported that his fortune grew in the ten years to 1955 to US$215 million, and to opponents, Antonio's wealth became emblematic of the cronyism Perón encouraged during his presidency. Among his employees was Adolf Eichmann, under his assumed name of Ricardo Clement. Antonio admitted that he knew Eichmann's real identity. He was often linked with stories of 'Nazi Gold', money brought to Argentina, the United States, and other safe havens by Nazis fleeing Germany.

When Perón was deposed by the military coup of September 1955, Antonio refused to leave the country and was arrested. He was imprisoned for 17 days on a boat, then in Ushuaia for a month and later in Río Gallegos for two years. His properties were seized, and stolen with corrupted judges, by the military. In March 1957, with other Peronist leaders, he escaped from the prison and took refuge in Chile. He was able to fight off Argentine extradition appeals and eventually the government of Chile granted him asylum. In the following years, he lived in Cuba and then in Spain, where he lived for 20 years. Despite animosity from Perón's wife, Isabel, and the couple's chief of staff and fortune-teller, José López Rega, Antonio was a prominent adviser and financier of the exiled populist leader.

However, in the 1970s Antonio was displaced by José López Rega, and when Perón returned to his country and was re-elected to the Presidency in 1973, Antonio opted to stay in Madrid. Except for a short stay in July 1974, to attend the funeral of his mentor, Antonio did not return to Argentina until 1977.

He was also friend of Carlos Saúl Menem, under whose presidency he once again became an influential man in the Argentinian business world. He had introduced Menem, also the son of Syrians, to Perón in 1964, though Antonio later distanced himself from the colorful Menem, who abandoned much of the populist Peronist platform during his presidency, in the 1990s.

Antonio died in 2007, a few months short of his 90th birthday. He had five children with his first wife Esmeralda, and three more were adopted in Spain.

== Controversy ==
According to research by Gaby Weber and also according to his own statements, Jorge Antonio was involved in Nazi money laundering after 1945. In March 1944, Ludwig Erhard, head of the Institute for Industrial Research financed by the Reich Group of Industry, presented a "Program for the Processing of Post-War Economic Problems from the Standpoint of Industry," which stated: "The soldiers returning from the fronts must be accommodated, and an army of unemployed must be prevented. Huge amounts of capital will be needed to import food." In August 1944, important German industrialists, led by the director of Hermsdorf-Schomburg-Isolatoren-GmbH, Johann Friedrich Scheid, planned at the Maison Rouge hotel in Strasbourg how they could hide their fortunes through Swiss channels. This meeting was observed by the Deuxième Bureau, and the observations reached the US secret service in 1945. According to Gaby Weber's research, Juan Antonio was invited to Stuttgart in April 1950 by Daimler CEO Wilhelm Haspel to start the establishment of a new branch in Argentina with the help of funds that had been hidden before 1945. In 1951, together with the Argentine Central Bank, he helped to found Daimler-Benz Argentina. The money and also used machinery, which may have been hidden in Sweden, were contributed by the German side – partly disguised as loans from Switzerland – by surreptitious means, as German foreign investments were still officially prohibited. A network of straw men, accountants, authorized signatories and lawyers served this purpose. According to Weber, the legal basis for money laundering was the German-Argentine trade agreement negotiated with Economics Minister Ludwig Erhard in July 1950. In addition to Wilhelm Haspel, Fritz Könecke and Hanns-Martin Schleyer were involved in the transactions at Daimler-Benz. In total, it was probably about investments of 100 million US dollars. In the following years, Jorge Antonio also received large sums from other German industrial companies, such as Thyssen, Mannesmann, Klöckner, Korff, Siemens, Schering and Bayer. He was also involved in the re-establishment of the Argentinean Fahr S.A. in 1953 with Hans Kleiner as managing director. After the end of Jorge Antonio's career, Daimler reached an out-of-court settlement to get his property back in Argentina
