= National Directorate for Migration (Argentina) =

- Dirección Nacional de Migraciones
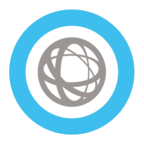

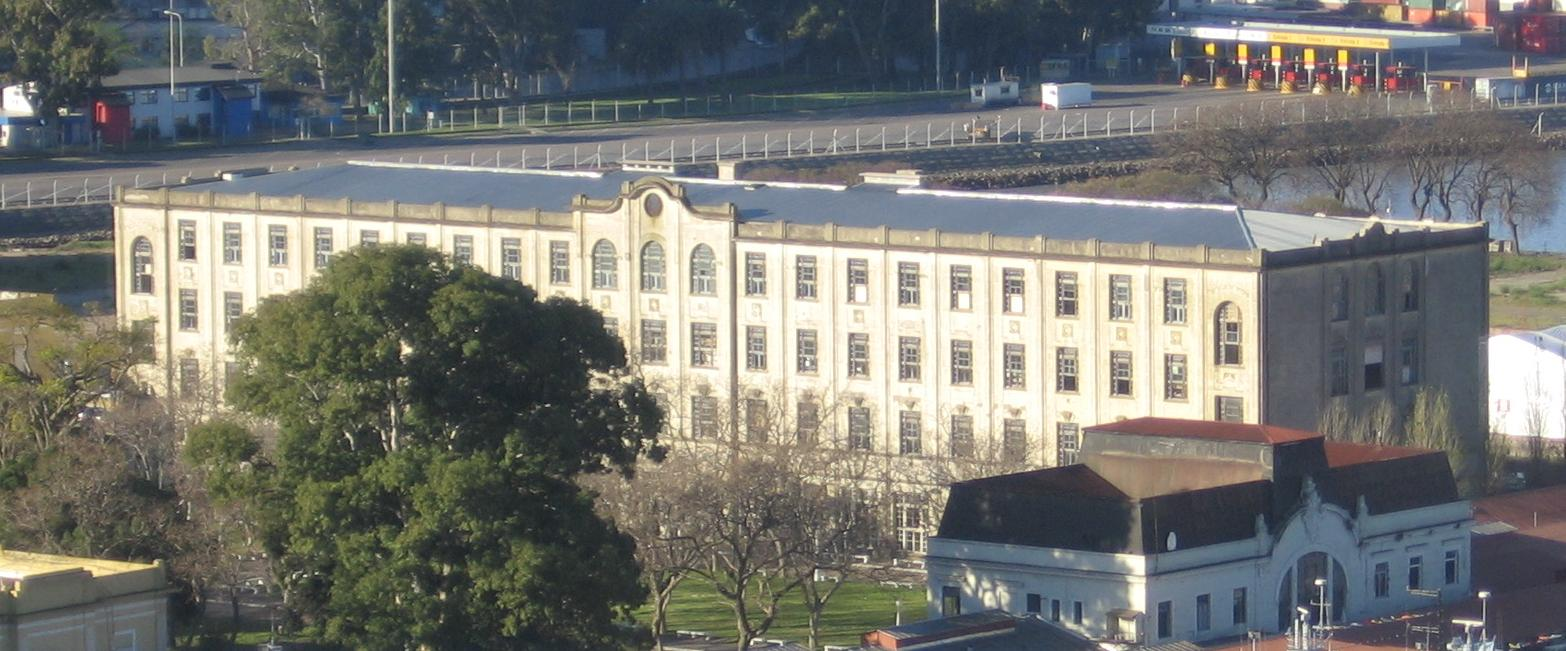
- DNM headquarters in Buenos Aires

Agency overview
- Formed: 1949; 76 years ago
- Preceding agency: Immigration Directorate
- Jurisdiction: Government of Argentina
- Headquarters: Hotel de Inmigrantes, Buenos Aires
- Annual budget: ARS 8,727 million (2021)
- Agency executive: Sebastián Seoane, Director
- Parent Secretariat: Secretariat of the Interior
- Website: argentina.gob.ar/migraciones

The National Directorate for Migration (Spanish: Dirección Nacional de Migraciones; DNM) is a decentralised agency of the Government of Argentina responding to the Secretariat of the Interior which is responsible for handling the country's migration policies.

It was created in 1949, during the first presidency of Juan Domingo Perón, to expand upon the responsibilities of the previously existing Immigration Directorate. It initially operated under the scope of the Secretariat of Labour.

Its headquarters are located in the Hotel de Inmigrantes complex, in the Retiro district of Buenos Aires. In the early 20th century, the Hotel de Inmigrantes served as the first stop for the millions of migrants coming to Argentina from Europe and Asia. Today, in addition to the DNM, the building houses two museums and a cultural centre.

== Structure and organisation ==
The DNM possesses jurisdiction throughout Argentina. In addition to its central headquarters and peripheral mobile units, it consists of 29 offices known as "delegations" (from the Spanish, delegaciones) and 7 additional migration offices. The mobile units are intended for express documentation and minor bureaucratic procedures. With the exception of Santa Fe Province, where the DNM delegation is located in Rosario (rather than its capital city of Santa Fe), delegations are positioned in each capital city, throughout the 23 provinces of Argentina. There are also delegations located in other major cities such as Comodoro Rivadavia, Bariloche, and Puerto Iguazú.

Chief tasks and responsibilities of the DNM include controlling the entry and departure of non-Argentine citizens to and from the Argentine territory, granting residency permits to immigrants, and standardising the documentation of immigrants in Argentina. The DNM consists of seven general directorates: Administration, Immigration, Migratory Movement, Systems and Information Technologies, Technical and Legal Affairs, Institutional and Social Affairs, as well as Migration Information, Analysis and Control.

== See also ==
- Immigration to Argentina
