= Immigrant's Festival =

Festival in Oberá, Misiones, Argentina

National Immigrant Festival
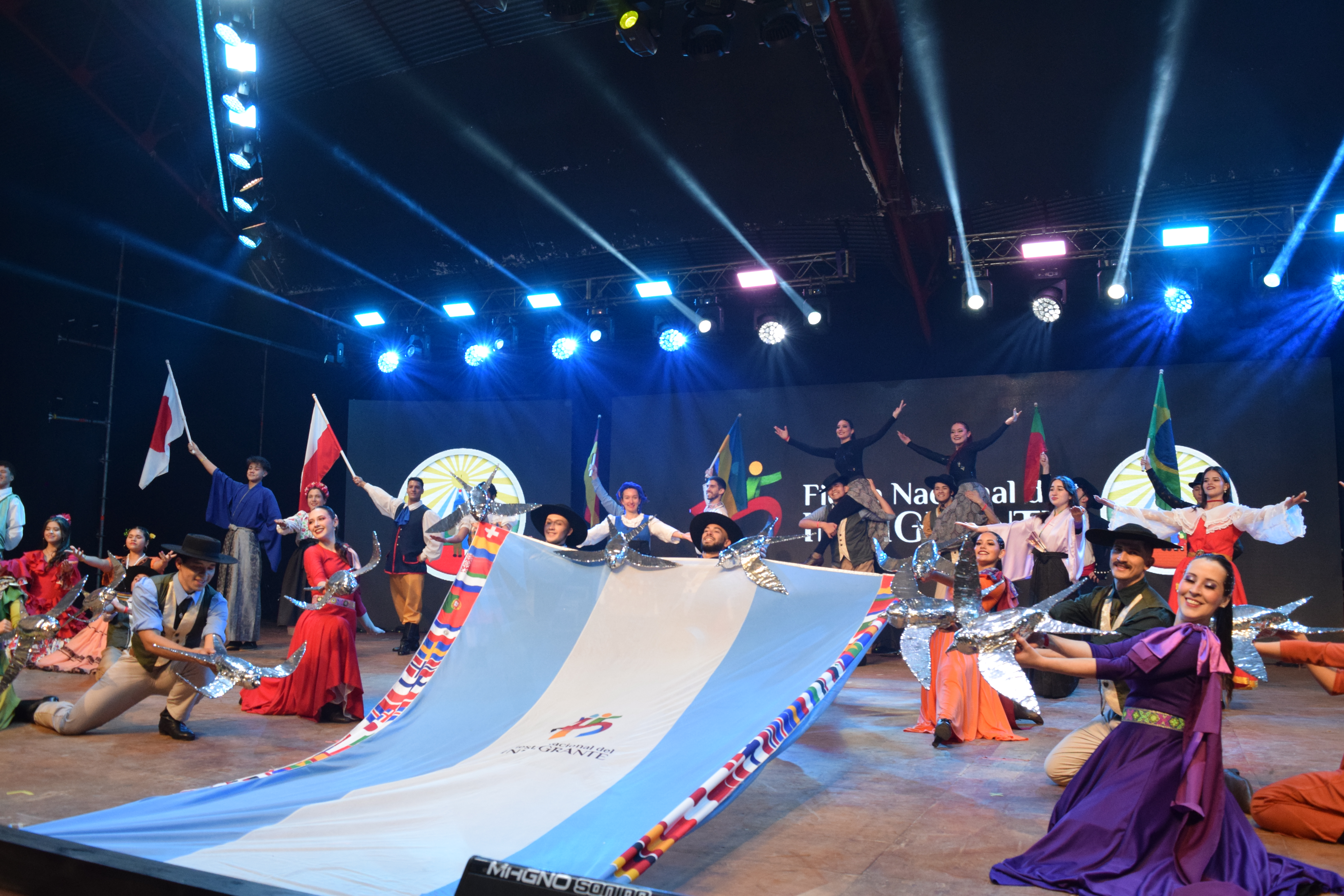
- Opening table in 2025
- Observed by: Oberá
- Type: Cultural
- Celebrations: Parades, music and dances
- Duration: First half of September
- Frequency: Annual
- Related to: Great European immigration

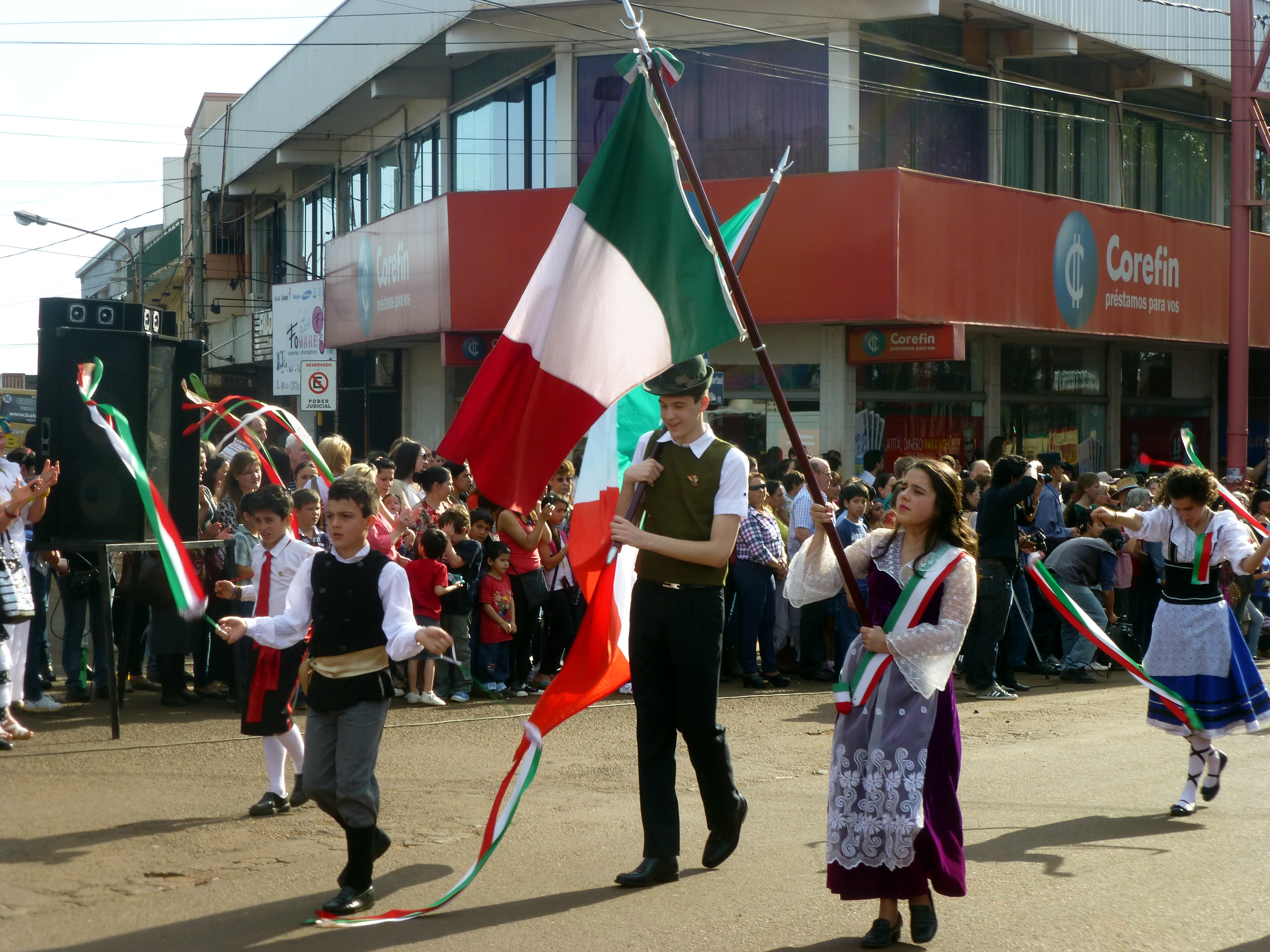
Italian Argentines performing during the celebrations.

The Immigrants' Festival ("Fiesta Nacional del Inmigrante") is celebrated in the city of Oberá, Misiones, in Argentina. The festival is aimed at collectively celebrating the diverse cultures that exist in Argentina and is held in honor of the customs, cultures, music, and cuisine of the country's different immigrant populations that have greatly enriched Argentina over time.

== History ==
First conceived in 1979, the annual National Celebration of the Immigrant has been organized since then by the Federación de Colectividades (a federation of various immigrant nationalities). Every year, the festival features new spectacles and the celebration attracts more than 120,000 visitors.

== Description ==
The annual festival takes place during the first fortnight of September at Parque de las Naciones ("Nation's Park"), an estate that consists of approximately 10 hectares (1,100,000 sq ft); each group is provided with its own house. During the week, social, cultural, sport, and recreational activities are carried out in a festive climate of coexistence. Villagers and visitors gather around tables tasting exquisite dishes and customs that are typical of the area's culture.

During the days of the celebration, artistic spectacles of an international standard are successively featured, including ballet groups. Within the same estate, the "Commercial Fair" shows the commercial, farming and industrial facets of the region, while the "Artisan Fair" displays a varied exhibition of high quality works that have been made by Argentine and foreign craftspeople.

One of the most important days of the festival is the election and coronation of the "National Queen of the Immigrant", where candidates who are the daughters and granddaughters of immigrants received votes from across the world.

French, German, Danish, Swedish, Finnish, Norwegian, Swiss, Icelandic, Italian, Polish, Russian, Ukrainian, Spanish, Japanese, Brazilian, Paraguayan, Arab (Lebanese and Syrian), and Peruvian collectivities were all represented at the 28th edition of the festival.

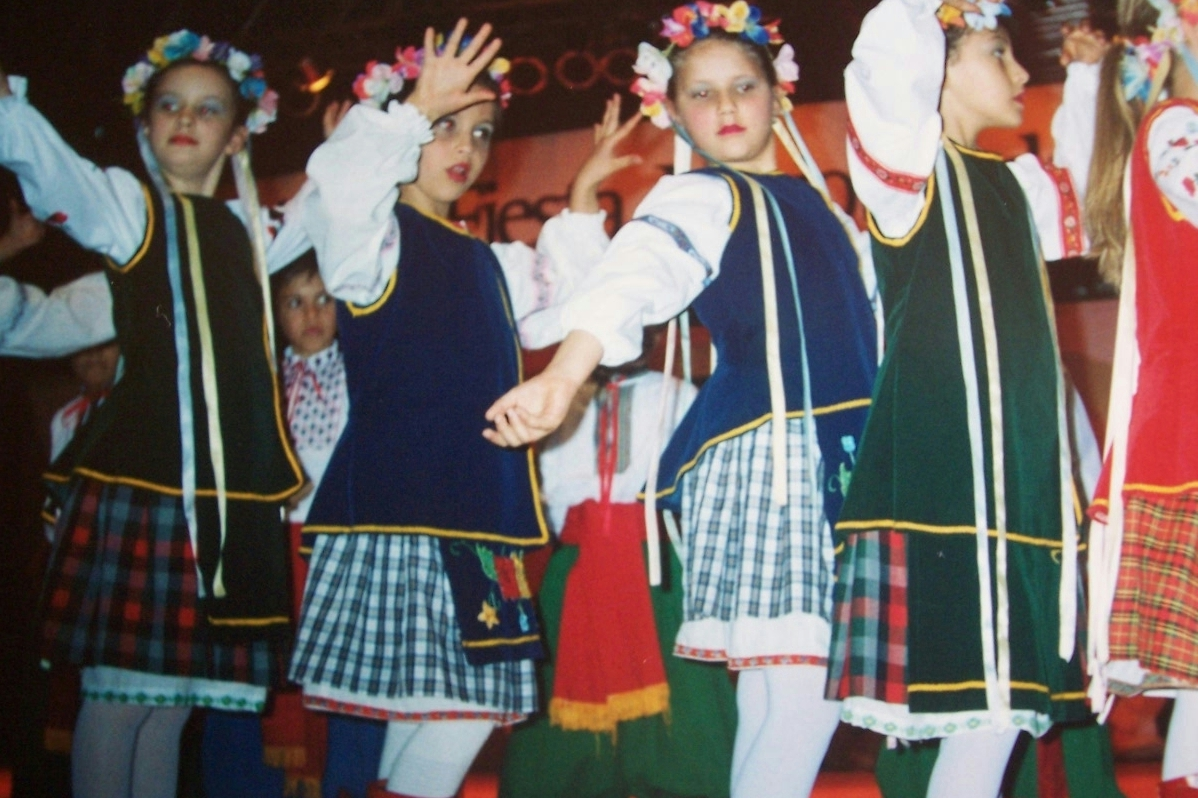
Ukrainian girls dancing

== 2005 edition ==
In 2005, between September 3 and 15, the 26th edition of the festival was held. The Czech community was new addition to that year's event and was assigned a space at the Parque de las Naciones.

As part of the 2005 spectacles, artists of national repute, such Árbol, Turf, Airbag, Memphis la Blusera, Soledad Pastorutti, and invited singers from neighbouring countries like Paraguay and Brazil will appear in the Norgus Jacob—such performances will be in addition to the ballet groups and the collectivities.

On Thursday, September 8, 2005, one of the following candidates from the different communities was selected as the "Queen" of the festival:

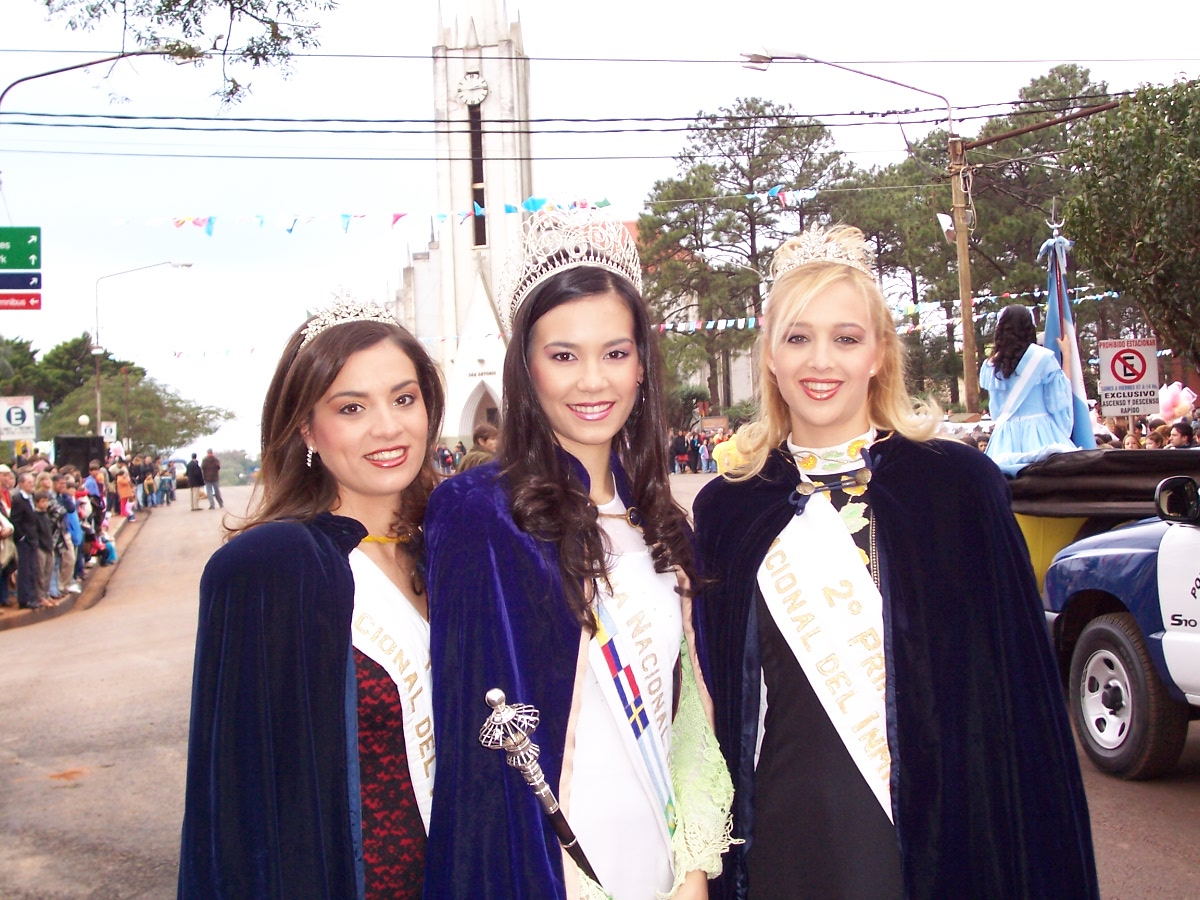
National Queen of the Immigrant (center), 1° princess (left) and 2° princess (right) from the year 2004, in the beginning of XXVII National Immigrant's Festival

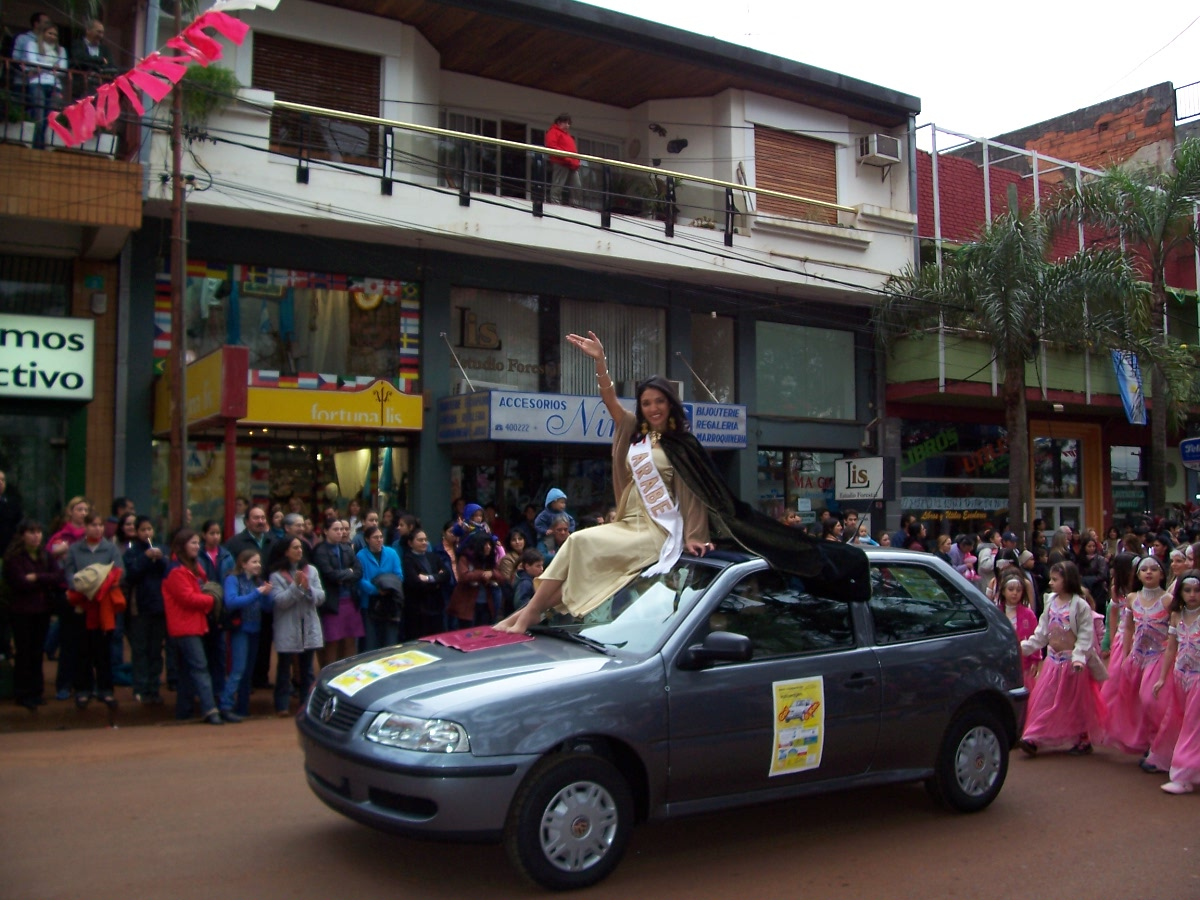
Rocío Chalup, Queen of the Arab Collectivity in the Fiesta Nacional del Inmigrante in Oberá, Misiones.

- Germany: Elianne Oswald
- Syria: Rocío Chalup Dew
- Brazil: Marcia Pizzutti
- Spain: Natalia Fernandez
- France: Valeria Vignolles
- Italy: Julian Sansaloni
- Nordic: Fanni Sand
- Paraguay: Lorene Britez
- Poland: Maria Sniechowski
- Russia: Noelia Bazila
- Switzerland: Marcela Christen
- Ukraine: Natalia Kornowski
- Japan: Débora Karasawa
- Czechoslovakia: Gabriela Iurinic

"The National Queen of the Immigrant" was chosen by a jury selected by the Federation of the Collectivities. Also, the newspaper, El Territorio, from Posadas, organizes the election of the "Virtual Queen of the Immigrant", in which everybody is given until 10:30 p.m. of the coronation day (Thursday) to choose one of the candidates—the results were released on the same Thursday night, immediately following the election of the National Queen, 1st and 2nd Princess, Miss Typical Cloth and Miss Friendship.

== 2007 edition ==
The 28th annual Immigrant's Festival opened with an inaugural parade. The parade involved more than fifteen collectivities dressed in traditional wardrobe—some of the participating nations were France, Germany, Denmark, Finland, Sweden, Iceland, Italy, Poland, Russia, Spain, Japan, Brazil, Paraguay, Arab, Peru, and Norway.

== See also ==
- Immigration to Argentina
- Encuentro y Fiesta Nacional de Colectividades
