= Inter-Cooperative Agricultural Confederation =

Argentine agricultural organisation

The Inter-Cooperative Agricultural Confederation (Spanish: Confederación Intercooperativa Agropecuaria, or CONIAGRO) is an Argentine organization that gathers several agricultural cooperatives around the country.

== History ==
The decade of the 1880s saw an increase in the agricultural economy of Argentina, thanks to the great European immigration wave to Argentina. The immigrants helped to build infrastructure, including granaries, roads, railways, and ports. The first cooperative, "El Progreso Agrícola", was established in 1898, in the south of the Buenos Aires province. Several French immigrants united to seek ways to counter the risk of hail to agriculture. Several other cooperatives followed in different regions of the country, focused on the needs of each region.

The cooperatives then organized in federations that represented the interests of several cooperatives. The "Confederación Entrerriana de Cooperativas," in the Entre Ríos Province, was the first provincial federation, established in 1913. The first national organization was the "Consejo Intercooperativo Agrario de Coordinación y Arbitraje", established in 1953, during the presidency of Juan Perón. Other cooperatives that were not part of it joined it in 1958.

Nowadays, there are nearly a thousand cooperatives, organized in more than a dozen second-level federations. Their combined annual exports grow to almost 3,000 million Argentine pesos.

== Bibliography ==
- Basombrío, Bernardo (2009). No, Positivo. Argentina: El Cencerro Editora. ISBN 978-987-05-6445-4.
