= Immigration to Argentina =

Migration origin

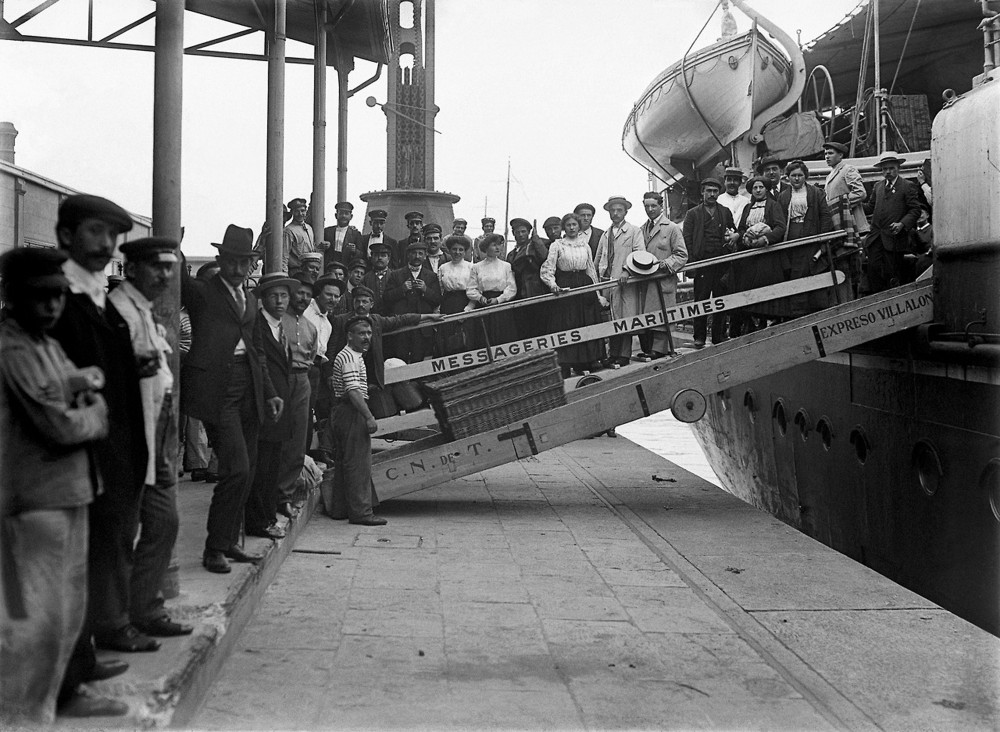
Massive European and Levantine immigration to Argentina, late 19th century

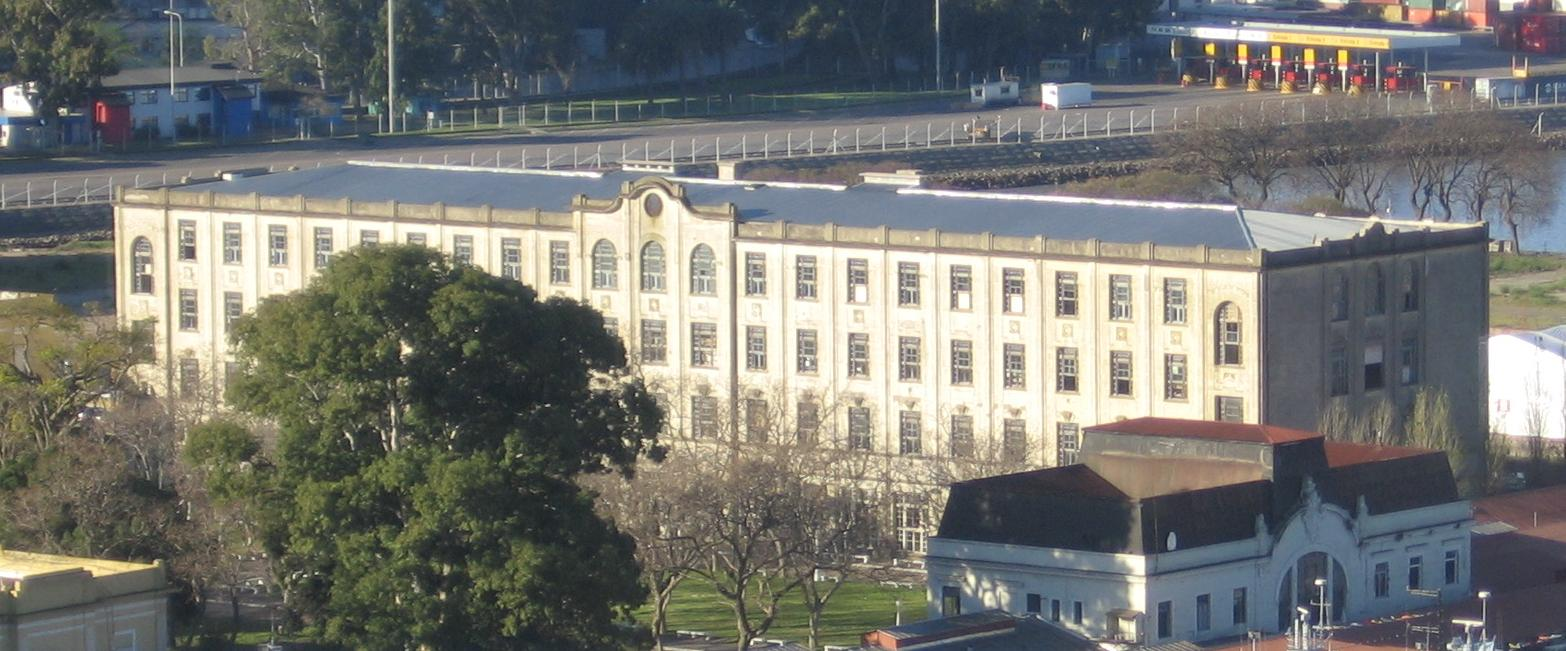
Hotel de Inmigrantes, Buenos Aires. Built in 1906, it could accommodate up to 4,000.

The history of immigration to Argentina can be divided into several major stages:

- Spanish colonization between the 16th and 18th century, mostly male, largely assimilated with the natives through a process called miscegenation. Although, not all of the current territory was effectively colonized by the Spaniards. The Chaco region, Eastern Patagonia, the current province of La Pampa, the south zone of Córdoba, and the major part of the current provinces of Buenos Aires, San Luis, and Mendoza were maintained under indigenous dominance—Guaycurúes and Wichís from the Chaco region; Huarpes in the Cuyana and north Neuquino; Ranqueles in the east of Cuyo and north from the Pampean region; Tehuelches and Mapuches in the Pampean and Patagonian regions, and Selknam and Yámanas in de Tierra del Fuego archipelago—which were taken over by the Mapuches; first to the east of Cordillera de los Andes, mixing interracially with the Pehuenches in the middle of the 18th century and continuing until 1830 with the indigenous Pampas and north from Patagonia, which were conquered by the Argentine State after its independence.
- The African population, forcibly introduced from sub-Saharan Africa (mainly of Bantu origin), taken to work as slaves in the colony between the 17th and 19th centuries in great numbers.
- Immigration mostly European and to a lesser extent from Western Asia, including considerable Arab and Jewish currents, produced between the end of the 19th century and the first half of the 20th century (particularly Italians and Spaniards in that quantitative order), promoted by the Constitution of 1852 that prohibited establishing limitations to enter the country to those "strangers that bring through the purpose of working the land, bettering the industries, and introducing and teaching the sciences and the arts" and order the State to promote "European" immigration, even though after predomination of Mediterranean immigrants, from Eastern Europe and the western Asia. Added to this is the Alberdian precept of "to govern is to populate." These politics were destined to generate a rural social fabric and to finalize the occupation of the Pampean, Patagonian, and Chaco territories, that until the 1880s, were inhabited by diverse indigenous cultures.
- European immigration in the 19th century and early 20th century (mainly Italian and Spanish), focused on colonization and sponsored by the government (sometimes on lands conquered from the native inhabitants by the Conquest of the Desert in the last quarter of the century).
- The immigration from nearby countries (Uruguay, Chile, Brazil, Bolivia, and Paraguay) from the 19th to 21st century. These immigration streams date back to the first agro-pottery civilizations that appeared in Argentine territory.
- From the 1980s and 1990s, the migration currents especially come from Chile, Paraguay, Bolivia, Peru, Asia (particularly from Korea, China, and Japan in this period) and Eastern Europe.
- During the 21st century, a part of Argentine migrants and their descendants returned from Europe and the United States. In addition, immigrants from Bolivia, Paraguay, and Peru; now there are also migratory streams from China, Brazil, Colombia, Cuba, Venezuela, Senegal, Ecuador, Dominican Republic, and Haiti.
- Mostly urban immigration during the era of rapid growth in the late 19th century (from 1880 onwards) and the first half of the 20th century, before and after World War I and also after the Spanish Civil War.

== History ==
=== Colonial era ===
The Spanish migration flows which conquered and colonised the area that is now Argentina were mainly three:

- The one which came from the northwest — those Peruvian lands conquered by Diego de Almagro and Francisco Pizarro — being the cities of Lima, Cusco and Potosí the scattering centres.
- The one which came from the west, from Chile, across the Andes; from the cities of Santiago and Coquimbo.
- The one which came from the east, that used the Río de la Plata and its tributaries, especially the Paraná River to settle on the banks thereof. Also, this migration flow settled in Asunción, Paraguay where they colonised much of the region.

The Spanish conquistadores and settlers were mainly from Biscay, as well from Galicia and Portugal, founding cities and establishing estancias for supplies of agricultural and livestock products. The scale of operations was reduced, mainly focused on the domestic market and the provision of the crown.

Another important population center were the cities of Asunción del Paraguay and Corrientes, founded in the area of the Guaraní people, and with important ports on navigable rivers. At the same time, Andean migration from Chile settled in San Juan and Mendoza.

Later, with the rise of smuggling and the multiplication without human intervention of wild cattle on the Pampean plains, Buenos Aires and other cities on the Mesopotamian coast began to boom.

The exact number of Hispanic migrants to the Americas is difficult to determine, due to the fragmentary nature of the sources available to date. However, there are several estimates based on different sources and calculations. In any case, their percentages were low with respect to the total population, around 1–2%, in no case exceeding 5%.

The Argentine government reports that in 1810, about 6,000 peninsular Spaniards lived in the territory of the United Provinces of the Río de la Plata, out of a total population of between 500–700,000 inhabitants, representing approximately 1% of the population.

The indigenous population decreased drastically in a very short period of time, both because of the deaths caused by the conquest and the contagion of diseases -such as smallpox- hitherto unknown in the continent, and because of the heavy cost in human lives of the mining operations in the Andean region; The exact figures are unknown, and it is probably impossible to establish them reliably, but most studies agree that this was one of the main features of the demographic catastrophe in America after the arrival of the Europeans, although the rest was linked to the Hispanic or Creole element.

During the colonial period, the current Argentine territory was also populated by indigenous peoples, who remained independent from the dominion of the Spanish Empire, in the Chaqueña region, the Pampean plains, the Altiplano and Patagonia.

== Support and control of immigration ==
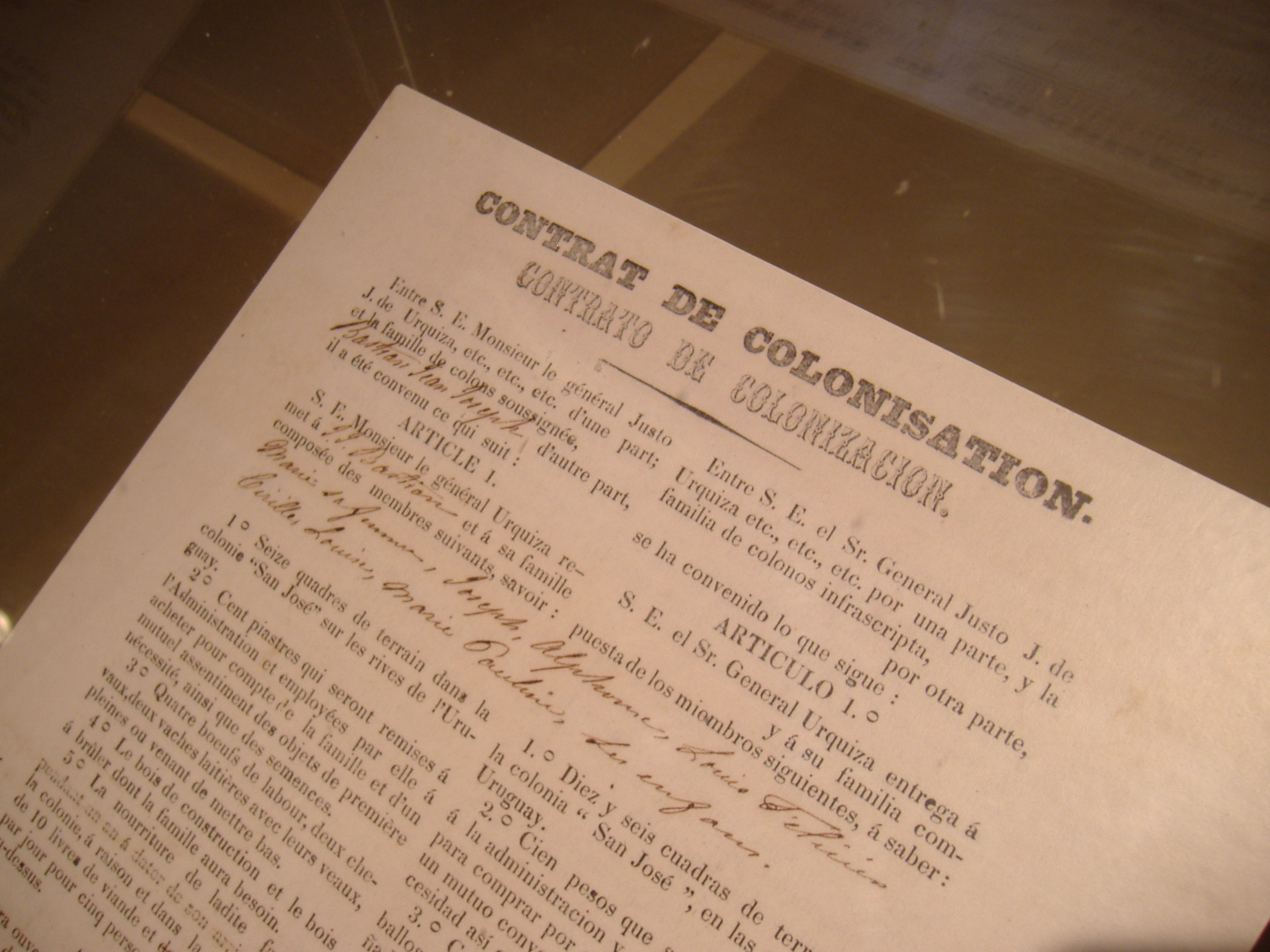
Copy of a colonization contract in the history museum of San José, Entre Ríos

Since its unification as a country, Argentine rulers intended the country to welcome immigration. Article 25 of the 1853 Constitution reads:

The Federal Government will encourage European immigration, and it will not restrict, limit or burden with any taxes the entrance into Argentine territory of foreigners who come with the goal of working the land, improving the industries and teach the sciences and the arts.

The Preamble of the Constitution dictates a number of goals (justice, peace, defence, welfare and liberty) that apply "to all men in the world who wish to dwell on Argentine soil". The Constitution incorporates, along with other influences, the thought of Juan Bautista Alberdi, who expressed his opinion on the matter in succinct terms: "to govern is to populate".

As a result of policies promoting immigration to the once sparsely populated country 11% of the Argentinian population and 50% of the population of Buenos Aires was made up of newly arrived immigrants by 1869.

The legal and organisational precedents of today's National Directorate for Migration (DNM) can be found in 1825, when Rivadavia created an Immigration Commission. After the commission was dissolved, the government of Rosas continued to allow immigration. Urquiza, under whose sponsorship the Constitution was drawn, encouraged the establishment of agricultural colonies in the Littoral (western Mesopotamia and north-eastern Pampas).

The first law dealing with immigration policies was Law 817 of Immigration and Colonization, of 1876. The General Immigration Office was created in 1898, together with the Hotel de Inmigrantes (Immigrants' Hotel), in Buenos Aires.

The liberal rulers of the late 19th century saw immigration as the possibility of bringing people from supposedly more civilised, enlightened countries into a sparsely populated land, thus diminishing the influence of aboriginal elements and turning Argentina into a modern society with a dynamic economy. These politicians and intellectuals favored northern European immigration in particular. However, immigrants did not bring only their knowledge and skills.

In 1902, a Law of Residence (Ley de Residencia) was passed, mandating the expulsion of foreigners who "compromise national security or disturb public order", and, in 1910, a Law of Social Defence (Ley de Defensa Social) explicitly named ideologies deemed to have such effects. These laws were a reaction by the ruling elite against imported ideas such as labor unionism, anarchism and other forms of popular organisation.

The modern National Directorate for Migration was created by decree on 4 February 1949, under the Technical Secretariat of the Presidency, in order to deal with the new post-war immigration scenario. New regulations were added to the Directorate by Law 22439 of 1981 and a decree of 1994, but the current regulations are the Law 25871 of 2004 and the decree 616 of 2010.

== Features of immigration ==
Immigrants by provinces and territories in Argentina according to the 1914 census (almost all Europeans and Levantines)

Nationality of people in Argentina by the 1895 census (Naturalized immigrants are considered Argentine).
1. Argentine (74.6%)
2. Italian (12.5%)
3. Spanish (5.02%)
4. French (2.38%)
5. Uruguayan (1.23%)
6. Others (4.31%)

The majority of immigrants, since the 19th century, have come from Europe, mostly from Italy and Spain. Also notable were Jewish immigrants escaping persecution, giving Argentina the highest Jewish population in Latin America, and the 7th in all the world. The total population of Argentina rose from 4 million in 1895 to 7.9 million in 1914, and to 15.8 million in 1947; during this time the country was settled by 1.5 million Spaniards and 3.8 million Italians between 1861 and 1920 but not all remained. Also arrived were Poles, Russians, French (more than 100,000 each), Germans and Austrians (also more than 100,000), Portuguese, Greeks, Ukrainians, Croats, Czechs, Irish, British, Swiss, Dutch, Hungarians, Scandinavians (the vast majority being Danes), and people from other European and Middle Eastern countries, prominently Syria, Lebanon, Israel, Palestine, Egypt, Armenia, Georgia, and Turkey. These trends made Argentina the country with the second-largest number of immigrants, with 8 million, second only to the United States with 27 million. In addition, Argentine immigrant documents also show immigrants from Canada, Australia, South Africa and The United States arriving in Argentina.

Most immigrants arrived through the port of Buenos Aires and stayed in the capital or within Buenos Aires Province, as it still happens today. In 1895, immigrants accounted for 52% of the population in the Capital, and 31% in the province of Buenos Aires (some provinces of the littoral, such as Santa Fe, had about 40%, and the Patagonian provinces about 50%). In 1914, before World War I caused many European immigrants to return to their homeland in order to join the respective armies, the overall rate of foreign-born population reached its peak, almost 30%.

A significant number of immigrants settled in the countryside in the interior of the country, especially the littoral provinces, creating agricultural colonies. These included many Jews, fleeing pogroms in Europe and sponsored by Maurice de Hirsch's Jewish Colonization Association; they were later termed "Jewish gauchos". The first such Jewish colony was Moïseville (now the village of Moisés Ville). Through most of the 20th century, Argentina held one of the largest Jewish communities (near 500,000) after the US, France, Israel and Russia, and by far the largest in Latin America (see History of the Jews in Argentina). Argentina is home to a large community from the Arab world, made up mostly of immigrants from Syria, Lebanon, Palestine, Israel, Jordan, Egypt, Armenia, Georgia, and Turkey. Most are Christians of the Eastern Orthodox and Eastern Catholic (Maronite) Churches, with smaller Muslim, Jewish and Druze minorities. Many have gained prominent status in national business and politics, including former president Carlos Menem, the son of Syrian settlers from the province of La Rioja. (see Arab Argentine).

Nationalities settled in particular areas of the country, such as Irish in Formosa and the Mesopotamia region, the Ukrainians in Misiones where they constitute approximately 9% of the population.

Well-known and culturally strong are the German-speaking communities such as those of German-descendants themselves (both those from Germany itself, and those ethnic Germans from other parts of Europe, such as Volga Germans), Austrian, and Swiss ones. Strong German-descendant populations can be found in the Mesopotamia region (especially Entre Ríos and Misiones provinces), many neighborhoods in Buenos Aires city (such as Belgrano or Palermo), the Buenos Aires Province itself (strong German settlement in Coronel Suárez, Tornquist and other areas), Córdoba (the Oktoberfest celebration in Villa General Belgrano is specially famous) and all along the Patagonian region, including important cities such as San Carlos de Bariloche (an important tourist spot near the Andes mountain chain, which was especially influenced by German settlements).

The South African Boers Patagonia houses a unique community of South African Boers who settled there after the Second Boer War against the United Kingdom, which ended in 1902. Between 1903 and 1909, up to 800 Boer families trekked by ship to this lonely spot on Argentina's east coast, about 1500 km north of Tierra del Fuego. There are an estimated 100–120 Boer families still living on the land assigned to them by General Julio Roca. They are mainly an agricultural community.

Other nationalities, such as Spaniards, although they have specific localities (such as the centre of Buenos Aires), they are more uniformly present all around the country and form the general background of Argentine population today.

European immigration to Argentina (1870–1914)
Origin	1857–1859	1860–1869	1870–1879	1880–1889	1890–1899	1900–1909	1910–1919	1920–1929	1930–1931	1940–1949	1950–1959
Belgium	68	518	628	15,096	2,694	2,931	2,193	—	—	—	—
Switzerland	219	1,562	6,203	11,569	4,875	4,793	4,578	—	—	—	—
Denmark	—	—	303	1,128	1,282	3,437	4,576	—	—	—	—
France	720	6,360	32,938	79,422	41,048	37,340	25,258	—	—	—	—
Germany	178	1,212	3,522	12,958	9,204	20,064	22,148	60,130	—	1	66,327
Italy	9,006 3,979 5,027	93,602 51,695 41,997	156,716 110,994 45,722	472,179 98,655 373,524	411,764 374,745 37,019	848,533 318,841 529,692	712,310 459,930 252,380	—	—	—	—
Netherlands	37	111	111	4,315	675	1,622	1,264	—	—	—	—
Spain	2,440	20,602	44,802	148,398	114,731	672,941	598,098	—	—	—	—
Sweden	—	—	186	632	490	592	508	441	—	—	—
United Kingdom	359	2,708	9,265	15,692	4,691	13,186	13,560	—	—	—	—
Russia	80	407	464	4,155	15,665	73,845	48,002	—	—	—	—
Austria-Hungary	226	819	3,469	16,479	8,681	39,814	18,798	—	—	—	—
Ottoman Empire	—	—	672	3,537	11,583	66,558	59,272	—	—	—	—
Portugal	88	432	656	1,852	1,612	10,418	17,570	23,406	10,310	4,230	12,033
United States	—	—	819	1,200	777	2,640	2,631	—	—	—	—

Proportion of foreign Europeans in each department as of the 1869 census.

Proportion of foreign Europeans in each department as of the 1895 census.

Proportion of foreign Europeans in each department as of the 1914 census.

Proportion of foreign Europeans in each department as of the 1947 census.

=== Origin of the immigrants between 1857 and 1920 ===
Net immigration by nationality (1857–1920)
Subjecthood or citizenship	Number of immigrants	Percentage of total
Italy	2,341,126	44.72%
Spain	1,602,752	30.61%
France	221,074	4.22%
Russian Empire ^{(1)}	163,862	3.13%
Ottoman Empire	141,622	2.71%
Austria-Hungary ^{(2)}	87,266	1.67%
German Empire	69,896	1.34%
United Kingdom ^{(3)}	60,477	1.16%
Switzerland	34,525	0.66%
Portugal	30,729	0.59%
Belgium	23,549	0.45%
Denmark	10,644	0.20%
Netherlands	8,111	0.15%
United States	8,067	0.15%
Sweden	2,223	0.04%
Luxembourg^{(4)}	1,000	0.02%
Others	428,471	8.18%
Total	5,235,394	

Notes:

(1) This figure includes Russians, Ukrainians, Volga Germans, Belarusians, Poles, Lithuanians, etc. that entered Argentina with passport of the Russian Empire.
(2) This figure includes all the peoples that lived within the boundaries of the Austro-Hungarian Empire between 1867 and 1918: Austrians, Hungarians, Czechs, Slovaks, Slovenians, Croatians, Bosniaks, Ruthenians and people from the regions of Vojvodina in Serbia, Trentino-Alto Adige/Südtirol and Trieste in Italy, Transylvania in Romania, and Galicia in Poland.
(3) The United Kingdom included Ireland until 1922; that is why most of the British immigrants – nicknamed "ingleses" – were in fact Irish, Welsh and Scottish.
(4) Around 0.5% of Luxembourg's total population emigrated to Argentina during the 1880s.

Source: Dirección Nacional de Migraciones: Infografías., that information was modified – figures there are by nationality, not by country.

=== Origin of the immigrants between 1857 and 1940 ===
Immigration by nationality (1857–1940)
Subjecthood or citizenship	Number of immigrants	Percentage of total
Italy	3,500,000	43.22%
Spain	2,200,000	27.17%
France	400,000	4.94%
Poland	220,000	2.72%
Russia	200,000	2.47%
Ottoman Empire	200,000	2.47%
Austro-Hungarian	150,000	1.85%
United Kingdom	140,000	1.73%
Germany	100,000	1.23%
Portugal	100,000	1.23%
Yugoslavia	80,000	0.99%
Switzerland	68,000	0.84%
Belgium	50,000	0.62%
Denmark	20,000	0.25%
United States	12,000	0.15%
Netherlands	10,000	0.12%
Sweden	7,000	0.09%
Others	223,000	2.75%
Total (Note: About 52% of immigrants in the period 1857–1939 were definitively settled.)	8,098,000	94.84%

Source: "South American Immigration: Argentina", Wanda A. Velez, 1990

== Legacy of immigration ==
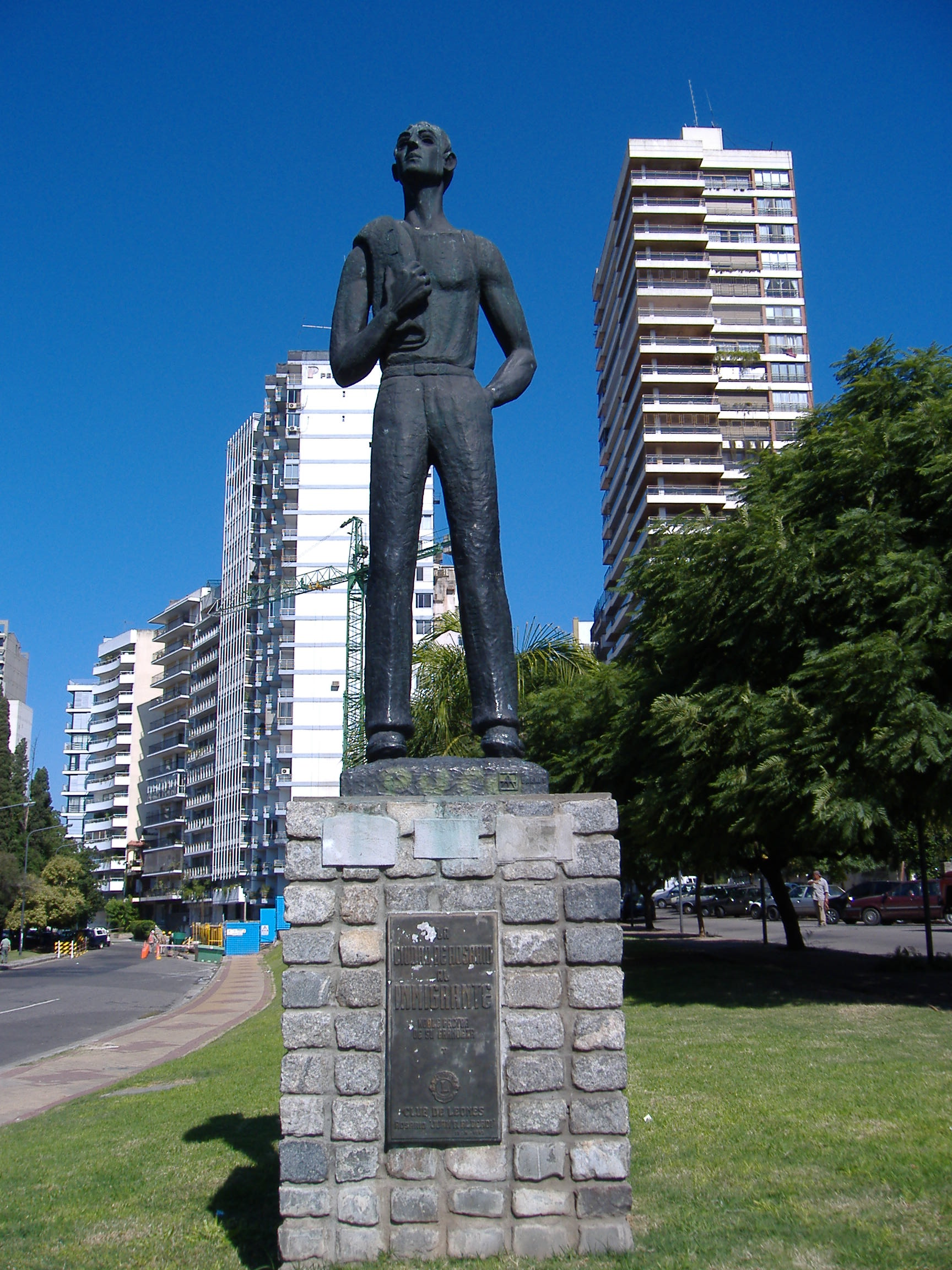
A statue honoring the immigrants, in Rosario

Argentine popular culture, especially in the Río de la Plata basin, was heavily marked by Italian and Spanish immigration.

Post-independence politicians tried to steer Argentina consistently away from identification with monarchical Spain, perceived as backward and ultraconservative, towards relatively progressive national models like those of France or the United States. Millions of poor peasants from Galicia arriving in Argentina not only did little to alter this position but also immigrated to Argentina because of it, steering clear of the United States and Britain.

Lunfardo, the jargon enshrined in tango lyrics, is laden with Italianisms, often also found in the mainstream colloquial dialect (Rioplatense Spanish). Common dishes in the central area of the country (milanesa, fainá, polenta, pascualina) have Italian names and origins.

Immigrant communities have given Buenos Aires some of its most famous landmarks, such as the Torre de los Ingleses (Tower of the English) or the Monumento de los Españoles (Monument of the Spaniards). Ukrainians, Armenians, Swiss, and many others built monuments and churches at popular spots throughout the capital.

Argentina celebrates Immigrant's Day on 4 September since 1949, by a decree of the Executive Branch. The National Immigrant's Festival is celebrated in Oberá, Misiones, during the first fortnight of September, since 1980. There are other celebrations of ethnic diversity throughout the country, such as the National Meeting and Festival of the Communities in Rosario (typically at the beginning of November). Many cities and towns in Argentina also feature monuments and memorials dedicated to immigration. There are also Immigrant's Festivals (or Collectivities Festivals) throughout the country, for example: Córdoba, Bariloche, Berisso, Esperanza, Venado Tuerto, and Comodoro Rivadavia have their own Immigrant's festivals. These festivals tend to be local, and they are not advertised or promoted nationally like the festivals in Rosario and Oberá.

== Immigration in recent times ==
Besides substantial immigration from neighboring countries during the middle and late 1990s, Argentina received significant numbers of people from Asian countries such as Korea (both North and South), China, Vietnam, Cambodia, and Japan who joined the previously existing Sino-Japanese communities in Buenos Aires. Despite the economic and financial crisis Argentina suffered at the start of the 21st century, people from all over the world continued arriving to the country, because of Argentina's immigration-friendly policies and high standard of living.

According to official data, between 1992 and 2003 an average of 13,187 people per year immigrated legally into Argentina. The government calculates that 504,000 people entered the country during the same period, giving about 345,000 undocumented immigrants. The same source gives a plausible total figure of 750,000 undocumented immigrants currently residing in Argentina.

From 2004 onwards, after Immigration Law 25871 was sanctioned, which makes the State responsible for guaranteeing access to health and education for immigrants, many foreigners have chosen Buenos Aires as their destination to work or study. Between 2006–2008 and 2012–2013 a relatively large group of Senegal nationals (4500 in total) have immigrated to Argentina, 90 percent of which have refugee status.

In April 2006, the national government started the Patria Grande plan to regularize the migratory situation of undocumented immigrants. The plan attempts to ease the bureaucratic process of getting documentation and residence papers, and is aimed at citizens of Mercosur countries and its associated states (Bolivia, Brazil, Chile, Colombia, Ecuador, Paraguay, Peru, Uruguay and Venezuela). The plan came after a scandal and a wave of indignation caused by fire in a Buenos Aires sweatshop, which revealed the widespread utilization of undocumented Bolivian immigrants as cheap labor force in inhumane conditions, under a regime of virtual debt slavery.

As of 2020, Argentina counted with a positive net migration rate (one of the only three such countries in the region, alongside Chile and Costa Rica) and remains a major destination for migrants within Latin America and the Caribbean.

However, since the start of the Russian invasion of Ukraine in 2022, in light of the international sanctions on Russian passports, Russian couples and pregnant Russian women have started to emigrate to Argentina in hopes of acquiring an Argentine passport in order to continue their journey onto Europe, or to permanently establish themselves in Argentina with their children. As of July 2023, more than 18,500 Russians have come to Argentina after Russia invaded Ukraine. Argentina does not require a visa for Russian citizens to enter the country as tourists and it also allows the parents of children born on Argentinian soil to receive residency, and, later, a passport. This opportunity has led to approximately 10,500 Russians travelling to Argentina to give birth in 2022.

== Country of birth of Argentine residents ==
Proportion of foreign South Americans in each department as of the 2022 census.

Immigrants by continent in 2022
1. America (81.1%)
2. Europe (7.50%)
3. Asia (1.90%)
4. Africa and Oceania (0.20%)
5. Unknown (9.30%)

According to the National Institute of Statistics and Census of Argentina, in 2022 a total of 1,933,463 of the Argentine resident population were born outside Argentina, representing 4.24% of the total Argentine resident population.

Place	Country	2022	2010	2001	1991
1	Paraguay	522,598	550,713	325,046	254,115
2	Bolivia	338,299	345,272	233,464	145,670
3	Venezuela	161,495	6,379	2,774	1,934
4	Peru	156,251	157,514	88,260	15,939
5	Chile	149,082	191,147	212,429	247,987
6	Uruguay	95,384	116,592	117,564	135,406
7	Italy	68,169	147,499	216,718	356,923
8	Brazil	49,943	41,330	34,712	33,966
9	Spain	48,492	94,030	134,417	244,212
10	Colombia	46,482	17,576	3,876	2,638
11	China	18,629	8,929	4,184	2,297
12	United States	13,986	19,147	10,552	9,755
13	Ecuador	8,879	4,820	2,125	975
14	Dominican Republic	7,817	5,661	1,497	259
15	Mexico	5,833	6,042	3,323	2,277
16	South Korea	5,337	7,321	8,290	8,371
17	Germany	4,087	8,416	10,362	15,451
18	France	3,960	6,995	6,578	6,309
19	Cuba	3,921	3,461	2,457	1,393
20	Ukraine	3,486	4,830	8,290	3,498
21	Portugal	3,281	6,785	9,340	13,229
22	Taiwan	3,018	2,875	3,511	1,870
23	Japan	2,703	4,036	4,753	5,674
24	Russia	2,169	2,696	4,083	6,529
25	United Kingdom	1,840	3,029	2,418	2,334
26	Haiti	1,524	309	88	73
27	Poland	1,408	6,428	13,703	28,811
28	Israel	1,394	1,716	1,253	1,431
29	Canada	1,377	2,062	1,263	777
30	Syria	1,324	1,337	2,350	4,814
	Other / Unknown	201,295	31,010	62,260	73,293
TOTAL		1,933,463	1,805,957	1,531,940	1,628,210

Immigrant population pyramid by nationality in 2022 (not counting descendants)

Paraguayans: 522,598

Bolivians: 338,299

Venezuelans: 161,495

Peruvians: 156,251

Uruguayans: 95,384

Italians: 68,169

Spaniards: 48,492

Americans: 13,986

Ukrainians: 3,486

Senegalese: 1,120

== See also ==
- Demographics of Argentina
- Great European immigration wave to Argentina
- Immigration to Uruguay
- National Directorate for Migration (Argentina)

=== Immigrant communities in Argentina ===
- Afro Argentines
- Arab Argentines
- Argentines of European descent
- Asian Argentines
- Austrian Argentines
- Bulgarians in South America
- Chinese Argentines
- Dutch Argentines
- English settlement in Argentina
- French Argentines
- German Argentines
- Greek Argentines
- Hungarian Argentines
- Irish Argentine
- Italian Argentine
- History of the Jews in Argentina (Jewish gauchos)
- Koreans in Argentina
- Polish Argentines
- Portuguese Argentine
- Russian Argentines
- Scottish Argentines
- Slovene Argentines
- Swedish Argentines
- Swiss Argentines
