= Hotel de Inmigrantes =

Defunct immigration hotel in Buenos Aires, Argentina

Immigrants' Hotel
- Hotel de Inmigrantes (Spanish)
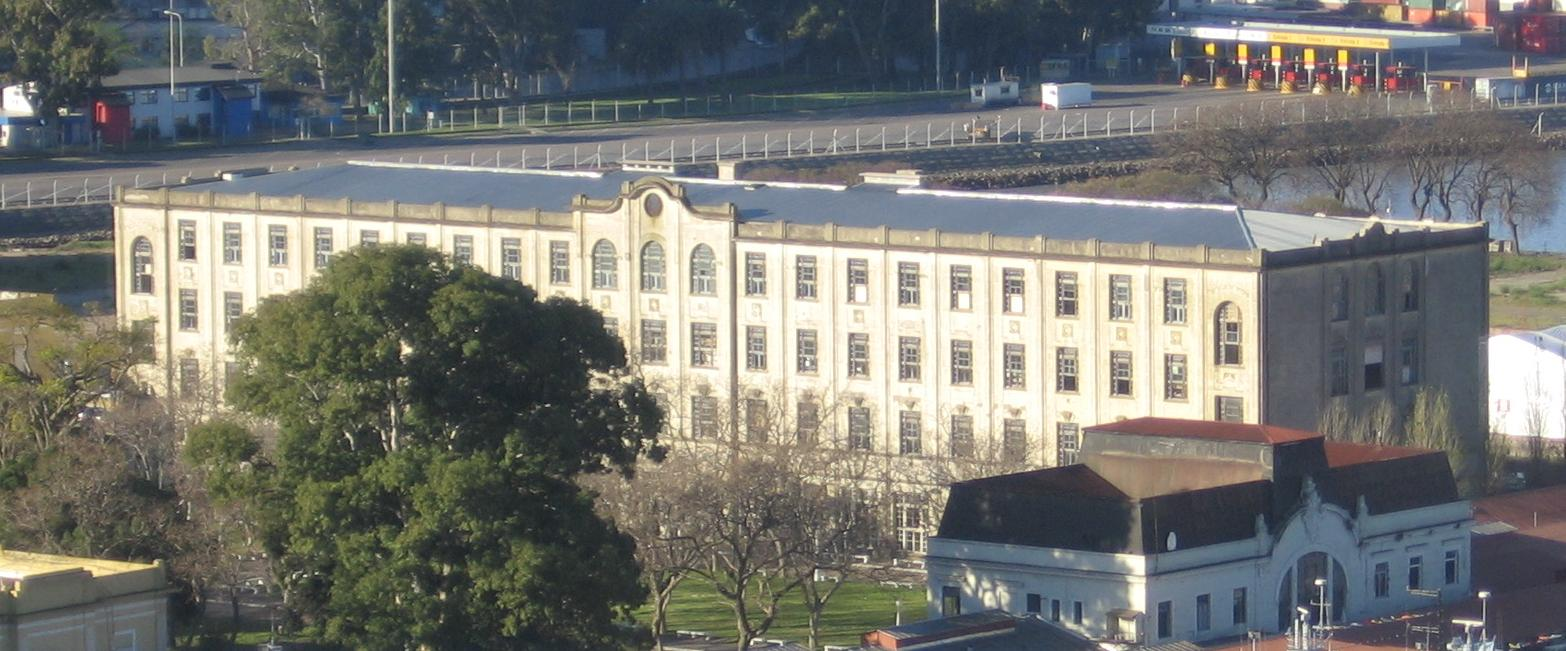
- The building in 2006
- Interactive map of the Immigrants' Hotel area

General information
- Status: Defunct
- Type: Citadel
- Location: Av. Antártida Argentina 1335, Buenos Aires, Argentina
- Coordinates: 34°35′32.16″S 58°22′5.12″W
- Current tenants: National Museum of Immigration
- Construction started: 1905
- Construction stopped: 1909
- Completed: 1911
- Closed: 1953; 73 years ago
- Owner: The City of Buenos Aires
- Operator: Government of Buenos Aires

Technical details
- Material: Reinforced concrete
- Size: 90 metres (300 ft) x 26 metres (85 ft)
- Floor count: 4

Design and construction
- Architect: Juan Kronfuss (1909-1911)
- Architecture firm: Udina & Mosca (1905-1909); Wayss & Freytag (1909-1911)
- Developer: Guillermo Wilcken
- Designations: National Historic Monument

Website
- Official website

Hotel de Inmigrantes (Immigrants' Hotel) is a complex of buildings, often compared to a citadel, constructed between 1905 and 1911 in Buenos Aires, Argentina to receive immigrants and stem the tide of communicable diseases following mass cholera outbreaks across the globe. The hotel, which saw more than a million immigrants pass through during its 42 years, now houses the National Museum of Immigration as well as the National University of Tres de Febrero's Contemporary Art Center.

== History ==
Following the 1873-1874 cholera outbreak, brought to the Americas by migrant ships, the Argentinian government sought ideas for how to stop foreign illnesses from entering the country. Guillermo Wilcken, head of Argentina's Central Immigration Commission, began planning a center where the country could enforce immigration regulations, thus protecting public health. He made an effort to avoid calling the new construction the Immigrant Asylum due to the word's connotations with beggars and poverty. Instead, he suggested the Immigration Hotel, the Department of Immigration, or the Immigration Center.

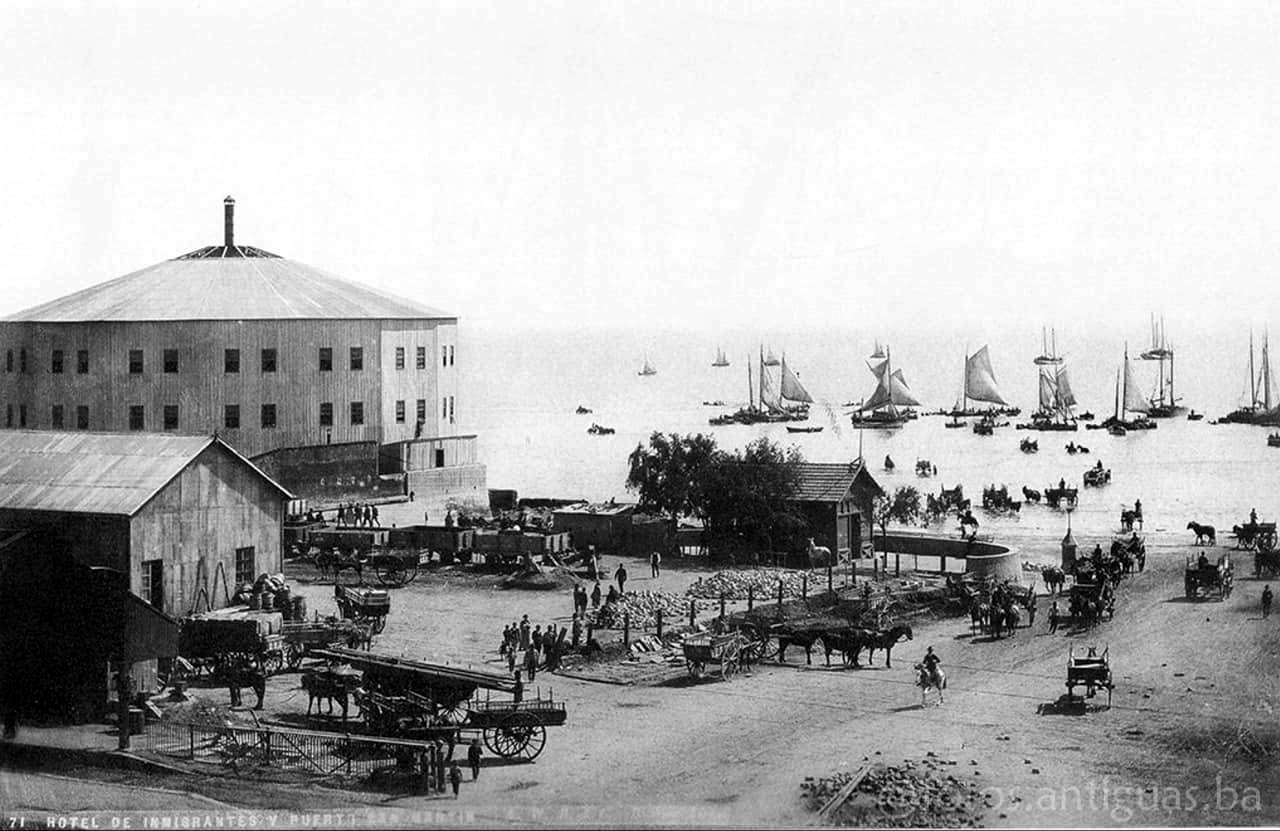
Ships arriving at the port near Rotonda de Retiro (left), 1880

This project was delayed for 20 years due to bureaucracy and another cholera outbreak. The government approved the plans and budget in 1883 and the construction in 1889 but the contractors, Udina & Mosca, were not offered a contract until 1905. In 1909, after more delays, they were replaced by Hungarian architect Juan Kronfuss and the German contracting company Wayss & Freytag. The complex was built at the Port of Buenos Aires, specifically Puerto Madero, for ease of use. The accommodations facilities were among the first buildings to be built using reinforced concrete in Buenos Aires. It was also near a railway station that went directly into the city, which made it a convenient location.

La Rotonda de Retiro, an older facility on the grounds of what is now the Retiro railway station, was used between 1877 and 1911 prior to the opening of the hotel. It could accommodate 800 people, about a quarter of the hotel's capacity. A complex with the same name still stands in nearby Bahía Blanca and also now functions as a museum.

Wilcken designed the building to impress European immigrants and to paint a picture of the "American Dream." It served the practical purpose of being easy to clean and disinfect, with its white tiled walls and large corridors, in part modeled after hospitals. Some critics argued it lacked "comforts or hygiene... that made... those who arrived lose all hope of prosperity," while others saw it as a way to welcome immigrants while allowing them to maintain their dignity.

The project was finished by 1911 and within a year was at its full capacity of 3,000.

=== Life at the Hotel ===
The hotel was "conceived as a citadel, compris[ing of] a series of buildings or pavilions arranged around a central plaza" and included, in order of construction, the disembarkation hall, the employment office, the administration block, the hospital, and the accommodation facilities. All services were offered free of charge to residents. The expectation was that residents would stay for a maximum of five days, with exception to those who were ill or could not find work. Some stayed for months.

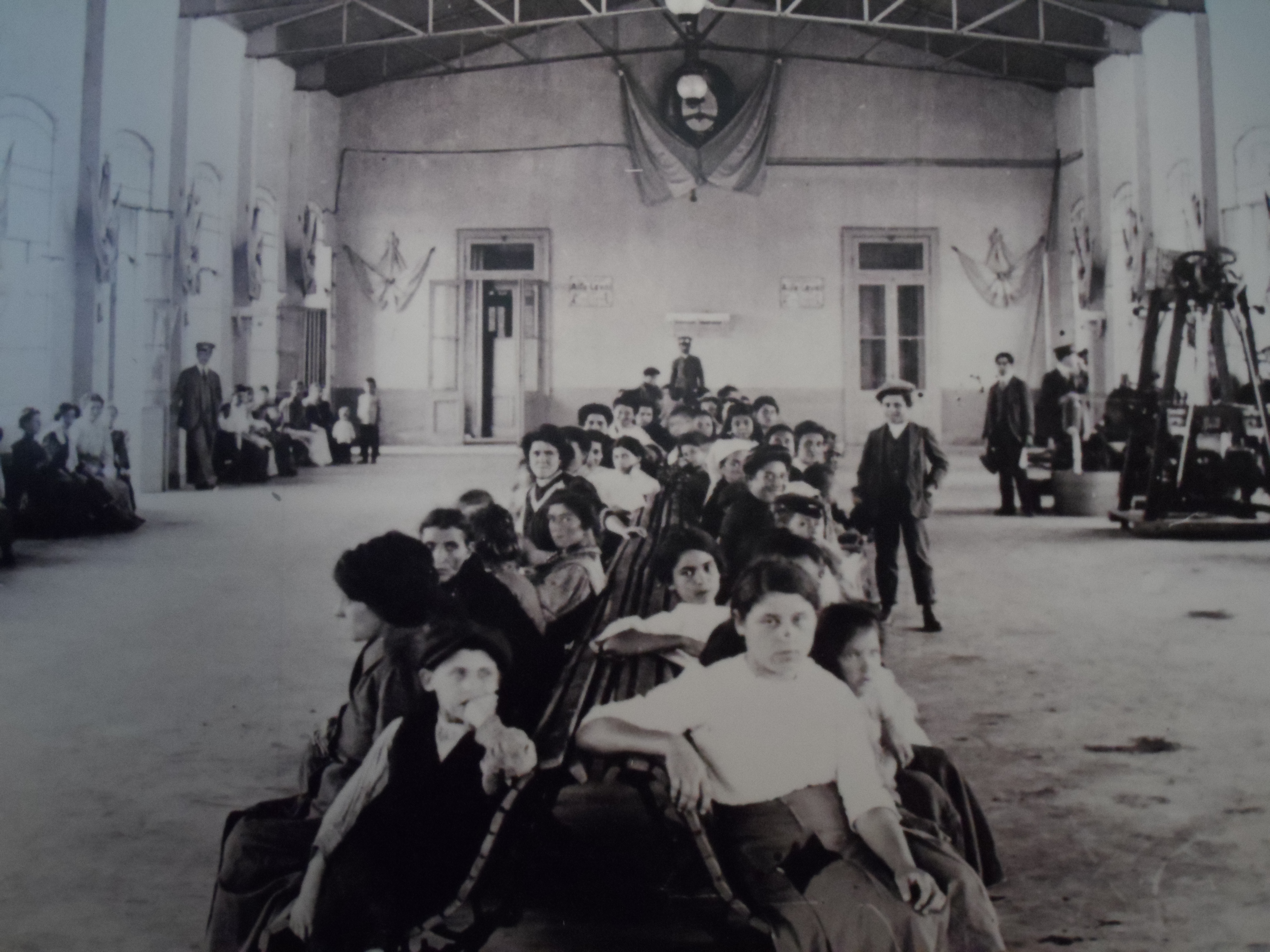
Residents waiting for their dining shift to begin.

Upon the arrival of a vessel, immigration officers boarded the ship to check documents before allowing anyone to disembark. Medical checks were carried out on board by a doctor, and immigrants over the age of 60 and/or with physical or mental health problems, particularly those with communicable diseases, were not permitted to enter Argentina. Luggage inspection took place in disembarkation sheds before being returned to their owners.

The employment office stood at the main entrance of the complex and primarily worked with immigrants to help them find employment. By 1913, the office added apprenticeships in agricultural machinery for both men and women; courses about Argentine society, customs, and language; and interpretation services. Propaganda was present in these courses. They also provided residents with identification cards and other necessary documents. A branch of Banco de la Nación Argentina was also on-site for currency exchange. The hospital reportedly had the most advanced medical equipment of the time. Doctors cared for patients who had become ill due to ship conditions and poverty.

The accommodation facilities were what initially became known as the Hotel de Inmigrantes. The building is four stories tall; the dining room, which had large windows overlooking the gardens, and kitchens on the ground level. The top three floors had four dormitories per floor, each bedroom with a capacity of 250 people. Women and children slept on the top floor to make it more difficult for men to sneak in. In lieu of a mattress, each bunk bed had "leather pieces" which were easier to clean and disinfect in the event of an outbreak.

Though residents could come and go as they wanted, the Hotel maintained a strict schedule:

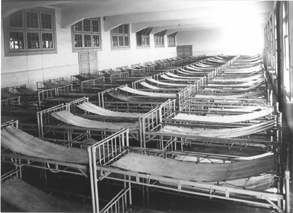
Bunk beds in the women's and children's dormitories

- 6:00am – Breakfast of coffee with milk, mate cocido, and fresh bread. Residents ate in shifts of up to 1,000.
- End of breakfast to 11am – Women would do domestic chores, including laundry and caring for the children, while men went to the city proper in search of work.
- 11:00am – Lunch: stew. Residents ate in shifts of 1,000.
- 3:00pm – Snack for children.
- 6:00pm – Dinner.
- 7:00pm – Bedrooms open to residents.

Though Hotel de Inmigrantes was not the only complex of its type, it was considered to be more "luxurious" than others, with the press referring to it as a "palace for the poor."

=== Additional immigration laws ===
Argentina's open border policy tightened during World War I, the most stringent prohibiting entry from the "insane, convicts and beggars." This 1916 law was difficult to police and the country required that immigrants provide a "certificate from the judicial authorities of their country of origin, stating that they have not been under the action of justice for crimes against social order during the ten years prior to their arrival, or for crimes that would have given rise to infamous penalties."

=== Post-Revolution ===
The hotel was no longer used after the Revolución Libertadora except intermittently by the military and for visa application processes. In the 1950s, the kitchens and dining room were used to feed the homeless population. In 1990, it was named a National Historic Monument under President Carlos Menem.

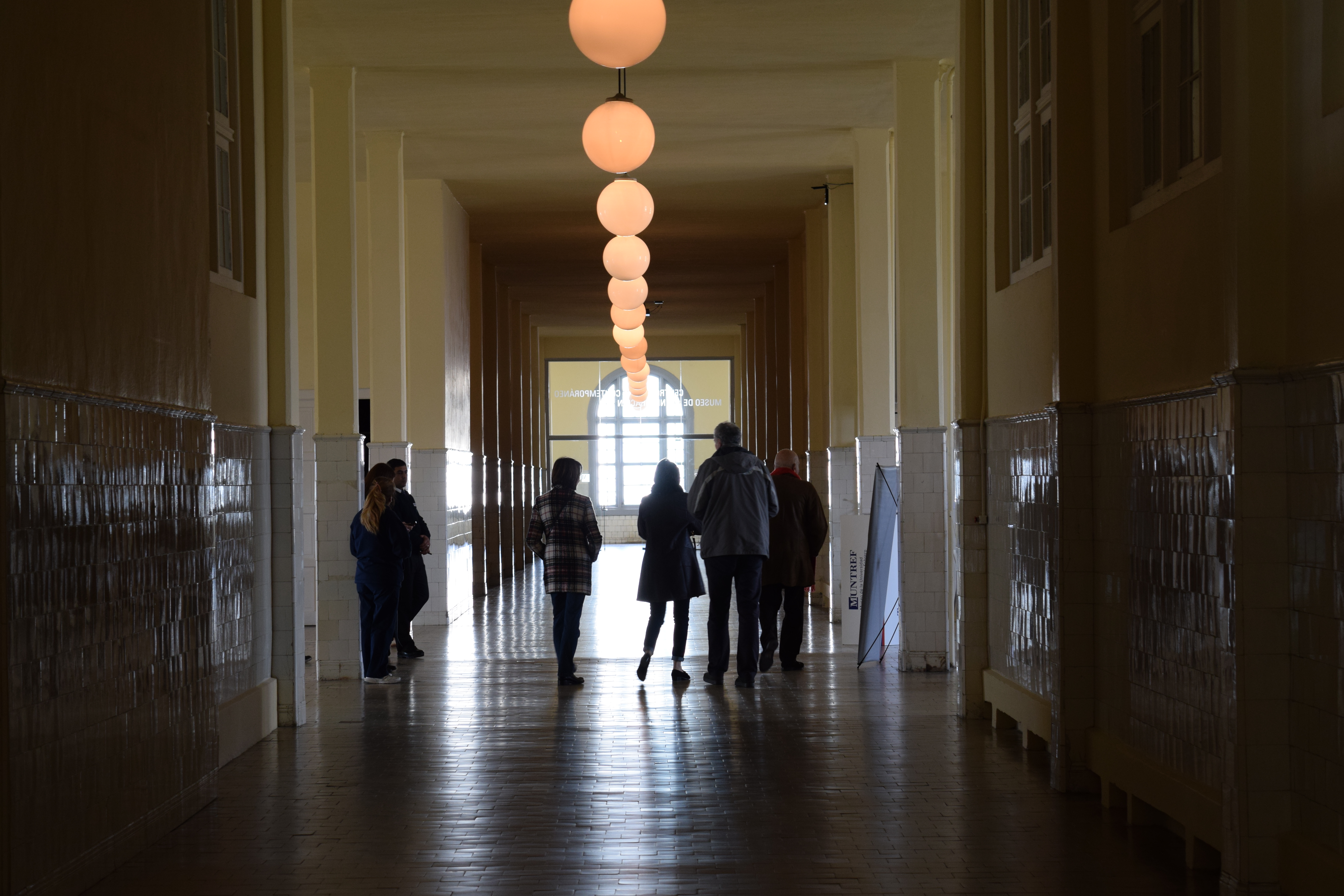
Visitors wandering the wide hallways of the Immigration Museum.

== Current tenants ==
The National Museum of Immigration moved into the space in 1974 and was joined by the National University of Tres de Febrero's Contemporary Art Center in 2012. The Immigration Museum is free to enter and its permanent exhibits include "Italians and Spaniards in Argentina" and "For All the Men of the World." Displays relating to the life of immigrants at the hotel are also present. The Museum is in the process of digitizing 5 million immigration records from 1882 to 1960 for genealogical and historical purposes. Between 1881 and 1914 alone, more than 4 million immigrants, including 2 million Italians and 1.4 million Spaniards, came to Argentina. The Contemporary Art Center has rotating exhibitions.

== See also ==
- Great European immigration wave to Argentina
- Immigration to Argentina
