= Encuentro y Fiesta Nacional de Colectividades =

Cultural event celebrated annually in Rosario, province of Santa Fe, Argentina

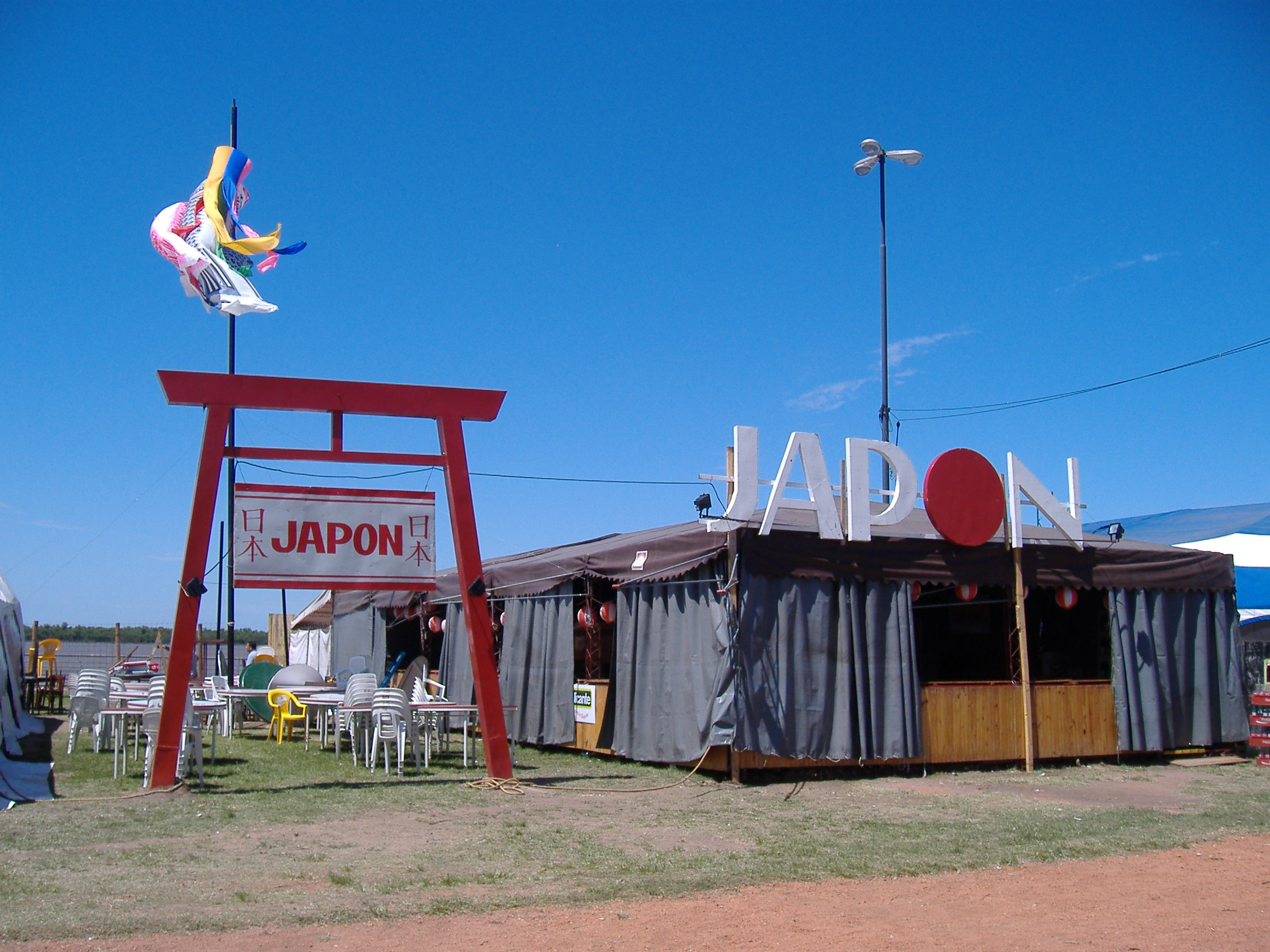
Japan at the 2006 Colectividades

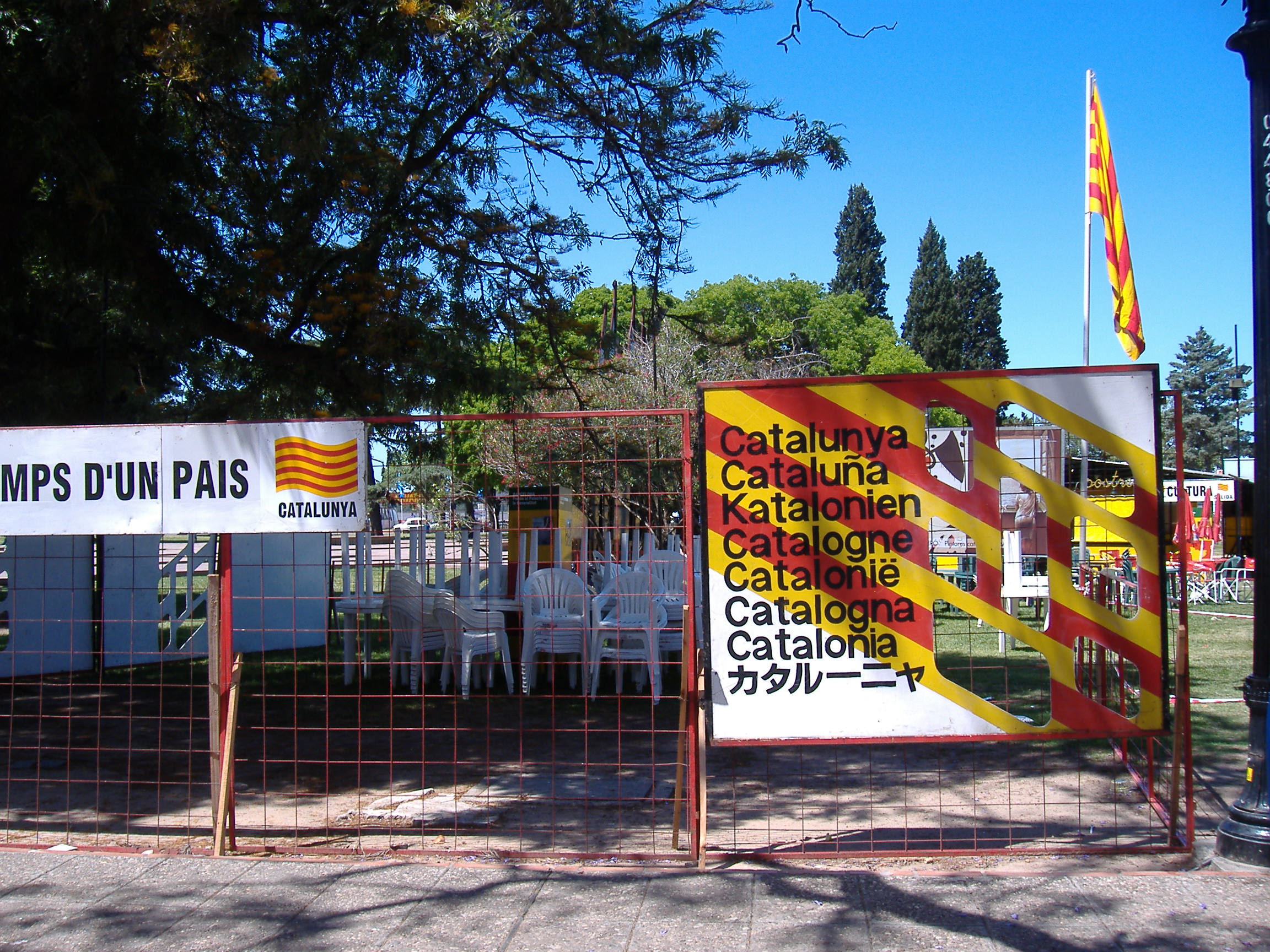
Catalonia at the 2006 Colectividades

The Communities Meeting and National Celebration (in Spanish, Encuentro y Fiesta Nacional de Colectividades) is a cultural event celebrated annually in Rosario, province of Santa Fe, Argentina, since 1985.

This event showcases the diversity of customs of the many established communities of immigrants that live in the city and around. It is locally known simply as las Colectividades, and usually held in the middle of spring (the first days of November), though in 2004 it was celebrated in December instead, to avoid overlapping with the Third International Congress of the Spanish Language (held in Rosario in mid-November). Tents, kiosks and several performing stages are set up in the National Flag Park (Parque Nacional a la Bandera), a large expanse on the shore of the Paraná River, right opposite the National Flag Memorial. Immigrant communities devote their space to selling typical foods and drinks, as well as other items, or for exhibits. The stages are devoted to the performance of dances and music. The festival is attended every year by tens of thousands of local residents and tourists.

In recent years, the Colectividades were marred by poor organization and abuse on the part of some communities, which in effect turned their spaces into common open-air bars and barbecues. Alcohol abuse by some attenders, robberies, problems with public transportation and traffic congestion in the area of the festival caused many people to complain or to miss the celebration altogether. In light of this and the recently increased touristic flow into the city, for 2005 the municipal government added special requirements for the communities' exhibits, such as a percentage of space to be devoted to cultural activities and the sale of typical foods only, and a change of the layout. The 2005 celebration was, accordingly, deemed better organized and safer than the previous ones, and attendance during its ten days reached about 1 million.
