= Great European immigration wave to Argentina =

Major immigration event took place in the late 19th and early 20th century

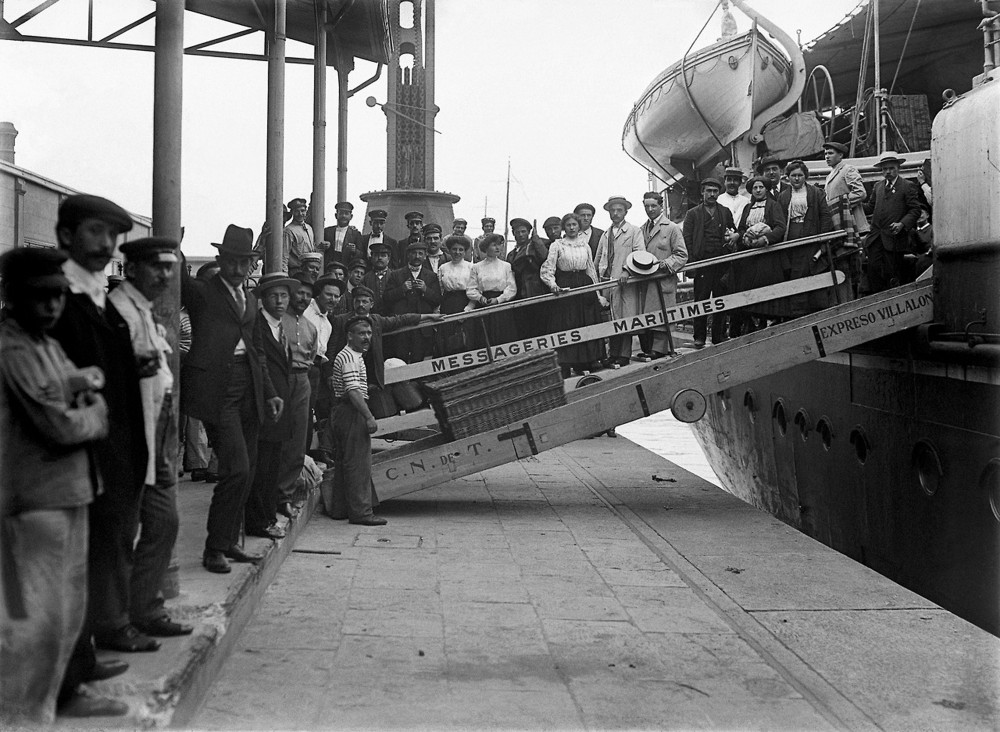
Immigrants arriving to Argentina.

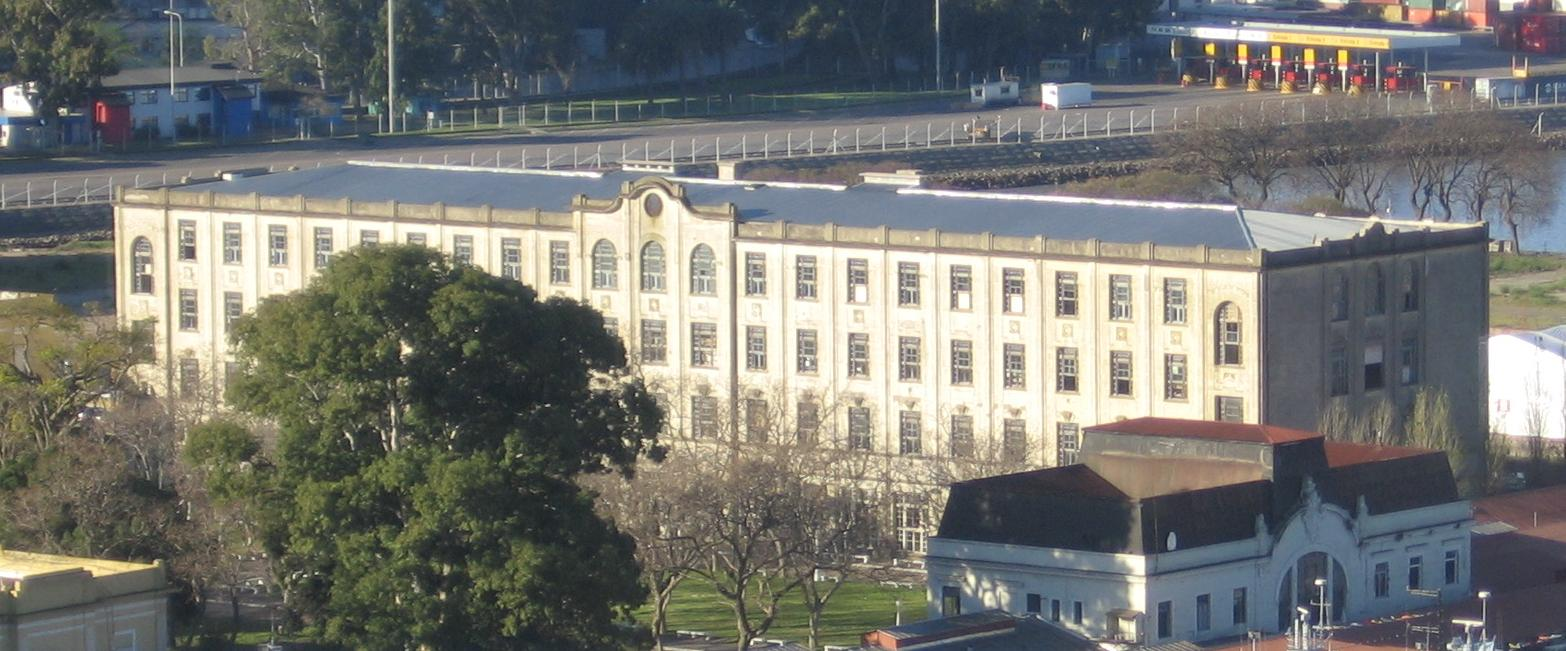
Immigrants' Hotel, Buenos Aires. Built in 1906, it could accommodate up to 4,000.

Map from 1914 of the percentage of the population by province born in Europe (excluding descendants and those from the Ottoman Empire).

The Great European Immigration Wave to Argentina was the period of greatest immigration in Argentine history, which occurred approximately from the 1860s to the 1960s, when more than six million Europeans arrived in Argentina. The massive wave (second only to the US in number) consisted largely of Italian and Spanish immigrants, with other major groups being French, ethnic Germans, Arabs, Basques, Poles, Ukrainians, Irish and Jews. To a lesser extent, other communities included Russians, Yugoslavians, Armenians, Welsh, Turks, Hungarians, English, Czechoslovaks, Swiss, Portuguese and various others.

The impact of the immigratory wave on the country's future demographic and cultural composition (specially in its capital city, the point of reception) can be judged by the fact that in the early 1800s the population of Buenos Aires did not exceed 40,000, the rest of the national territory (specially the surrounding region of the Pampas and Patagonia) virtually unpeopled. By 1895, foreigners had outnumbered natives in the city of Buenos Aires, and in Santa Fe province, almost 42% of its population was foreign. This rapid influx of European migrants led to immense population growth in Argentina. This was reflected in the national censuses: in 1869 the population amounted to around one million seven hundred and forty thousand inhabitants; in 1895 it had more than doubled, with nearly four million, and in 1914 it doubled again, with almost eight million.

The migrants have been incredibly influential in the demographic makeup of Argentina. The ethnic structure of Argentina drastically changed, with genetic studies currently ranging the European contribution between 60% and 80%. The percentage of urban population almost doubled from 28% in 1869 to 57% in 1930. Also, Europeans introduced many concepts such as labor unions, socialism, radicalism and anarchism into the country's political zeitgeist.

== Causes ==
=== Context in Europe ===
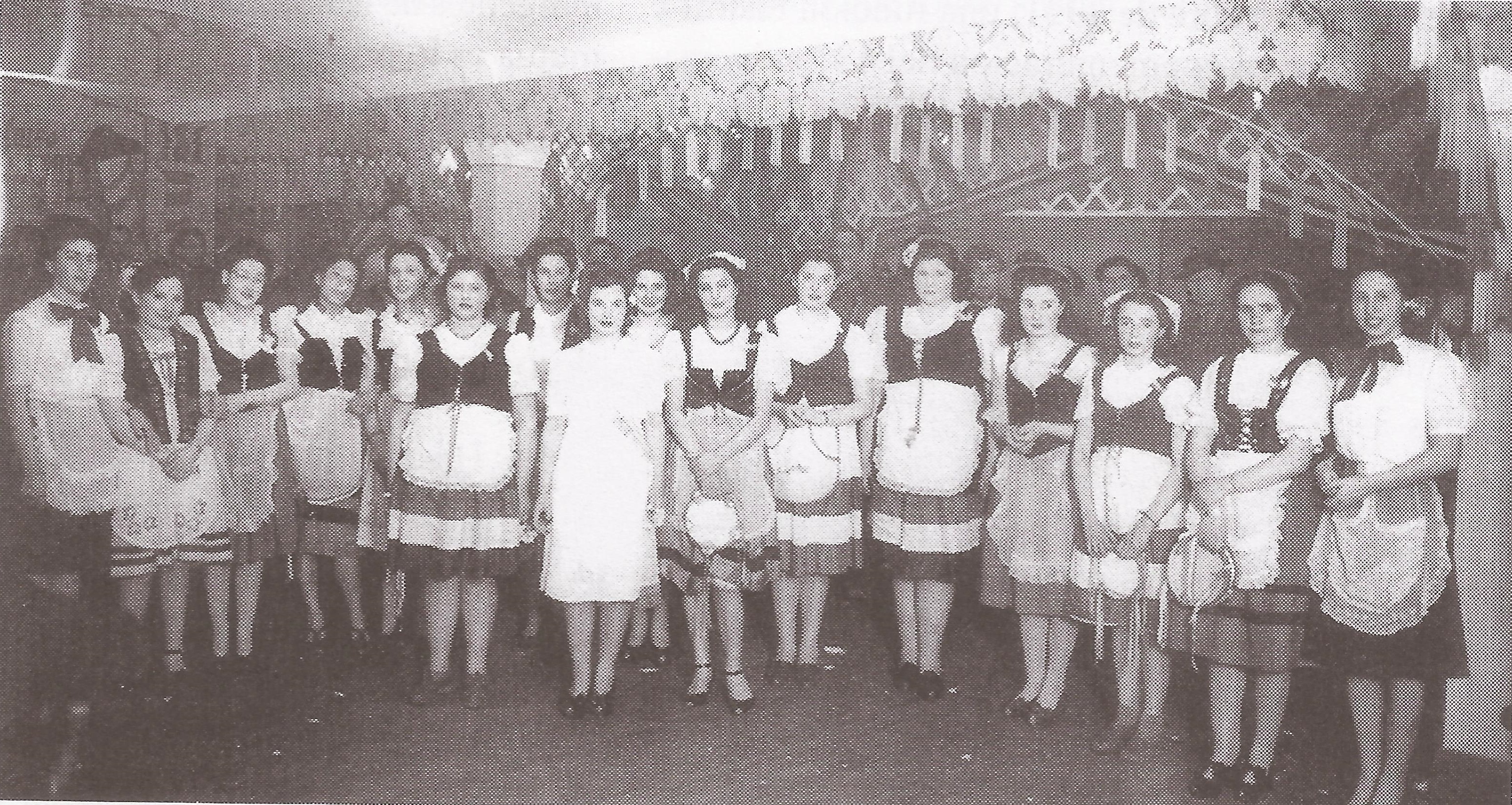
Kermes of the Italian Association of Comodoro Rivadavia, Chubut, to benefit Italian refugees during the Second World War.

The main factor behind the great wave of immigration to Argentina was the rise of steamship technologies. It greatly facilitated inter-oceanic migration, and made Europe much more vulnerable to mass emigration from any event affecting society. By the end of the 19th century, ocean travel became quite affordable, and the travel time between European ports and Buenos Aires had significantly shortened. In the 1830s, crossing the Atlantic from Italian ports like Genoa or Livorno in sailboats took more than fifty days. But with steamships, the journey was cut to between 18 and 24 days.

Also, Europe was undergoing a period of turmoil which caused mass emigration. Key events included the outbreak of World War I and World War II along with their consequences, the Spanish Civil War, the Armenian Genocide, the pogroms in the Russian Empire and other acts of antisemitism.

Economically, the instability caused by the Long Depression (1873-1899) was one of the main reasons for so many to migrate. The crises had a huge impact in the agricultural sector, as the price of grain in 1894 was only a third what it had been in 1867. In Spain, the commercial break with France at the beginning of the 1890s was fundamental as well, since it closed the market to which most of its agricultural production was directed. This caused the ruin of a large part of the Spanish peasantry, with many being forced to emigrate.

Italy is a notable example of the economic difficulties faced during that time, with many Italian agricultural laborers living close to starvation. Since the cost of transoceanic transport had significantly decreased, wheat from the United States reached the Italian market at prices much more competitive than domestic production. The effect of this wave of early globalization in Italy, as in other countries, was economic stagnation and increasing social conflicts. About a quarter of the population relied on charity in one form or another. Also, the unification of Italy in 1861–70 broke down the feudal land system that had survived in the south since the Middle Ages (especially where land had been the inalienable property of aristocrats, religious bodies or the king). However the breakdown of feudalism and redistribution of land resulted in many remaining landless and plots being too small, and in turn more unproductive when land was subdivided among heirs. Moreover, Francesco Crispi launched a trade war against France from 1888 to 1898, and it resulted in an economic disaster for Italy.

The Second Industrial Revolution also had a negative impact on some parts of the European population. Technological innovation ruined the traditional activities of many rural laborers and artisans, who chose emigration as an alternative to proletarianization and sought to practice their activities in their destination countries. In Northern Italy the spread of the mechanical loom harmed peasants who carried out work at home with hand looms.

=== Context in Argentina ===
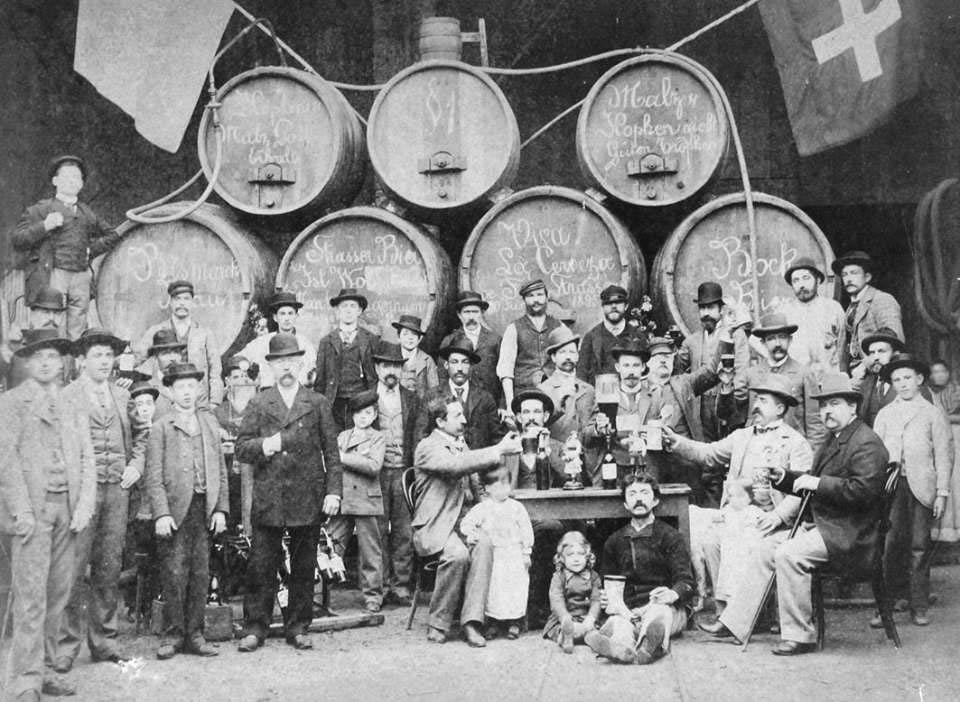
Friedrich Strasser and his Swiss employees at the Strasser Brewery in Rosario, Santa Fe in 1885.

While Europe was going through this instability, Argentina was going through a process of political pacification and consolidation of its institutions, giving an end to an era marked by several civil wars. Argentina experienced its period of greatest economic growth up to that time, due to the huge influx of money caused by the rise of the agroexport model. Argentina possessed an untapped wealth of natural resources that created high demand for both skilled and unskilled labor.

In comparison to many other Latin American countries at that time, Argentina offered significantly higher wage opportunities for immigrants, which were also higher than those in some of the main source countries like Italy, Spain, and Portugal. Therefore, many Europeans went to Argentina in search of better living conditions.

=== Policies promoting immigration ===
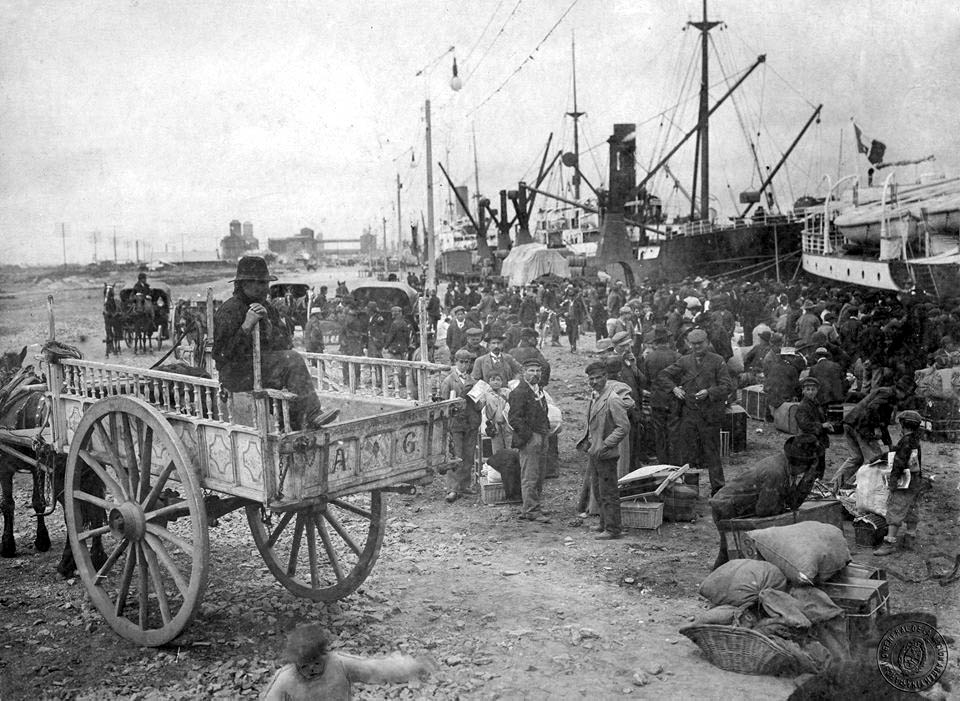
Italian immigrants arriving in Buenos Aires, Argentina.

From the 1850s into the early 1900s, Argentina's national policy was one of maximizing immigration:

The idea of attracting European immigration to Argentina was one of the central themes in Juan Bautista Alberdi's book "Bases and points of departure for the Political Organization of the Argentine Republic", from which the Argentine Constitution of 1853 would adopt several ideas. Alberdi wrote in his work the famous phrase "To govern is to populate" since he saw immigration as "a means of progress and culture for South America".

According to Alberdi, immigration was one of the keys to Argentina's potential development. Because when immigrants of industrialized countries would settle in Argentina, they could help making possible the transformation of Argentina it into an advanced nation. Alberdi believed in what he called "the education of things," which consisted of educating by example and by teaching concrete skills, rather than by formal teaching.

Thus, inspired by Alberdi's work, the 1853 Constitution in its article 20 and 25 said the following:

Article 20.- Foreigners enjoy all the civil rights of citizens in the territory of the Confederation: they may exercise their industry, commerce and profession; own real estate, purchase and transfer it; navigate the rivers and coasts; freely practice their religion; make wills and marry according to the law. They are not obliged to accept citizenship, nor to pay extraordinary compulsory contributions. They obtain naturalization by residing two continuous years in the Confederation; but the authority may shorten this period in favor of the person who requests it, alleging and proving service to the Republic.

Article 25.- The Federal Government shall encourage European immigration; and may not restrict, limit or impose any tax on the entry into Argentine territory of foreigners who bring the purpose of working the land, improving industries and introducing and teaching science and the arts.

Former president and thinker Domingo Faustino Sarmiento also believed that European immigration would develop Argentina. He argued that Argentina's great dilemma was between civilization and barbarism. As many thinkers of his time, he identified civilization with Europe, which he saw as the source of progress for Argentina in his famous essay "Facundo". While according to him, barbarism was related to the rural, the indigenous and the gaucho, whose culture was backward. This dilemma, according to him, could only be resolved with the triumph of "civilization" over barbarism.

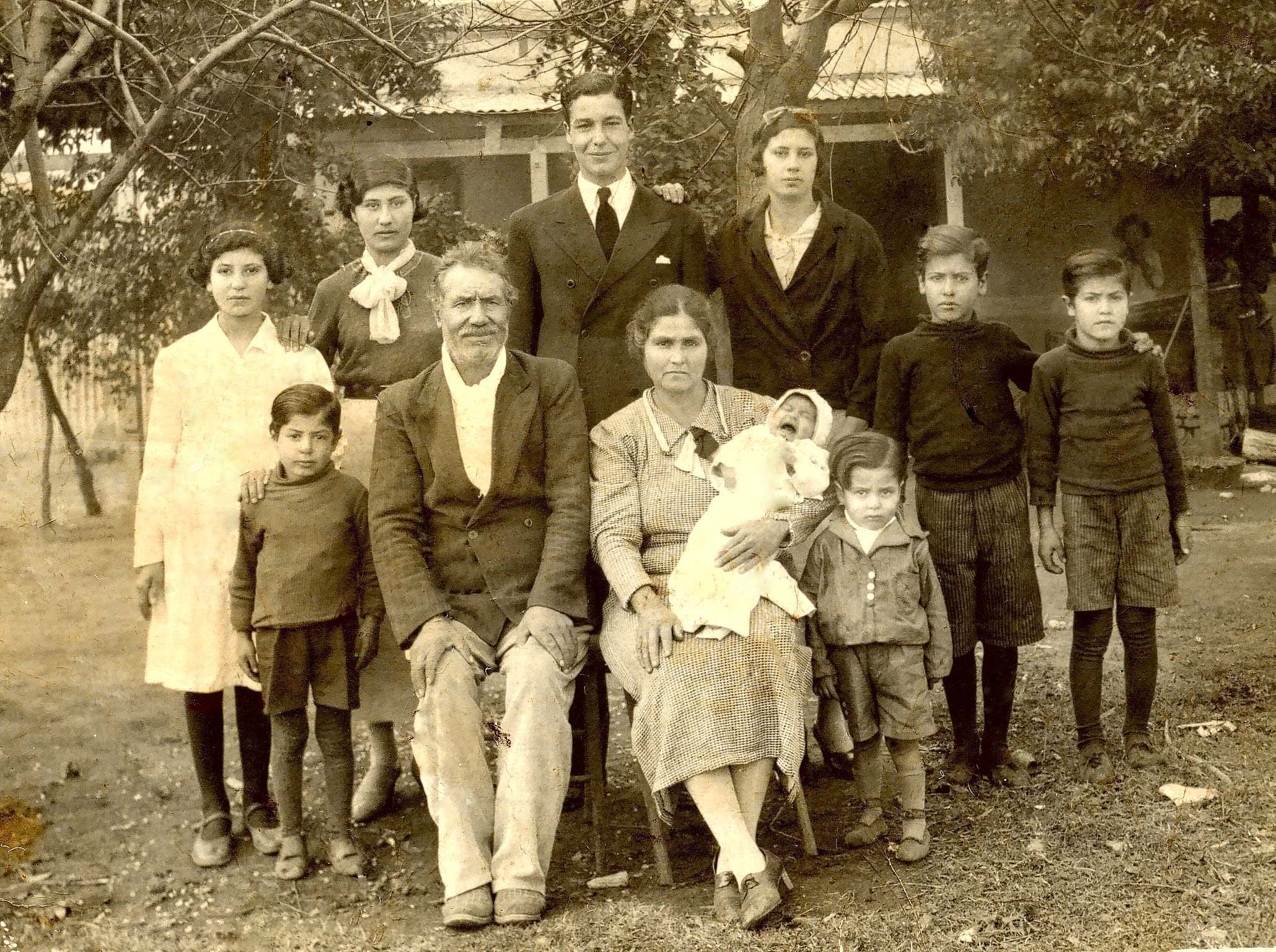
A Spanish immigrant family in the town of Arias, Córdoba.

On October 1, 1869, during the presidency of Sarmiento, Law No. 346 on "Citizenship and Naturalization" was passed. The spirit of this law was to significantly ease the naturalization of foreigners into Argentina. The novelty was that it did not establish a distinction between Argentines and citizens for the exercise of political rights, defining Argentines as "all individuals born or to be born in the territory of the Republic, no matter the nationality of their parents" and also as "children of native Argentines who, having been born in a foreign country, opt for Argentine citizenship". Therefore, a strong Jus Soli and a Jus sanguinis were both established.

During the presidency of Nicolás Avellaneda, in 1876, the Immigration and Colonization Act of 1876 was passed and promulgated. The law consists of 121 chapters, half of them dedicated to immigration, and the other half to colonization. Article 45 stated that every immigrant, provided that they "sufficiently demonstrated his good conduct and his aptitude for any industry, art or useful trade", had the right to be housed and maintained at the expense of the State for five days following his disembarkation. In addition, the Public Authority was also responsible for his transfer to the place in the country he chose as residence. On the other hand, when the immigrant so desired, he could obtain employment through the Labor Office. Also, if the immigrant was going to the interior of the country and there was an Immigration Commission at the destination, it had to provide the immigrant with accommodation and food for a period of up to ten days.

=== Favorable geography and culture ===
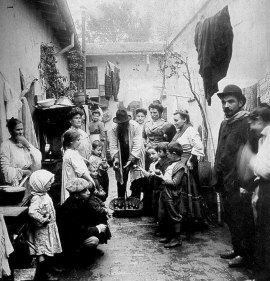
Italian immigrants in a conventillo in Buenos Aires. Italian is the largest single ethnic origin of European immigrants in the country, and became a major part of modern Argentine society.

Geographically, Argentina has easy access to the Atlantic Ocean, its Pampa region is one of the most fertile and extensive areas for cultivation on the planet and its temperature is temperate such as that in most of Europe. Culturally, Argentina, having been part of the Spanish Empire, maintained a culture somewhat similar to that of Europeans. These favorable conditions would encourage foreigners to emigrate to Argentina.

== Effect of European immigration ==
=== Demographic ===
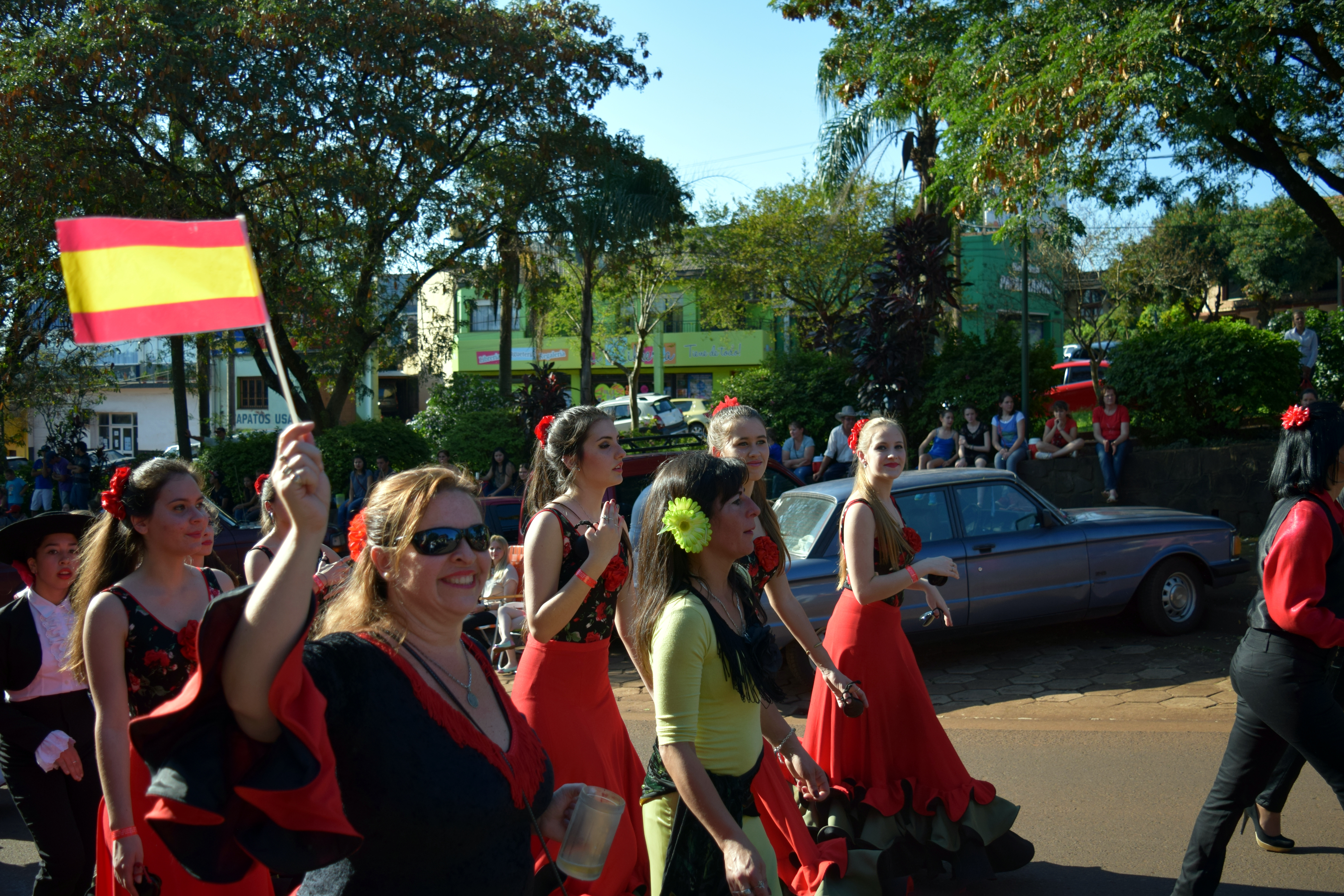
Argentines of Spanish descent during the parade of the XXXIV Immigrant's Festival in Oberá, Misiones.

Between 1870 and 1914, 5.9 million Europeans migrated to Argentina, with 3.2 million of them staying. As a result of the immigration wave, Argentina's population was roughly four times larger in 1914 than it was in 1870. While immigrants came from all over Europe, the three most represented countries of origin were Italy, Spain, and France. Collectively, immigrants from these three countries accounted for over 5 million immigrants. While the population increased, Argentine citizenship did not. Legal citizens made up 2.2% of the entire immigrant population by 1914. However, Argentina's Citizenship Law gave citizenship to all persons born in Argentina. The immigrants themselves did not become citizens, but their children did, which would create a new middle class.

=== Economic ===
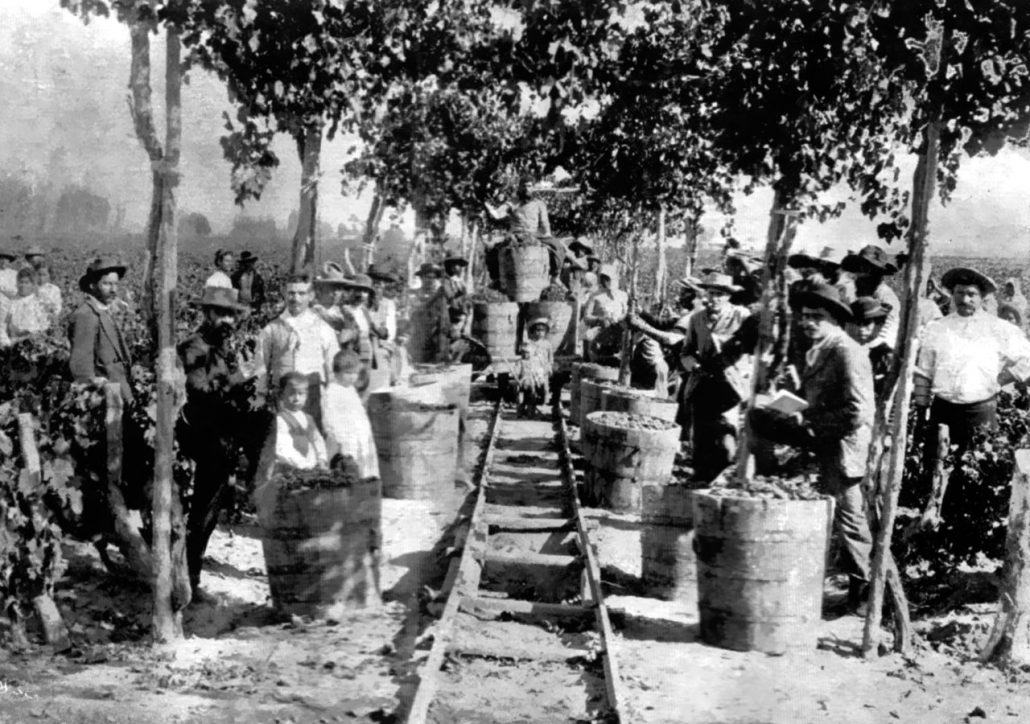
German immigrants harvesting in a vineyard in Mendoza.

Economically, Argentina benefited from European immigration. During the wave of European immigration, Argentina's percentage of world GDP grew from 0.99% to 2.42% as a result of immigrant labor. Immigration helped connect Argentina to the global economy, as a 10% increase in immigrants from a particular origin country was roughly equal to an 8% increase in exports to that country. With the influx of laborers, Argentina was able to expand its agricultural production and exportation. The agricultural sector was equipped to handle the increase in laborers, as many rural property owners had uncultivated farm land. By renting their land to immigrants, many rural towns were able to flourish with the cultivation of large land worked by European immigrant families.

Beyond production, immigrants also aided Argentina's industrialization efforts. 70% of immigrants lived in urban areas in 1914, which was a ten percent increase over a twenty year period. The increase in production additionally created a need for increased transportation networks. To build these networks, Argentina again sought and supported immigrant labor. In 1905, Argentine railroad companies sponsored the immigration of more than 20,000 Italians.

=== Social ===
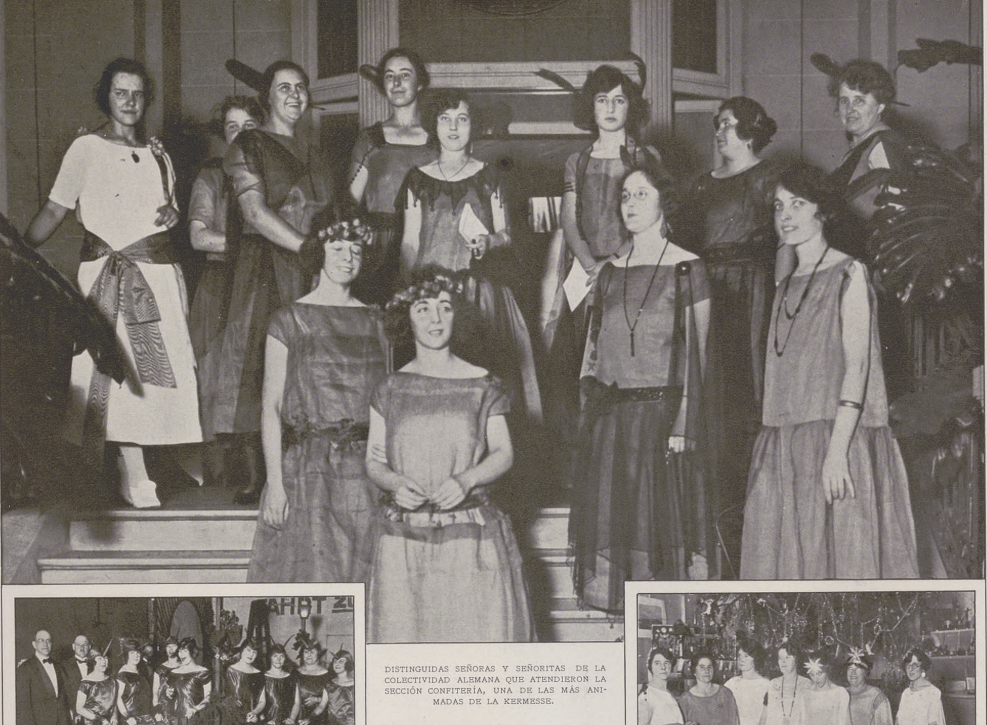
German Catholic community in Buenos Aires in 1923.

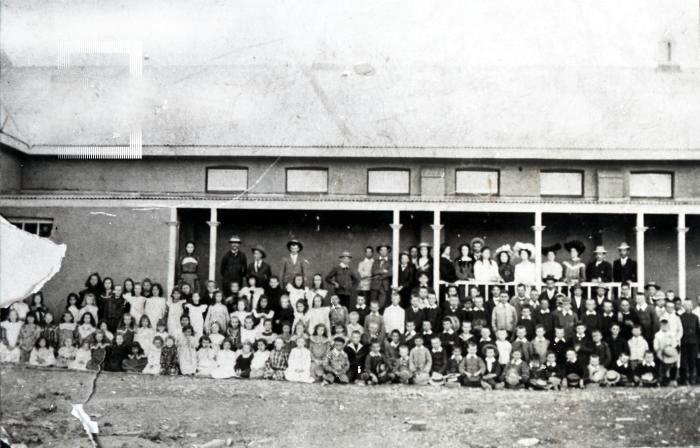
Afrikaner immigrants in Colonia Sarmiento, Chubut in 1920.

The population of Argentina grew four-fold over the Great European Immigration Wave causing a change to the social structure of Argentina. The Constitution of 1853 explicitly encouraged European immigrants as a tool to civilize and whiten the Argentine population. The elites (the descendants of the Spanish colonial ruling class, along with a small group of wealthy European immigrants) believed that American Indians should be part of the Argentine society culturally and identically and that European immigrants could industrialise the primitive country of Argentina in order to provide socioeconomic opportunities and foment the Argentine national identity. " This belief created a national identity where Europeans, along with the Indians and Blacks, could adapt the cultural traditions and values of the Argentine Nation The early waves of immigration did not experience such greater numbers. This was caused by the ongoing Argentine civil wars(after the unification of the Argentine state by Buenos Aires in 1861) and, the most notable one, The War of the Triple Alliance (where Paraguay fought and lost an aggressive war against Argentina, Brazil, and Uruguay from 1864 to 1870), the population of Argentina (Criollo, Mestizos, Indians and Black people) declined because of higher mortality rates, warfare(war of independence and Argentine civil wars) and diseases.

The new middle class emerged from this influx of European immigrants. The European immigrants provided labor to the untapped Argentine land. In addition to developing agricultural production these immigrants caused an increase in middle-class development. Prior to the 1870s, Argentina exhibited a three-tiered class structure consisting of an elite, a ruling class, and a peasant class. Between 1870 and 1914, the once small middle class grew by 30%. 46% of this emerging socio-economic group were European-born immigrants, according to a 1914 census.

The higher pay in Argentina compared to Europe for manual labor attracted many immigrants causing crowded cities and higher crime. Between 1887 and 1912 Buenos Aires's population tripled while the number of crimes reported increased seven times. In Buenos Aires, it was estimated that an average immigrant family contained five people in a one-room house that was twelve by twelve feet. The crowded cities were also a central point in crime. There was a rapid increase in thieves, pickpockets, racketeers, and prostitution making large cities like Buenos Aires infamous by 1914. Argentina's unemployment also rose, further increasing poverty rates. It is estimated that 73% of the inmates in the Buenos Aires beggars' asylum were foreigners.

=== Cultural ===
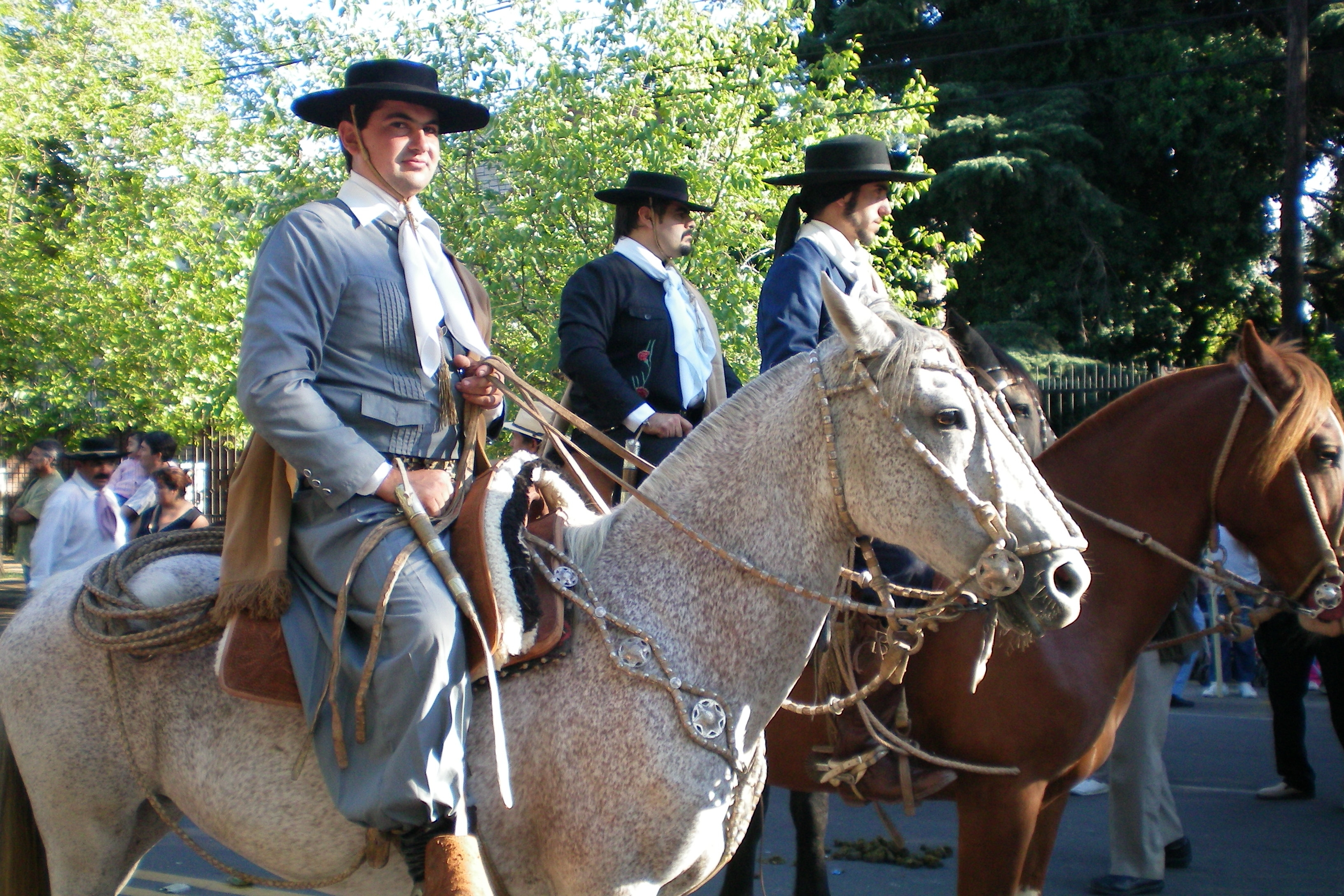
Gauchos at the National Harvest Festival in Mendoza.

The mass amount of immigration in Argentina created a melting pot for many different cultures. The mix of European and Indian cultures led to a new mestizo culture and a "formation of an identity that was not European nor indigenous." The Italian immigrants brought new cultural touchstones such as the Italian language, hand gestures, and different foods to Argentina. In addition, many communities like the Jewish, German, and Welsh communities also kept some traditional cultural elements while mixing in with the Indian population along with the Spanish and Italian cultures.

=== Political ===
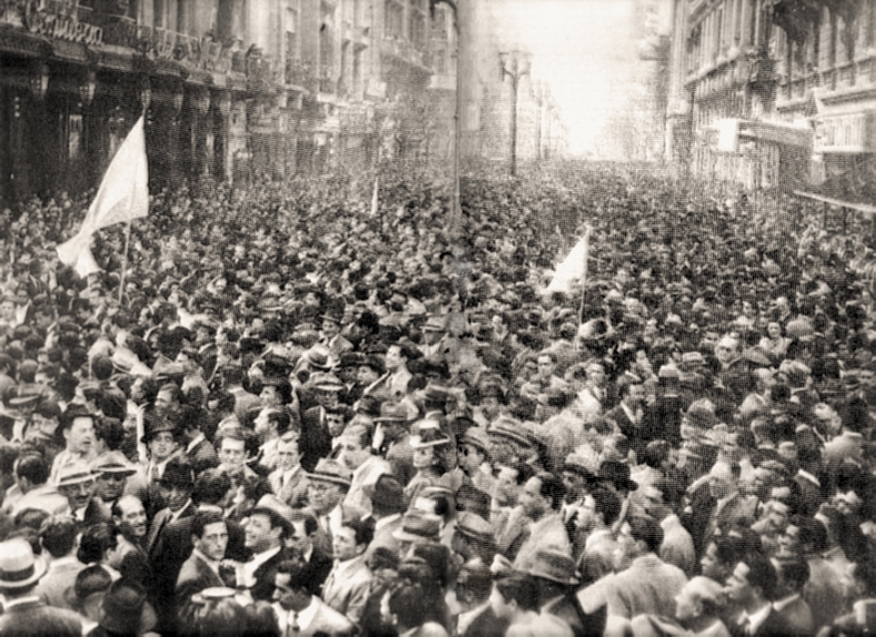
Members of the UCR during the anti-Peronist March for the Constitution and Liberty in Buenos Aires in 1945.

While political elites had favored and fostered European immigration, these immigrants created new political demands among the polity that were not so aligned with the ideas of those in power. A diversity of cultural ideals, a growing middle class, and activism of immigrants who had fled their home country because of their political beliefs created a rich union, socialist, and anarchist presence in Argentina, particularly in Buenos Aires. By 1901, movements fueled by Spanish, Italian, and French immigrants had organized and were enacting labor strikes and protests against the government. In response, the government began deporting immigrants that they felt threatened their institutions, whether they were criminals or political agitators, via a new Residency Law. Italians, Spaniards, and Jewish Argentines in particular were targets of prejudice and back lash, being targeted by policing in urban areas due to assumed criminality. The turn of the century saw increased regulation of immigration, a political response to racial and social questions posed by an influx of Europeans.

== End of the European Immigration Wave ==
One reason European immigration slowed during the early 20th century was because Argentine elites began to criticize the nation's unrestricted European migration. Elitist-owned newspapers created anti-immigration propaganda to discourage migration with the hopes of also decreasing crime and unemployment. Newspapers often contained descriptions that "stereotyped the typical anarchist as a fat, swarthy, and ugly Italian or Spaniard bristling with knives, bombs, and other lethal weapons." Increased deportations began in conjunction to shifting attitudes. These measures, coupled with the onset of World War I, made it more difficult for European immigrants to find a home in Argentina.

== See also ==
- Culture of Argentina
- Argentines of European descent
- History of the Jews in Argentina
