= Japanese Uruguayans =

Uruguayo japonés 日系ウルグアイ人
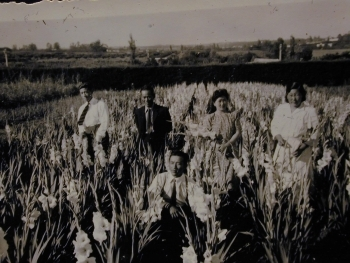
- Japanese flower growers in Uruguay, early 20th century

Regions with significant populations
- Montevideo

Languages
- Spanish, Japanese

Religion
- Roman Catholicism and Buddhism

Related ethnic groups
- Japanese diaspora, Japanese Americans, Japanese Canadians, Japanese Argentines, Japanese Mexicans, Japanese Paraguayans, Japanese Brazilians
- Note: The population of naturalized Japanese people and their descendants is unknown. Only the number of the permanent residents with Japanese nationality is shown.

Japanese Uruguayans (Spanish: nipón-uruguayos; Japanese: 日系ウルグアイ人, Nikkei Uruguaijin) are Uruguayan citizens of Japanese descent.

Japanese immigration to Uruguay began in the early 20th century. It was characterized to be small in number and mainly indirect, that is, Japanese immigrant previously had been established in another South American country but later moving to Uruguay, although some came directly from Japan. The immigration wave happened in two periods, the first since the early 20th century until before World War II and the latter since the mid-1950s to 1960s.

== History ==
The first South American country that Japanese people settled was Brazil. But when Brazil decided to halt Japanese Brazil immigration in 1930s, Uruguay became one of the countries to welcome the Japanese settlers to populate the unpopulated areas. Most of them remained in the capital, Montevideo. When World War II began, there was anti-Japanese sentiment, especially from German Uruguayans and Italian Uruguayans. Japanese language teaching in schools and newspaper and book publishing in Japanese were prohibited. After the end of the war, hundreds of Japanese refugees were still permitted by Uruguayan government to settle.

In recent decades, many Japanese settlers arrived especially as businessmen to profit in the country. In 2001, Princess Sayako inaugurated the Japanese Garden of Montevideo. In 2008, a ceremony of the 100th anniversary of the Japanese emigration in Uruguay was held, with the presence of Princess Takamado.

The 2011 Uruguayan census revealed 186 people who declared Japan as their country of birth.

== Religion ==
The majority of Japanese Uruguayans are Roman Catholic Christians, while the rest are Buddhists.

== Institutions ==
As Genta Dorado said in his book, the Japanese cultural activities of most of Japanese community and its descendants (generally issei and nisei) takes place at Asociación Japonesa en el Uruguay (Japanese Association in Uruguay).

== Notable Japanese Uruguayans ==
- Bárbara Mori – Actress
- Kenya Mori – Actress
- Kintaró Mori – Singer

== See also ==
- Japan–Uruguay relations
