= Japanese Association of Rosario =

Community devoted to the promotion of Japanese culture in Rosario, Argentina

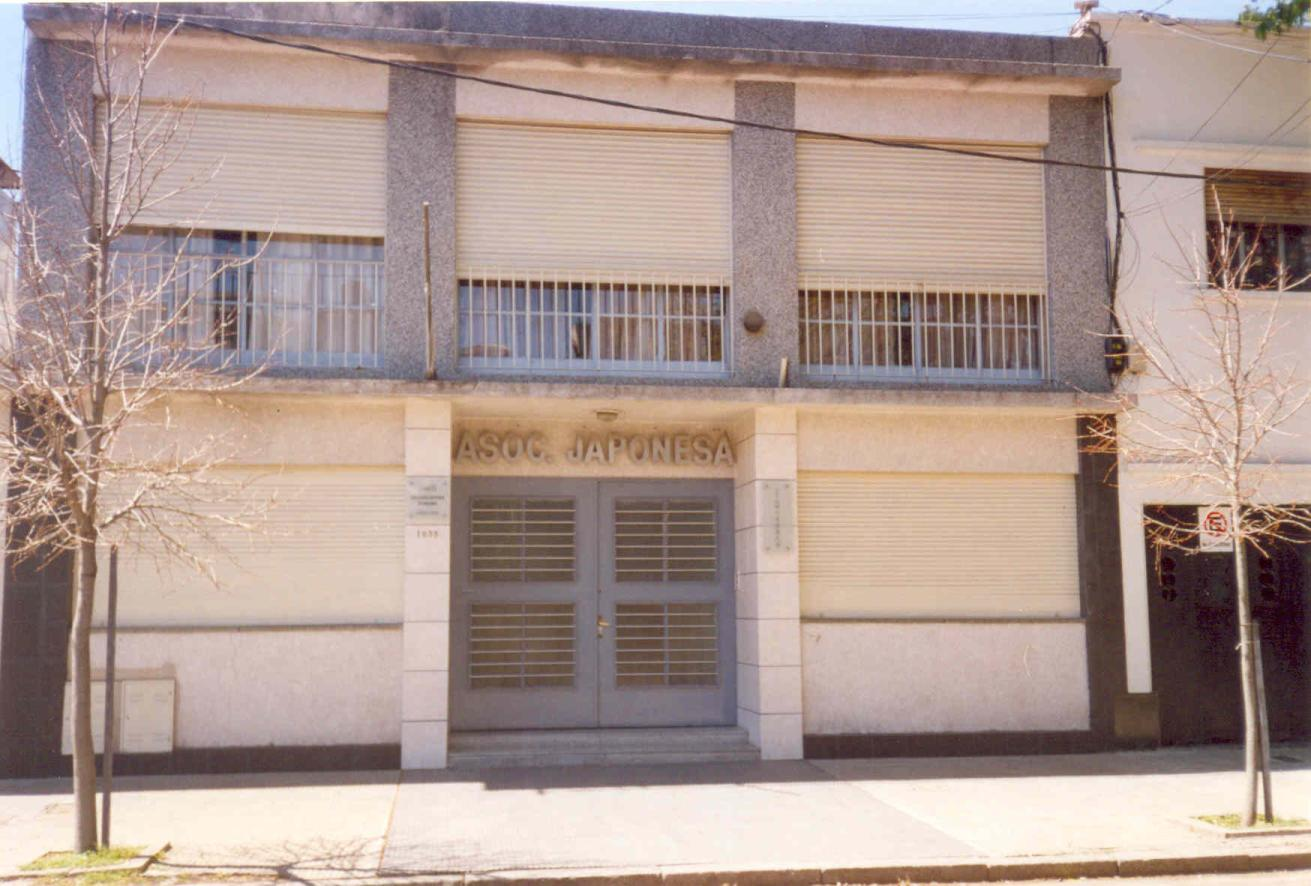
The front of the AJR's building, on Iriondo St., Rosario.

The Japanese Association of Rosario (in Spanish, Asociación Japonesa de Rosario, AJR; in Japanese, ロサリオ日本人会 Rosario Nihonjinkai) is a community devoted to the promotion of Japanese culture, located in Rosario, province of Santa Fe, Argentina. The Association was founded by immigrants from Japan and their descendants.

== History ==
In 1920 a period of considerable Japanese immigration into Argentina began, with its peak in 1936 before World War II. Even before this date, more-or-less regular gatherings of Japanese people were organized at private houses. By 1918 a room was hired to serve as the seat of the nascent Association, opposite today's Central Post Office. In 1922 the AJR affiliated with the Japanese Association of Argentina. The seat of the AJR was moved then in 1933, 1938 and 1940. In 1940 World War II forced the AJR to dissolve.

Yet some years later the Association re-assembled, this time with official status, acknowledged on 1 May 1949 by 50 members. Its authorities were: President Shiira Masateru, Vice-President Tomita Genkichi, and Secretary Teruya Toshio. The seat was located on 1240 Entre Ríos St., home of Mr. Natsumoto Hideki. It was removed a few times afterwards, in 1951 and 1952.

In 1953 the AJR proposed, agreed on, and funded the creation of a Pantheon for the deceased members, their families and the Japanese community in general.

In 1957 a property at 1035 Iriondo St. was acquired. The seat of the Association was moved there in 1963, where it remains at present (2006). In the period that goes from 1968 to 1976 many works were done there: the construction of the Japanese Language School, the room for the housemaster, complete service infrastructure, a judō dōjō, a gymnasium, a hall with a performing stage, etc.

== Activities ==
The Japanese Association of Rosario provides facilities for a number of socio-cultural activities, such as classes of shodō (brush calligraphy), origami, karate, and taiko drum playing, eisa dancing, and more prominently Japanese language classes.

A large part of the structure is devoted to the Japanese Language School (ロサリオ日本語学校 Rosario Nihongo Gakkō), which has a teaching schedule compatible with international requirements, preparing students who wish to do so for the Japanese Language Proficiency Test. The school celebrates a yearly karaoke contest and a reading contest (whose selected winners may attend a national Japanese reading contest in Buenos Aires).

The AJR has also hosted or sponsored picnics and sports contests, and participates representing Japan in the celebration devoted to the local immigrant communities (Encuentro y Fiesta Nacional de Colectividades), held in Rosario usually in November each year.

== See also ==
- Japanese Argentine
- Buenos Aires Japanese Gardens
- Instituto Privado Argentino-Japonés

== Sources ==
- Asociación Japonesa de Rosario (official website, in Spanish)
