= Tomás Rebord =

Argentine lawyer and radio host

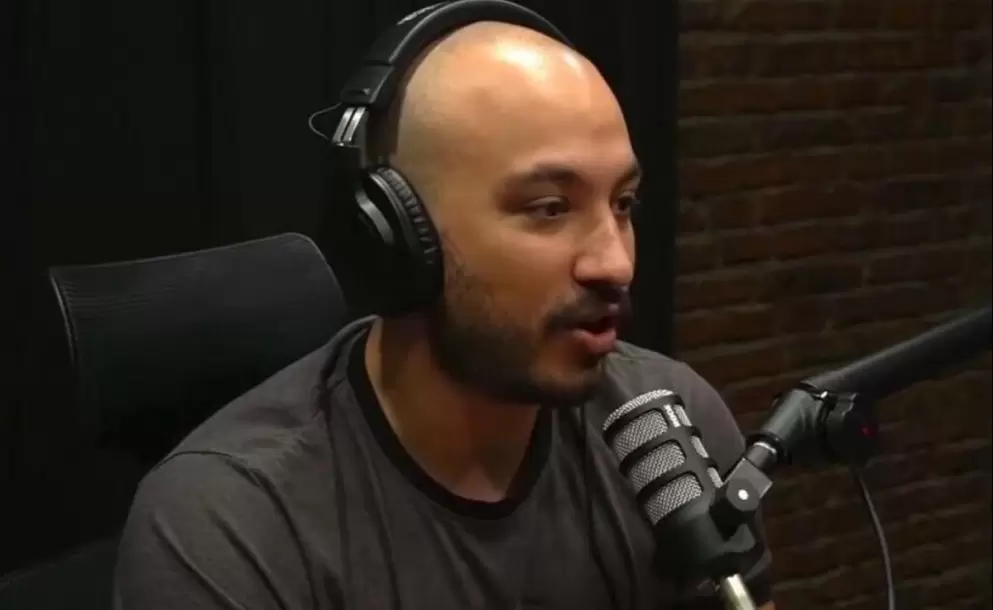
- Born: July 6, 1993 (age 33); Almagro, Buenos Aires, Argentina
- Education: University of Buenos Aires
- Occupation: Lawyer

Tomás Rebord (born 6 July 1993) is an Argentine lawyer, former political activist, radio host and writer.

He starred in the radio and streaming shows Caricias Significativas and MAGA, as well as the program Hay Algo Ahí, on the argentine streaming channel Blender.

In 2024, he published his first novel, Comentarios al Náucrato.

Rebord has gained recognition for his political commentary edibordials, which have become a highlight in his career as an entertainer. Regarding his political positions, Rebord has declared himself as a Peronist .

He studied law at the University of Buenos Aires, becoming the first in his family to attend university.
