= Matheu =

Matheu may refer to:

== People ==
- Domingo Matheu, Argentine politician
- Joan Clos i Matheu, mayor of Barcelona, Spain from 1997 to 2006
- Manuel de Falla, Spanish composer of classical music, full name "Manuel de Falla y Matheu"
- Matheu Hinzen, Dutch singer who represented the Netherlands in the Junior Eurovision Song Contest 2019
- Matheu Nelson (born 1999), American baseball player

== Other ==
- Matheu, Buenos Aires, a settlement in Escobar Partido, Argentina

== See also ==
- Matthew (name)
