= Japanese Garden, Montevideo =

Park in Montevideo, Uruguay

Coordinates: 34°51′11.9″S 56°11′56″W

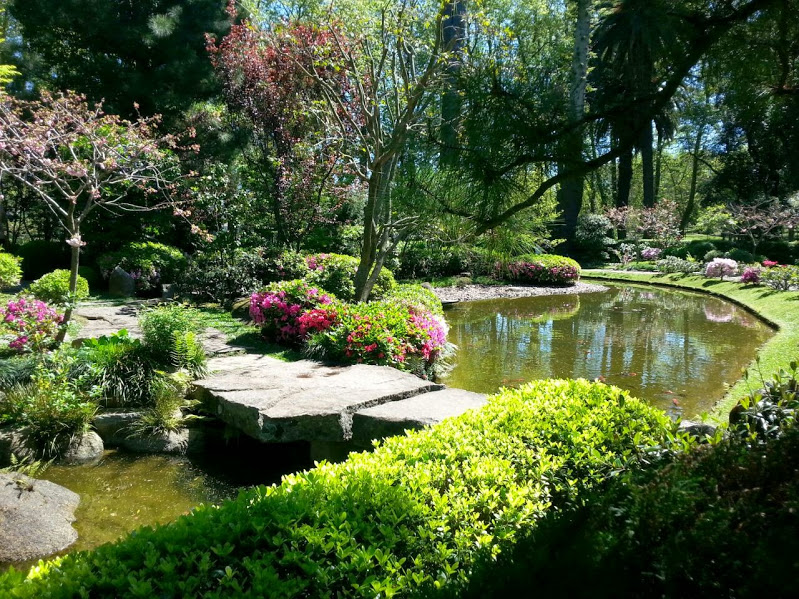
Japanese Garden of Montevideo.

The Japanese Garden of Montevideo (Spanish: Jardín Japonés de Montevideo; Japanese: モンテビデオの日本庭園') is located in the Prado neighbourhood of Montevideo, behind the Juan Manuel Blanes Museum.

It was donated by Japan as a memorial to the 80th anniversary of the establishment of diplomatic relations between both countries, and inaugurated on 24 September 2001 by Princess Sayako.

A wooden plaque, with calligraphy by then-Prime Minister Junichiro Koizumi, bears the inscription 平成苑 "Heisei Garden", being the year 13 of the Heisei Era (reign of Akihito) at the time of the inauguration.

== See also ==
- Buenos Aires Japanese Gardens
- Japanese Garden, Belén de Escobar
- Shofuso Japanese House and Garden
- Portland Japanese Garden
- Japanese Tea Garden of San Francisco
- Hammond Museum and Japanese Stroll Garden
- Roji-en Japanese Gardens
