= Rodrigo Damín =

Argentine footballer (born 1998)

Personal information
- Date of birth: 1 April 1998 (age 28)
- Place of birth: Garín, Argentina
- Height: 1.80 m (5 ft 11 in)
- Position: Forward

Youth career
- Tigre

Senior career*
Years	Team	Apps	(Gls)
2017–2019	Almirante Brown	7	(0)
- * Club domestic league appearances and goals as of 07:03, 25 April 2019 (UTC)

Rodrigo Damín (born 1 April 1998) is an Argentine professional footballer who plays as a forward.

== Career ==
Damín played in the youth academy of Tigre. In 2017, Damín joined Primera B Metropolitana side Almirante Brown. He made his professional debut on 20 May against Comunicaciones, prior to featuring again in their 2016–17 season finale against Deportivo Español on 30 June.

== Career statistics ==
As of 25 April 2019.

Appearances and goals by club, season and competition
Club	Season	League			Cup		League Cup		Continental		Other		Total	
Club	Season	Division	Apps	Goals	Apps	Goals	Apps	Goals	Apps	Goals	Apps	Goals	Apps	Goals
Almirante Brown	2016–17	Primera B Metropolitana	2	0	0	0	—		—		0	0	2	0
Almirante Brown	2017–18	Primera B Metropolitana	1	0	0	0	—		—		0	0	1	0
Almirante Brown	2018–19	Primera B Metropolitana	4	0	0	0	—		—		0	0	4	0
Career total			7	0	0	0	—		—		0	0	7	0
