= Escobar Partido =

Escobar Partido de Escobar
- Department
- location of Escobar Partido in Greather Buenos Aires
- Coordinates: 34°21′S 58°46′W
- Country: Argentina
- Seat: Belén de Escobar

Government
  - Intendant: Ariel Sujarchuk (Homeland Force)

Area
  - Total: 277 km^{2} (107 sq mi)

Population
  - Total: 178,155
  - Density: 643/km^{2} (1,670/sq mi)
- Demonym: escobarense
- Postal Code: B1625
- IFAM: BUE036
- Area Code: 348
- Website: escobar.gob.ar

Escobar Partido is a partido in the northern part of the Gran Buenos Aires urban area, in Buenos Aires Province, Argentina.

The provincial subdivision has a population of about 178,000 inhabitants in an area of 277 km^{2} (107 sq mi), and its capital city is Belén de Escobar, which is 32 km (20 mi) from Buenos Aires.

Escobar is home to a significant population of Japanese Argentines.

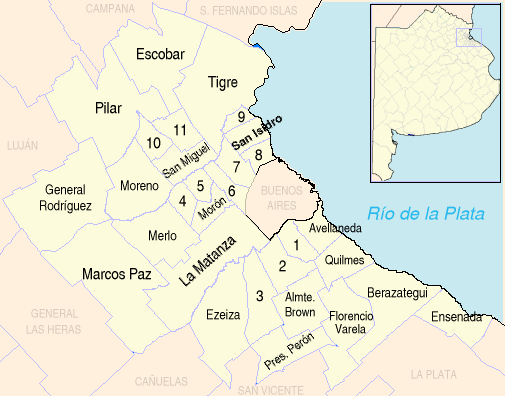
Barrios of Buenos Aires urban area

== Settlements ==
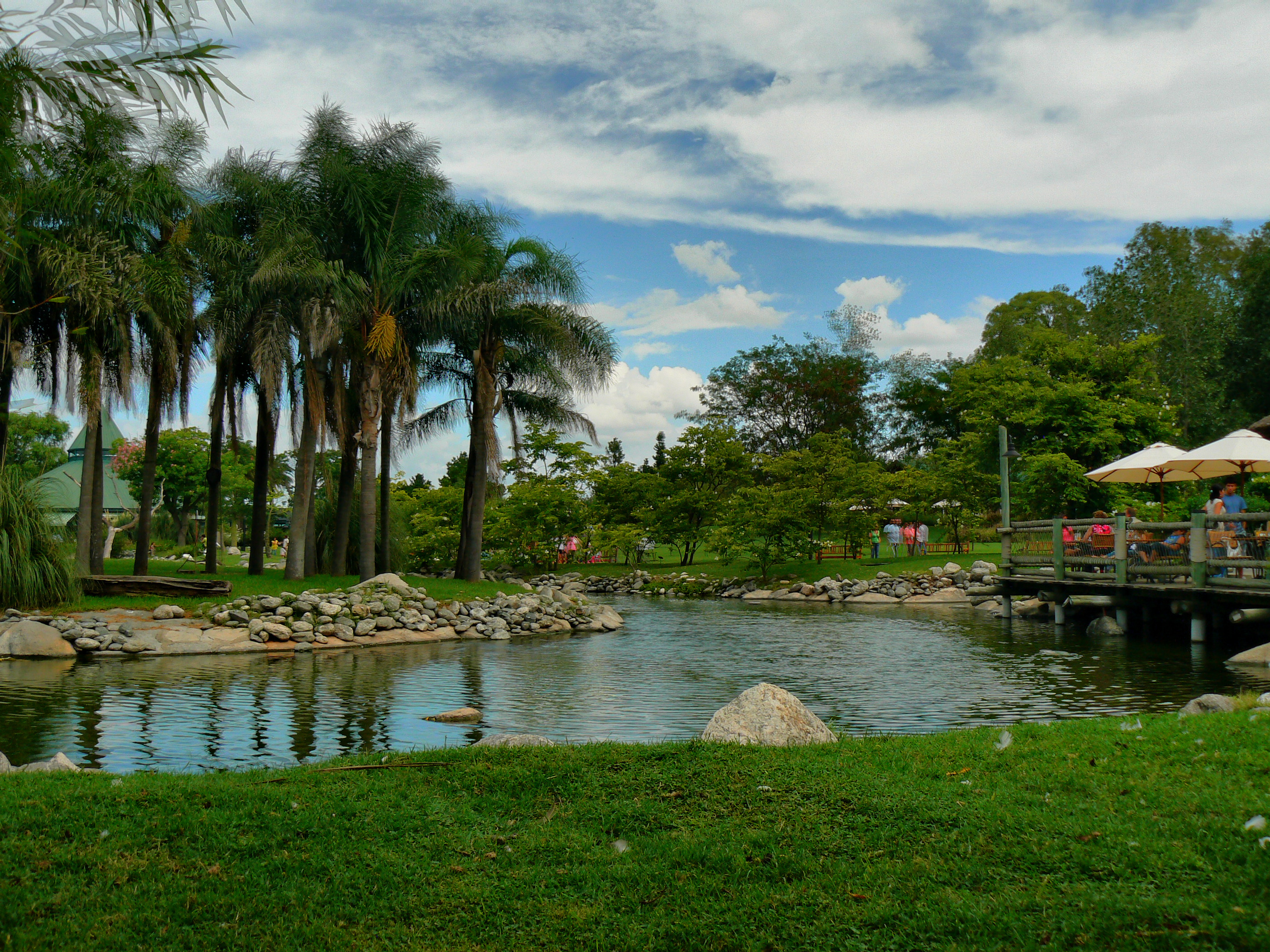
Temaikèn Safari Park

- Belén de Escobar
- Garín
- Ingeniero Maschwitz
- Matheu
- Savio
- 24 de Febrero
- Loma Verde
- Paraná
