= Mario Alberto Ishii =

Argentine politician

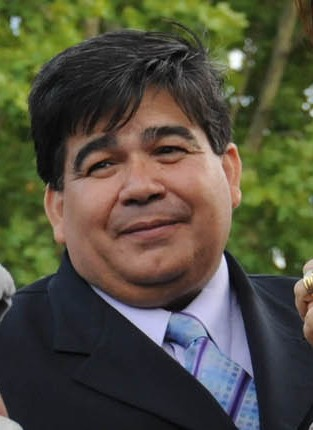

Mayor of José C. Paz
- Incumbent
- Assumed office 10 December 2015
- Preceded by: Carlos Urquiaga
- In office 10 December 1999 – 10 December 2013
- Preceded by: Rubén Oscar Glaria
- Succeeded by: Carlos Urquiaga

Provincial Senator of Buenos Aires
- In office 10 December 2013 – 10 December 2015
- Constituency: First Electoral Section

Personal details
- Born: June 22, 1951 (age 74) Buenos Aires, Argentina
- Party: Justicialist Party

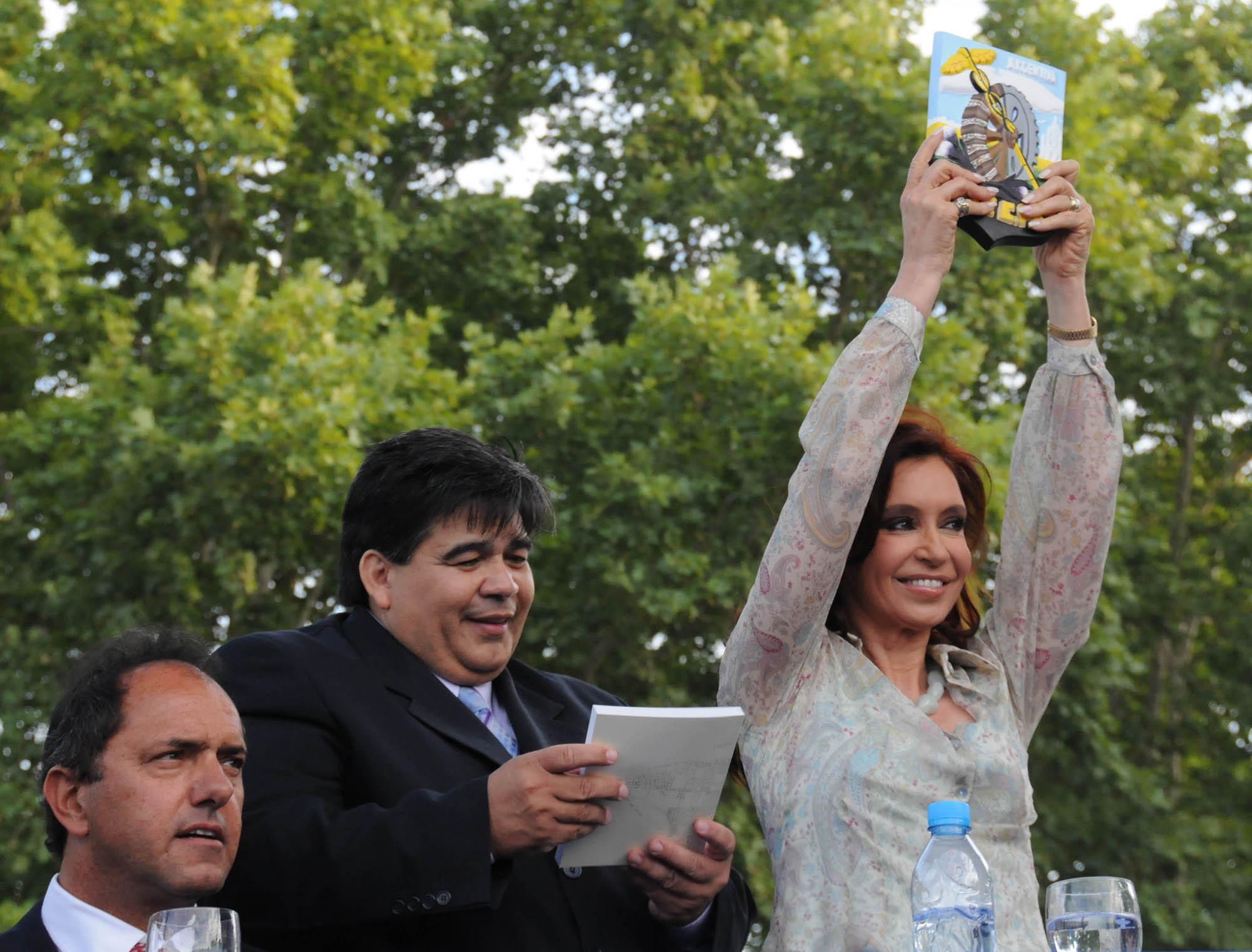
Daniel Scioli, Mario Alberto Ishii (center) and Cristina Fernández de Kirchner at the official ceremony (January 17, 2008).

Mario Alberto Ishii (born 22 June 1951) is an Argentine politician of the Justicialist Party, currently serving as intendente (mayor) of José C. Paz, a partido in the Greater Buenos Aires metropolitan area. He is popularly known as El Japonés ("the Japanese") due to his Japanese heritage.

He was first elected mayor in 1999, and continued to be so until 2013, when he was elected to the as Buenos Aires Province Senate. In 2015, he was once again elected mayor.

In August 2020 a video was leaked, showing him accusing city workers of selling drugs in municipal ambulances and saying he had to cover for them, causing major national media attention and a legal case to be opened. He then claimed that when he said "drugs" he had meant "medicines".
