= Japanese Argentines =

日系アルゼンチン人 (Japanese) Nipo-argentino (Spanish)
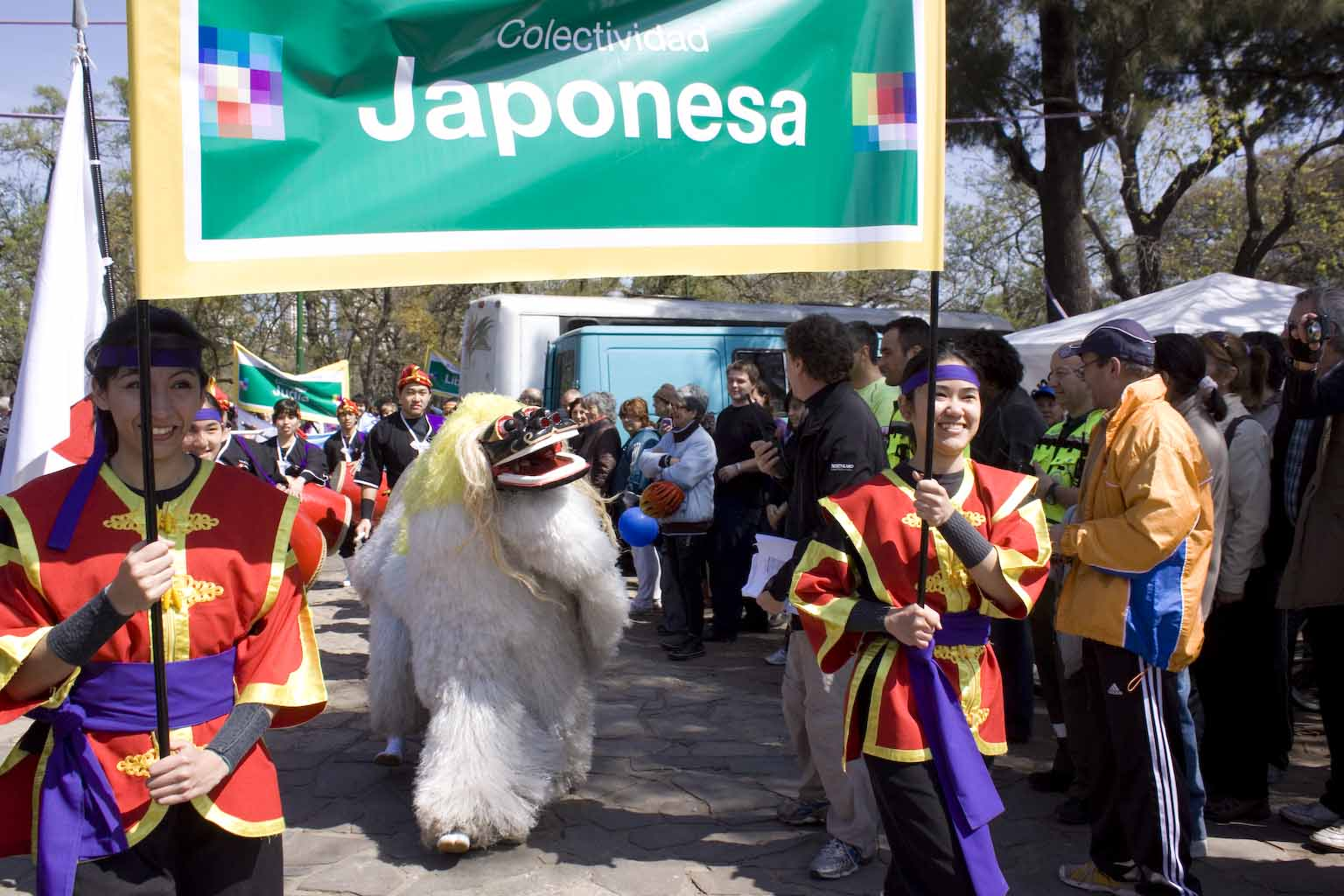
- Japanese Argentines during the Day of the immigrants in Buenos Aires.

Total population
- 115,000 (by ancestry, 2020)

Regions with significant populations
- Greater Buenos Aires, La Plata Partido, Escobar Partido, Misiones Province

Languages
- Rioplatense Spanish · Japanese (minority)

Religion
- Buddhism · Roman Catholicism · Shinto

Related ethnic groups
- Japanese diaspora · Asian Argentines

Japanese Argentines are Argentine citizens of Japanese ancestry, comprising Japanese immigrants and their descendants born in Argentina. Japanese migration to Argentina began in 1908 with the arrival of immigrants from Okinawa and Kagoshima. The first Japanese entered the country via Brazil and succeeding groups of immigrants tended to reach Argentina through the neighboring nations.

In the pre-war years, Japanese Argentines were concentrated in urban small businesses, especially dry cleaning and cafes in Buenos Aires (see es: Café El Japonés), while some worked as domestic servants, factory workers and longshoremen. A minority of Japanese Argentines also engaged in horticulture, floriculture and fishery. There is an important Japanese community in the city of Belén de Escobar where they settled and specialised in floriculture.

Between the 1960s and 1970s, more Japanese immigrants arrived in the country. Many were attracted by the economic opportunities in agriculture. According to the Ministry of Foreign Affairs of Japan, as of 2020 there are 115,000 descendants and 11,440 Japanese nationals in Argentina.

== History ==
There were about 6,000 ethnic Japanese in Argentina in the late 1930s. The Argentine government was friendly with Japan up until the twilight of World War II, when pressure from the United States and the losses by the Axis Powers resulted in loss of diplomatic relations and the Argentine government declaring war against Japan and therefore causing Japanese institutions in the country to close. In the post-World War II period, most ethnic Japanese decided to stay in Argentina. Additional immigration occurred around the 1950s.

The dominant group of Japanese immigrants to Argentina were from the Ryukyu Islands.

== Culture ==
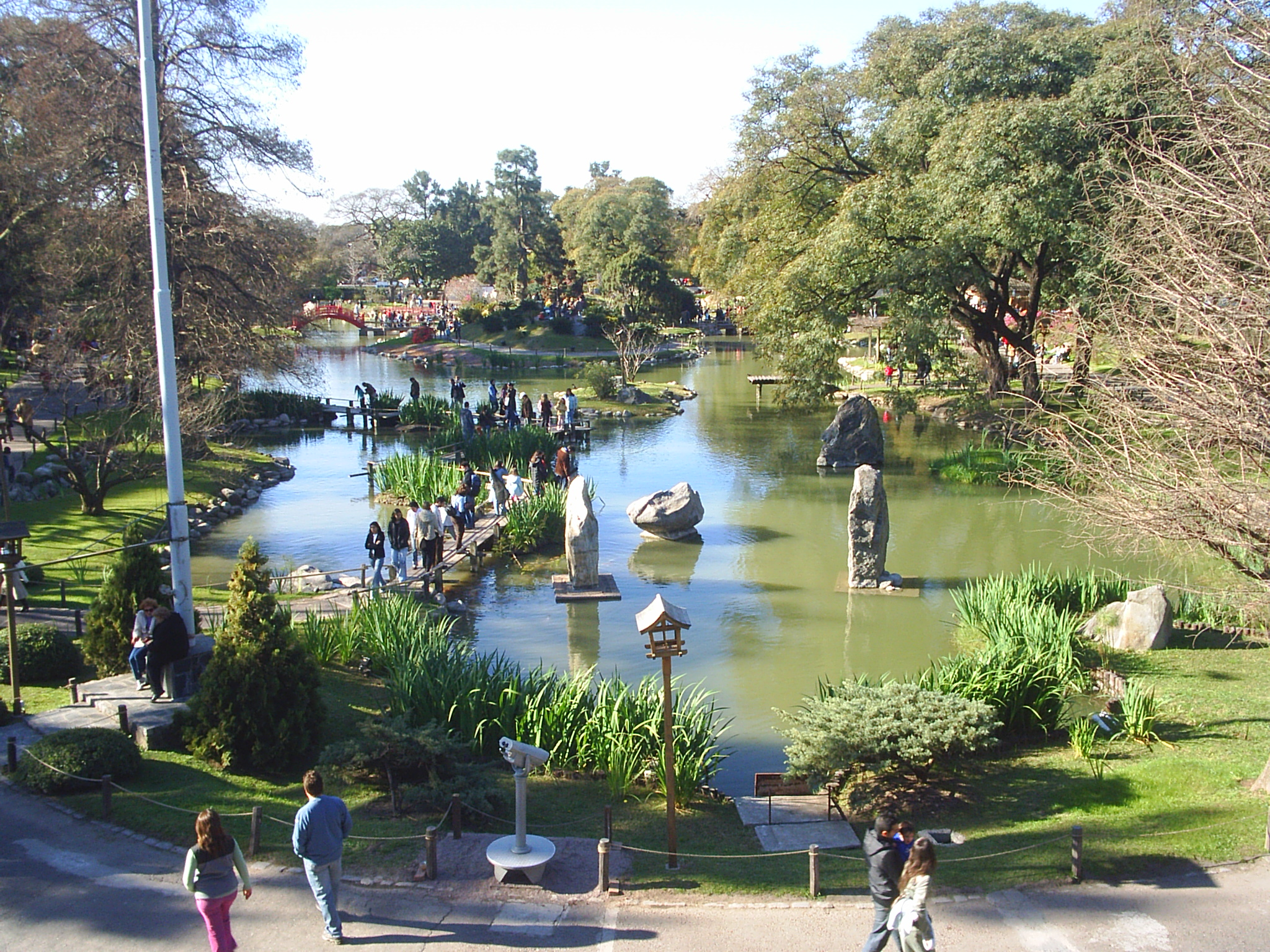
Buenos Aires Japanese Gardens. The gardens were inaugurated on occasion of a State visit to Argentina by then-Crown Prince Akihito and Princess Michiko of Japan.

In regions with a substantial Japanese population in Buenos Aires, institutions such as Japanese associations and Japanese language schools were established by early Japanese immigrants.

During the United States–Japanese conflict of World War II, Argentina remained neutral until 1943, which limited the impact of war on the lives of Japanese Argentines. However, restrictions included the ban on meetings, Japanese education, newspaper publication, as well as a freeze on Japanese assets—which remained effective between 1944 and 1946.

There are notable Japanese gardens in Palermo (Buenos Aires) and Belén de Escobar.

== Education ==
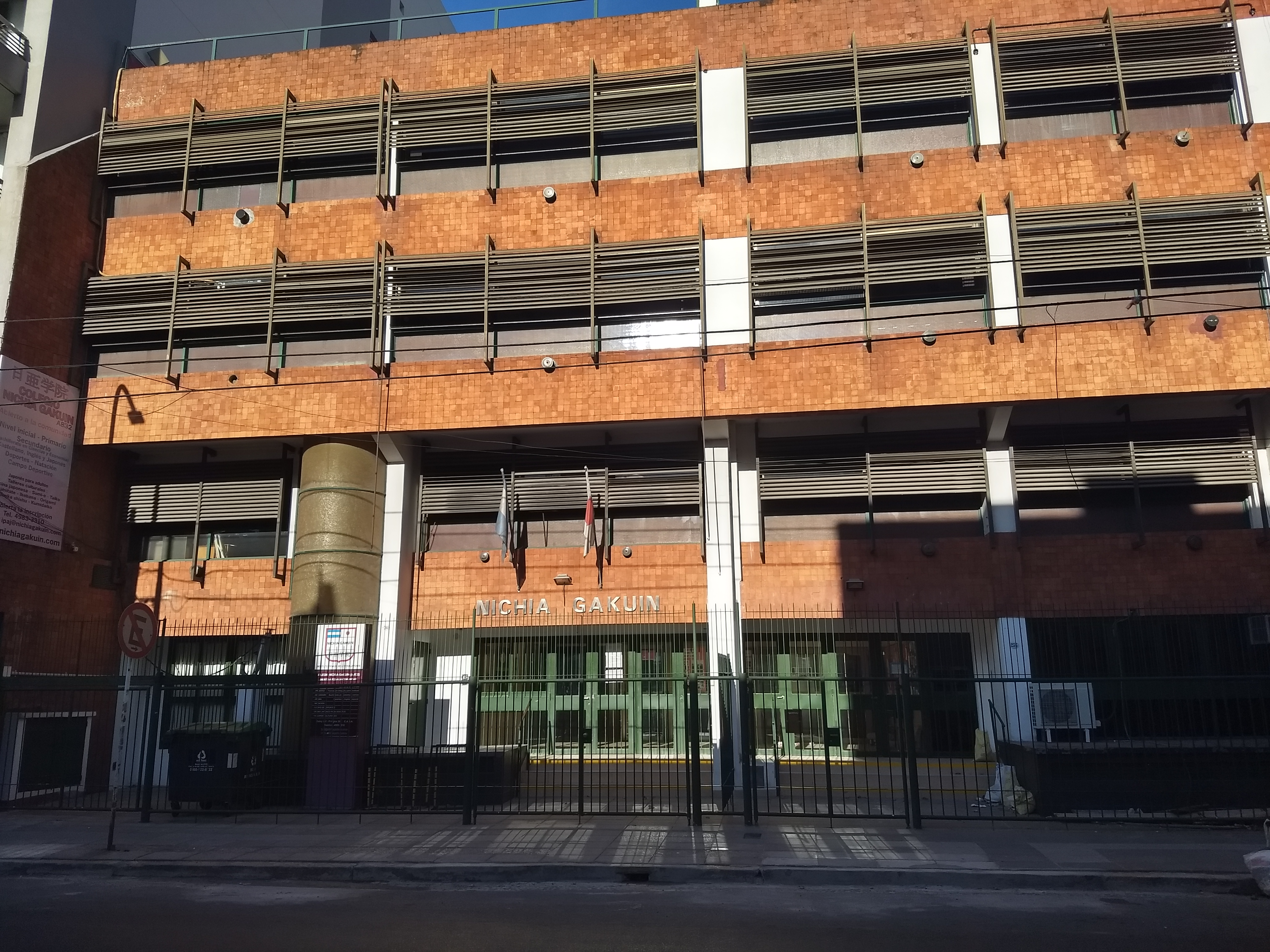
Instituto Privado Argentino-Japonés or Nichia Gakuin in Buenos Aires serves Argentines of Japanese descent.

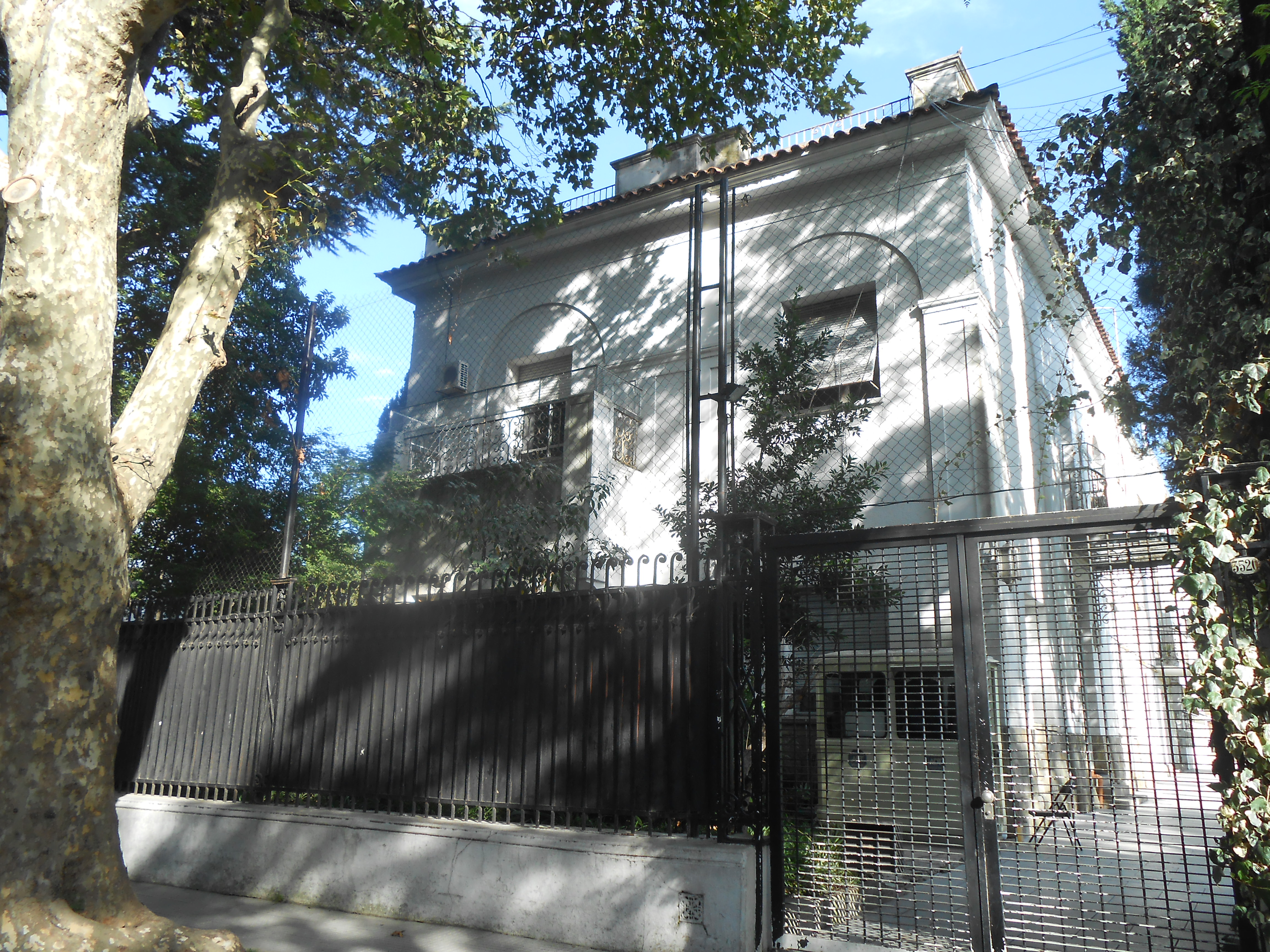
Asociación Cultural y Educativa Japonesa/Colegio Japonés en Buenos Aires (ブエノスアイレス日本人学校) is the school serving Japanese citizens living in Buenos Aires.

There is a bilingual Spanish-Japanese private school, Instituto Privado Argentino-Japonés or Nichia Gakuin. The origins date from 1922.

The Asociación Cultural y Educativa Japonesa/Colegio Japonés (ブエノスアイレス日本人学校, Buenosu Airesu Nihonjin Gakkō), an overseas school for Japanese national children, is located in Buenos Aires and has elementary and junior high school education. It was established in 1961.

== Media ==
Prior to World War II, there were four Japanese newspapers in Argentina; the United States government influenced the Argentine government to close these publications in 1944.

== Notable individuals ==
- Mario Alberto Ishii, politician and mayor of José C. Paz
- María Kodama, writer with a Japanese father
- Jessica Michibata, model active in Japan
- Sonoya Mizuno, actress
- María Eugenia Suárez, actress
- Alicia Terada, politician and congresswoman
- Laura Russo, politician and congresswoman

== See also ==
- Argentina–Japan relations
- Japanese diaspora
- Immigration to Argentina
- South America Hongwanji Mission
- Asian Latin Americans
- Japanese Brazilians
- Café El Japonés
