= Ingeniero Maschwitz =

- Town

- Location in Buenos Aires Province Ingeniero Maschwitz (Argentina)
- Coordinates: 34°22′S 58°45′W
- Country: Argentina
- Province: Buenos Aires
- Partido: Escobar
- Elevation: 4 m (13 ft)

Population (2001 census [INDEC])
  - Total: 12,482
- CPA Base: B 1623
- Area code: +54 03488

Ingeniero Maschwitz, known simply as Maschwitz, is a town in the Escobar Partido of the Buenos Aires Province, Argentina. It forms part of the urban conurbation of Greater Buenos Aires. This is the small town where International evangelist Luis Palau was born.

== Attractions ==
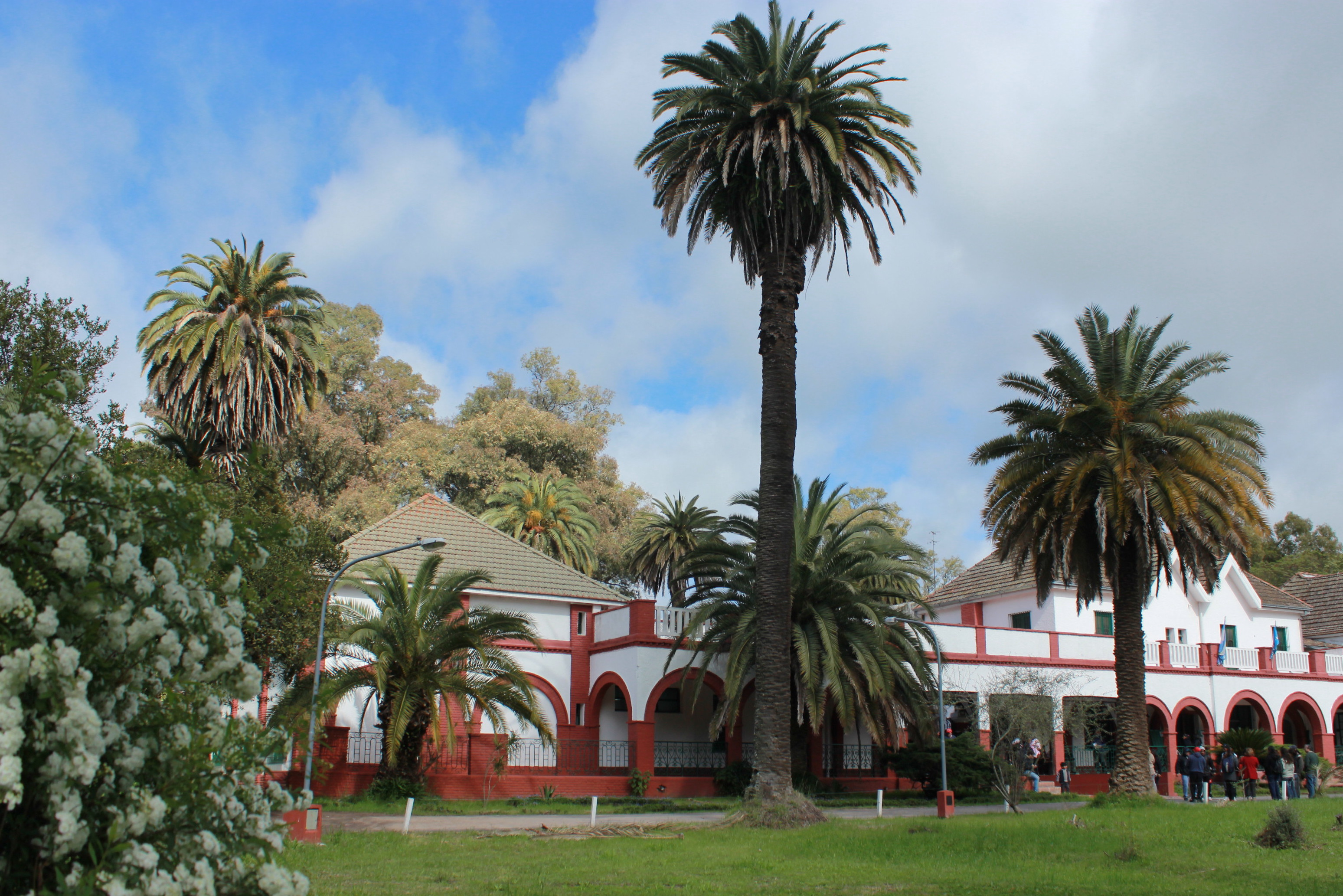
Estancia Villanueva

- Estancia Villanueva
- Papa Francisco Park
- Municipal museum
- Plaza Emilio Mitre
- Arenera bridge
- Ingeniero Maschwitz railway station
