= Japan–Uruguay relations =

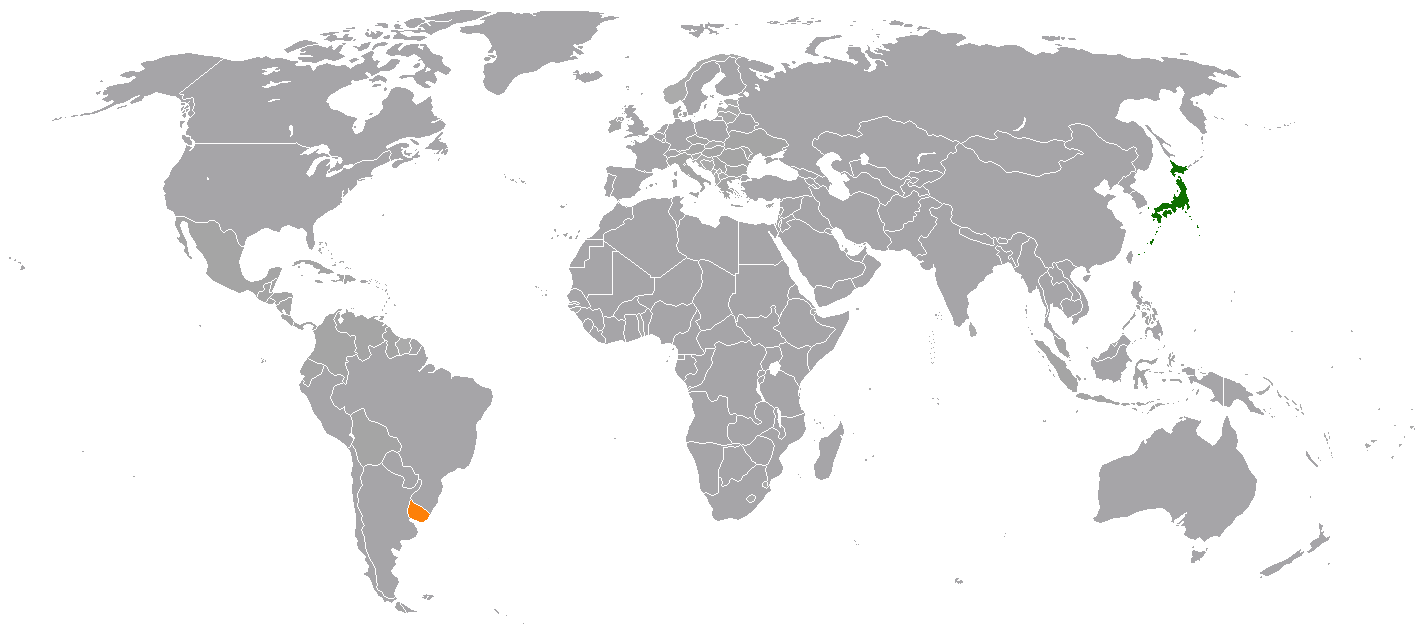
- Japan: Uruguay

Japan–Uruguay relations are foreign relations between Japan and Uruguay. Both countries are members of the United Nations and the World Trade Organization.

== History ==
In 1908, the first migrants from Japan arrived to Uruguay and settled in the country, primarily in Montevideo. In 1921, both nations established diplomatic relations. During World War II, Uruguay severed relations with Japan, however, diplomatic relations were re-established in 1952.

In 2001, Uruguayan President Jorge Batlle paid an official visit to Japan. That same year, Princess Sayako inaugurated a Japanese garden in Montevideo. In September 2008, Princess Takamado visited Uruguay to celebrate the 100th anniversary of Japanese emigration to Uruguay. Uruguayan President Tabaré Vázquez would pay official visits to Japan in 2009 and again in 2015.

In December 2018, Japanese Prime Minister Shinzō Abe paid an official visit to Uruguay, the first by a Japanese head-of-government. While in Uruguay, Prime Minister Abe met with President Vázquez and both leaders discussed the current relationship between both nations and the upcoming 100th anniversary of diplomatic relations between both nations in 2021.

On January 6, 2021, the Minister of Foreign Affairs of Japan, Toshimitsu Motegi, paid a visit to Uruguay to mark the centenary of the establishment of diplomatic relations between the two nations. During his stay in the country, he held meetings with his counterpart Francisco Bustillo and with President Luis Lacalle Pou.

== Bilateral agreements ==
Both nations have signed a few bilateral agreements such as an Agreement for the Promotion and Reciprocal Protection of Investments (2015), an Agreement for the Elimination of Double Taxation with respect to Taxes on Income and the Prevention of Tax Evasion and Avoidance (2019), and an Agreement for cooperation in simplified customs procedures and repression of the infringement of intellectual property rights and the smuggling of drugs, weapons and merchandise (2021).

== Resident diplomatic missions ==
- Japan has an embassy in Montevideo.
- Uruguay has an embassy in Tokyo.
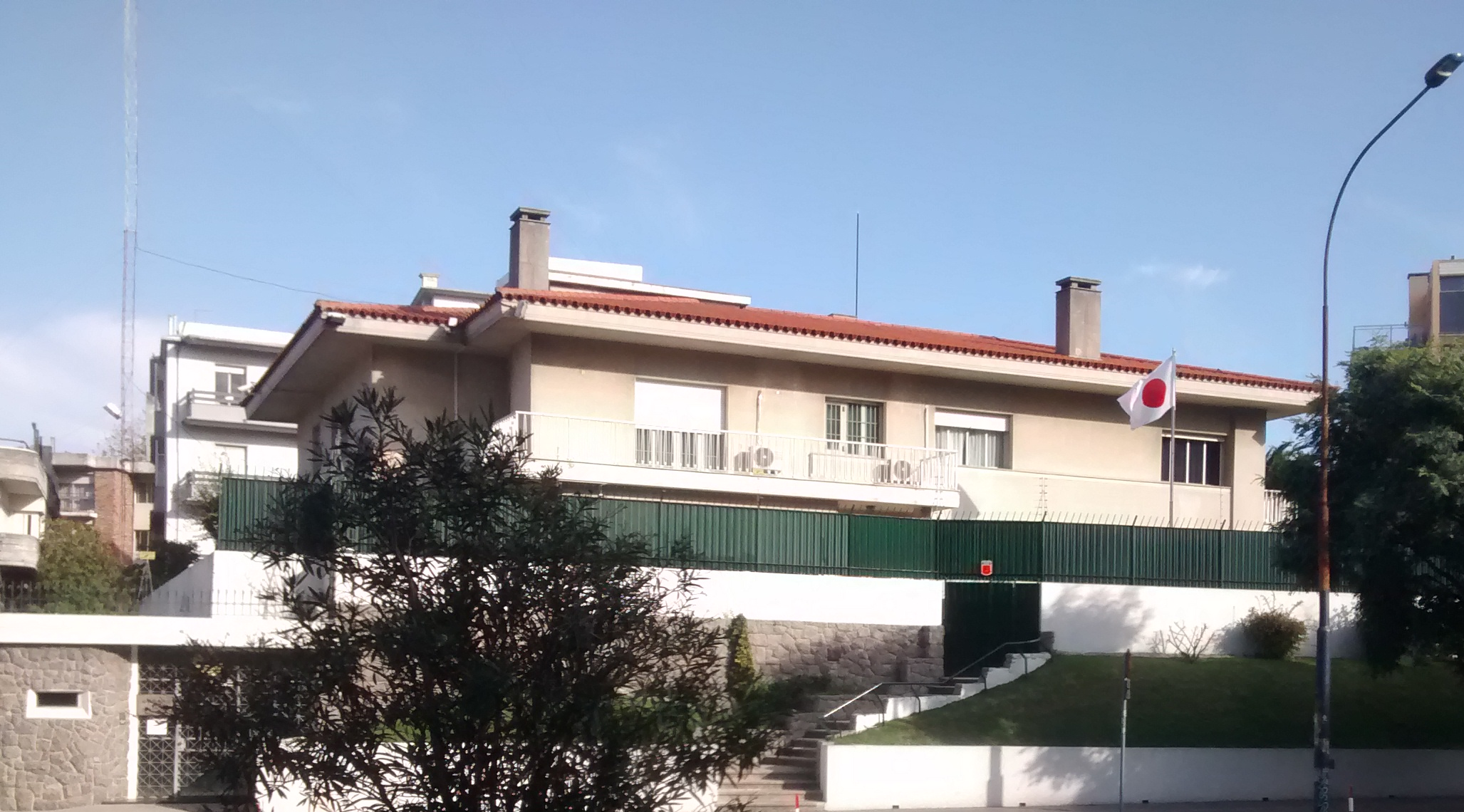
Embassy of Japan in Montevideo

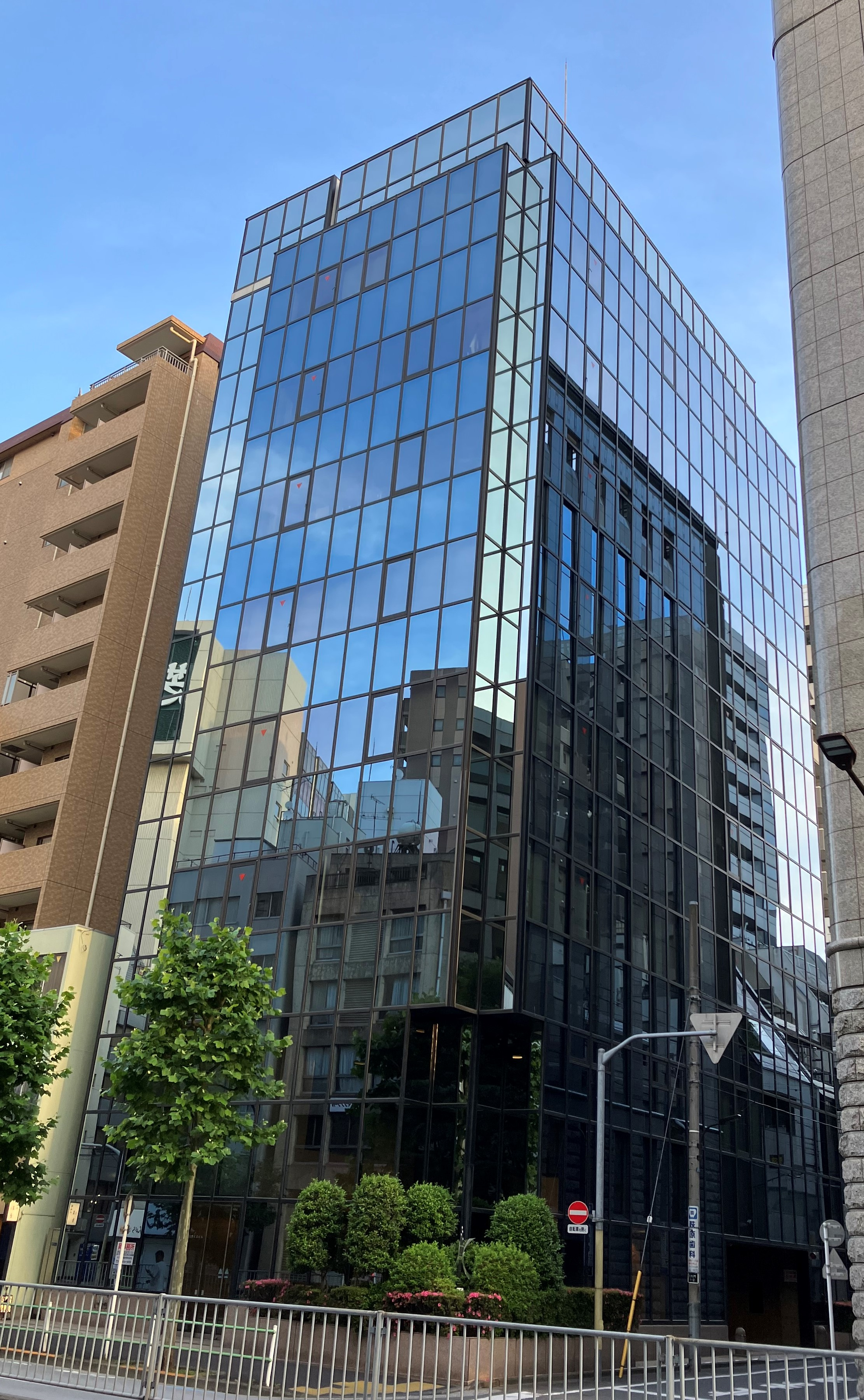
Embassy of Uruguay in Tokyo

== See also ==
- Foreign relations of Japan
- Foreign relations of Uruguay
- Japanese Uruguayans
