= Instituto Privado Argentino-Japonés =

- Nichia Gakuin 日亜学院

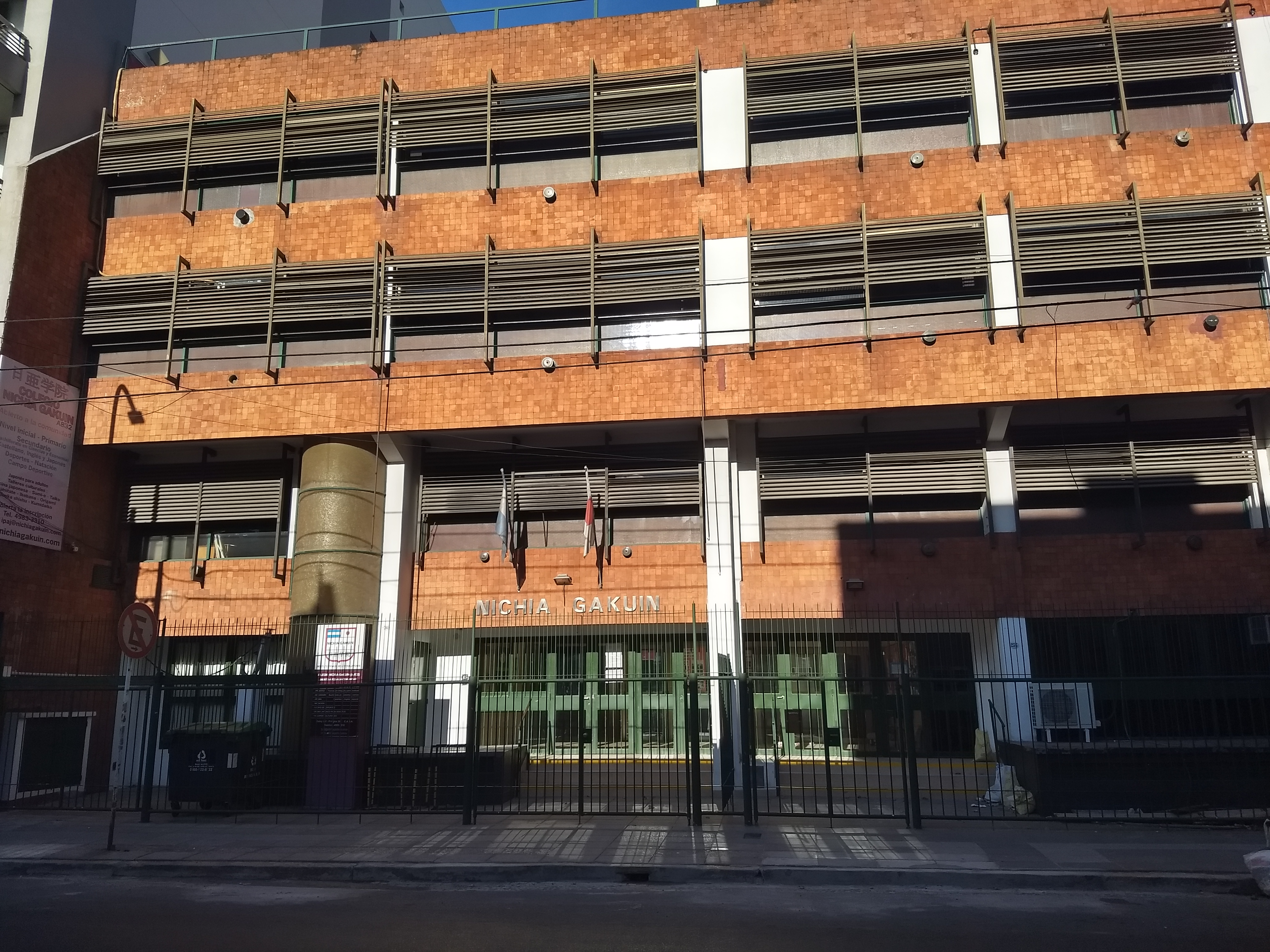

Location
- Yatay 261/Pringles 268; Buenos Aires; Argentina; 34.609494°S 58.42893600000002°W

Information
- Type: Private school
- Website: nichiagakuin.edu.ar

Instituto Privado Argentino-Japonés (IPAJ), also known as Nichia Gakuin (日亜学院), is a bilingual Spanish-Japanese elementary and middle school in Buenos Aires. It is the only school permitted by the Argentine Ministry of Education to require students to take Japanese, and it is the only bilingual Spanish-Japanese school in Buenos Aires. Its campus is located at Yatay 261 and Pringles 268 (two addresses for the same building) in the Almagro neighbourhood.

Ricardo Braginski of Clarín wrote that the school represented the community of Japanese descent in Buenos Aires.

== History ==
The origins date from 1922. The Nichia Gakuin school began offering courses in 1927 and the bilingual day school was first established in 1938. Its initial location was Patagones 84. Argentine authorities closed the school in January 1945 upon the Argentine government declaring war against Japan as part of World War II. It reopened in 1947 and took the formal name "Instituto Privado Argentino-Japonés" in 1978. It moved to its current Yatay campus in 1984.

== See also ==
- Japanese Argentine
- Buenos Aires Japanese Gardens
- Japanese Association of Rosario
