= Belén de Escobar =

City in Buenos Aires Province, Argentina

- City
- Location in Buenos Aires Province Belén de Escobar (Argentina)
- Coordinates: 34°20′S 58°49′W
- Country: Argentina
- Province: Buenos Aires
- Partido: Escobar
- Founded: March 4, 1877
- Elevation: 19 m (62 ft)

Population (2010 census [INDEC])
  - Total: 54,678
- CPA Base: B 1625
- Area code: +54 3488

Belén de Escobar (or Escobar) is a city in the urban conurbation of Greater Buenos Aires in Buenos Aires Province, Argentina. It is the administrative seat for Escobar Partido.

The city has an important Japanese Argentine population; its Japanese garden is a notable landmark.

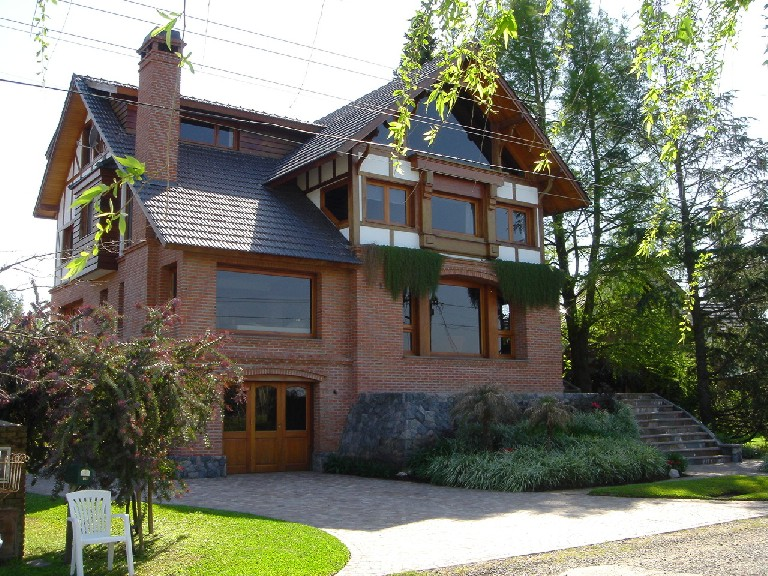
House in Belén de Escobar

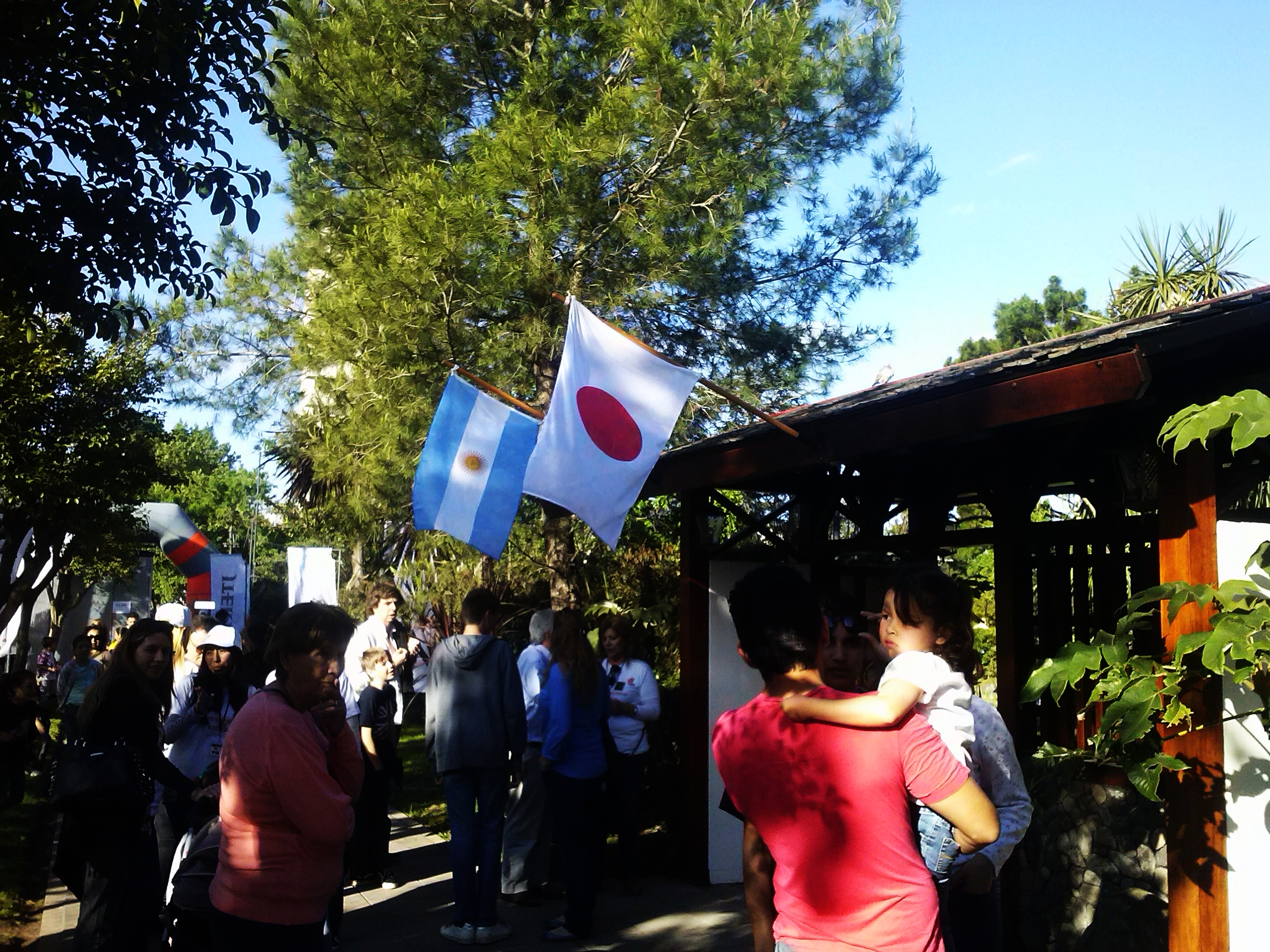
Entrance to the Japanese garden of Belén de Escobar
