= José C. Paz, Buenos Aires =

City in Buenos Aires Province, Argentina

José C. Paz
- City
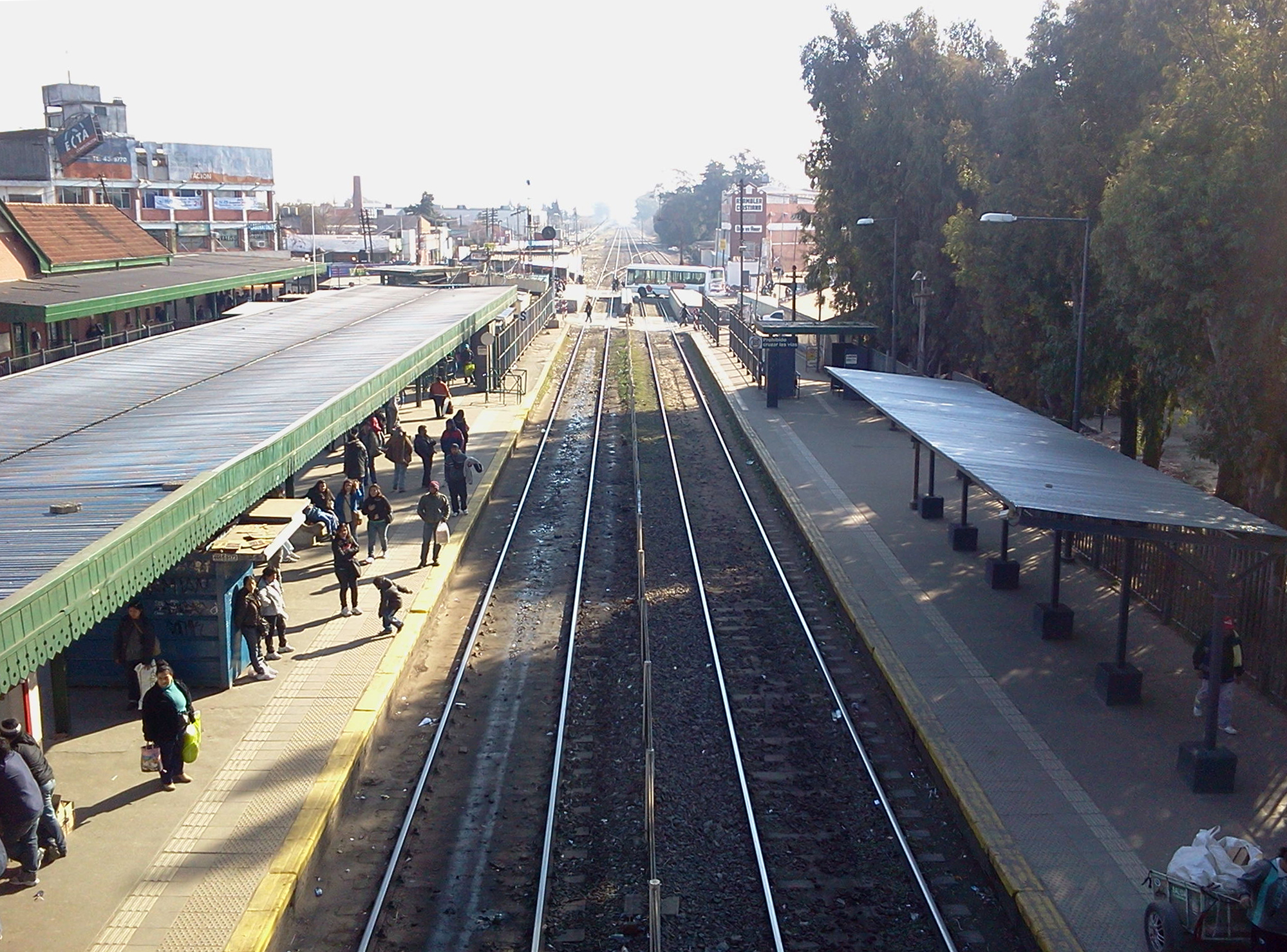

- Location in Greater Buenos Aires
- Coordinates: 34°31′S 58°46′W
- Country: Argentina
- Province: Buenos Aires
- Partido: José C. Paz
- Founded: July 13, 1913

Population (2001 census [INDEC])
  - Total: 216,637
- CPA Base: B 1665
- Area code: +54 2320

José C. Paz is a city, the capital of José C. Paz Partido, Buenos Aires Province, Argentina. It forms part of the Greater Buenos Aires urban area and is located around 35 km north-west of the Capital federal. It was named after José C. Paz (2 October 1842 – 10 March 1912), an Argentine journalist and diplomat.
