= Buenos Aires Japanese Gardens =

Japanese garden in Buenos Aires, Argentina

Coordinates: 34°34′31.2″S 58°24′33.8″W

The Buenos Aires Japanese Gardens (Spanish: Jardín Japonés de Buenos Aires; Japanese: ブエノスアイレス日本庭園) are a public space administered by the non-profit Japanese Argentine Cultural Foundation in Buenos Aires, Argentina. They are among the largest Japanese gardens in the world outside Japan.

== Overview ==
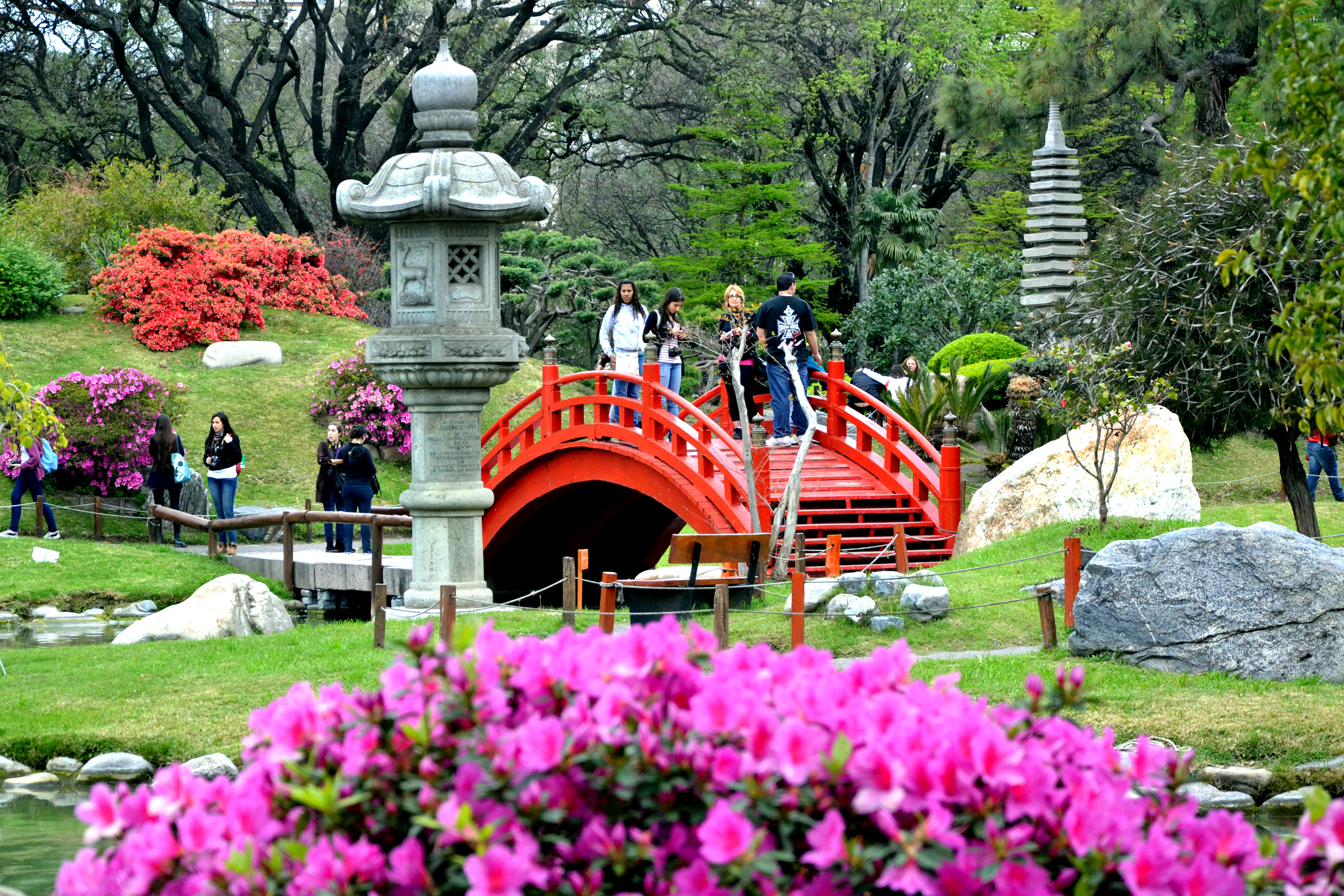
Japanese Garden in Buenos Aires

Following the demolition of a similar, smaller garden in the Retiro area, the Japanese Argentine Cultural Foundation secured a title to 2 hectares (4.9 acres) on the northeast corner of the city's extensive Parque Tres de Febrero for the purpose of creating a replacement. Completed in 1967, the gardens were inaugurated on occasion of a State visit to Argentina by then-Crown Prince Akihito and Princess Michiko of Japan.

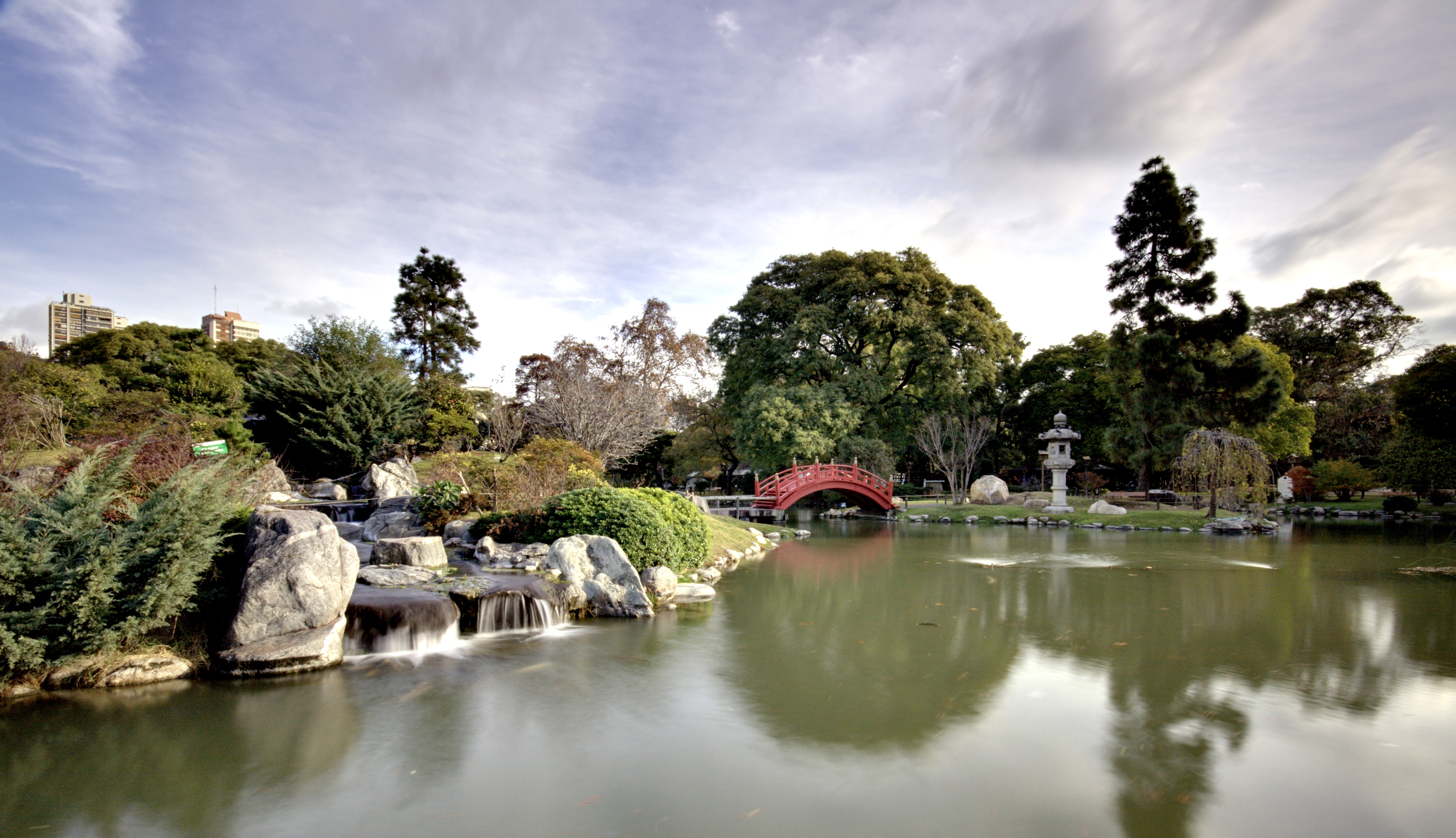
View of the carp lake.

Its entrance on Figueroa Alcorta Avenue led to the gardens, a cultural center, restaurant, a greenhouse known for its collection of bonsai trees and a gift shop featuring an extensive selection of Asian garden seeds, as well as craftwork made by artisans on the grounds. The central lake is crossed by the Divine Bridge, traditionally representing entry into Heaven and by the Truncated Bridge, leading to an island where Japanese medicinal herbs are grown.

The lake is surrounded by flora of Japan, such as sakura, katsura, momiji and azalea. The park, however, also features complementing species native to South America, notably tipa and floss silk trees. The lake itself is populated with carp. Small numbers of epiphytic bromeliads of genus Tillandsia can be seen as well as one orchid of the widespread and diverse genus Oncidium.

The park is also graced by a Japanese Peace Bell and a large ishidoro (石灯ろう Japanese stone lanterns central to their Buddhist traditions), as well as numerous other granite sculptures. A Japanese Buddhist Temple is maintained on the grounds and the Institute also hosts regular cultural activities for the general public.

Alfred Zucker designed an open-air theatre for the park.

== See also ==
- Japanese Argentine
- Instituto Privado Argentino-Japonés
- Japanese Association of Rosario
- Japanese Garden, Belén de Escobar
