= Japanese Garden, Belén de Escobar =

Japanese garden in the Argentine city Belén de escobar

Coordinates: 34°21′08″S 58°47′51″W

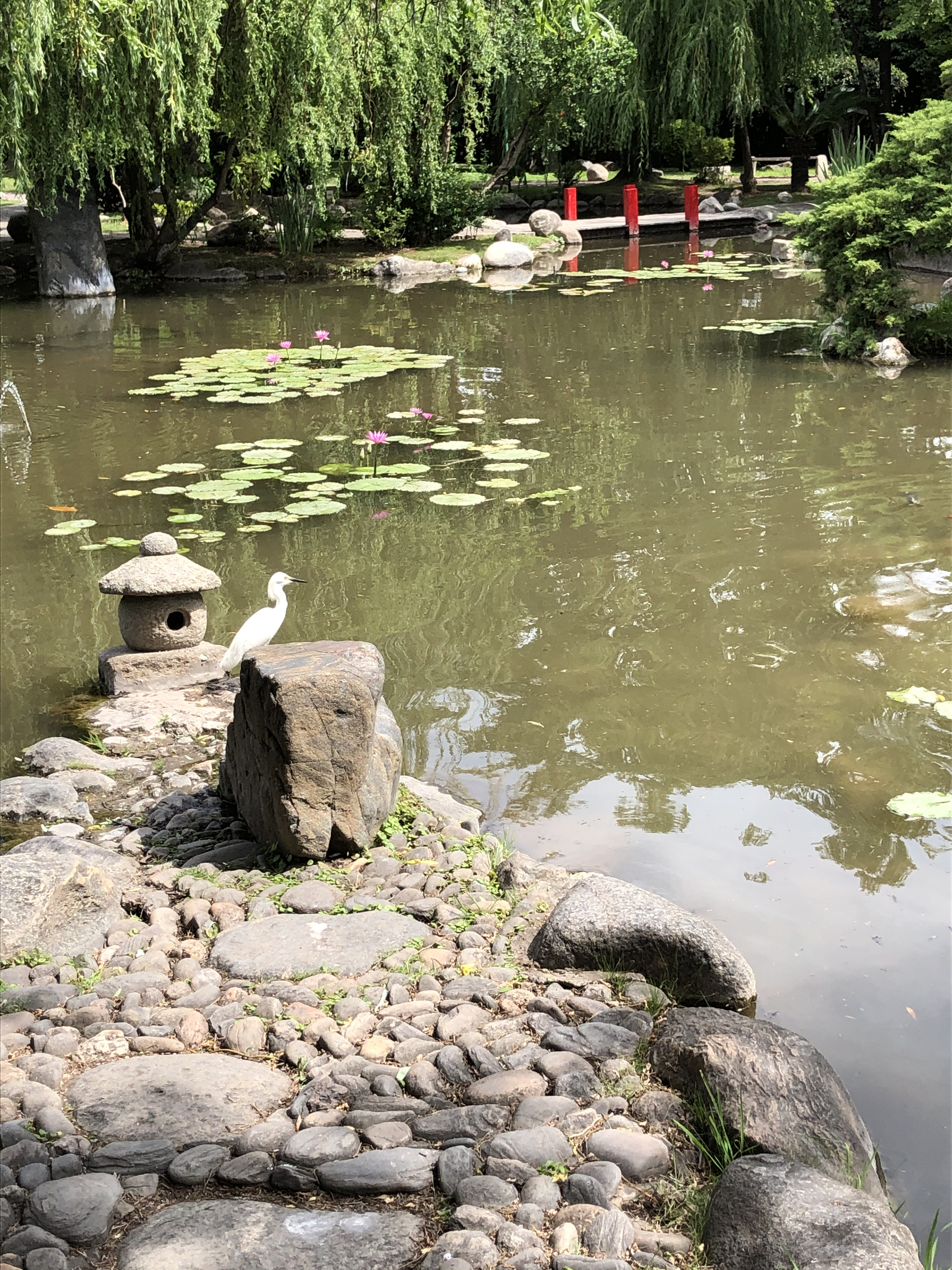
Japanese Garden, Belén de Escobar, in 2019.

The Japanese Garden of Belén de Escobar (Spanish: Jardín Japonés de Belén de Escobar; Japanese: ベレンデエスコバルの日本庭園) is located in Belén de Escobar, Buenos Aires Province, Argentina.

Established in 1969, it was a donation of the local Japanese community and built according to designs by the engineer Yasuo Inomata. In 2019 it was expanded to include a tea house and a zen space.

== See also ==
- Buenos Aires Japanese Gardens
- Japanese Argentines
