= Garín, Argentina =

Garín
- Town
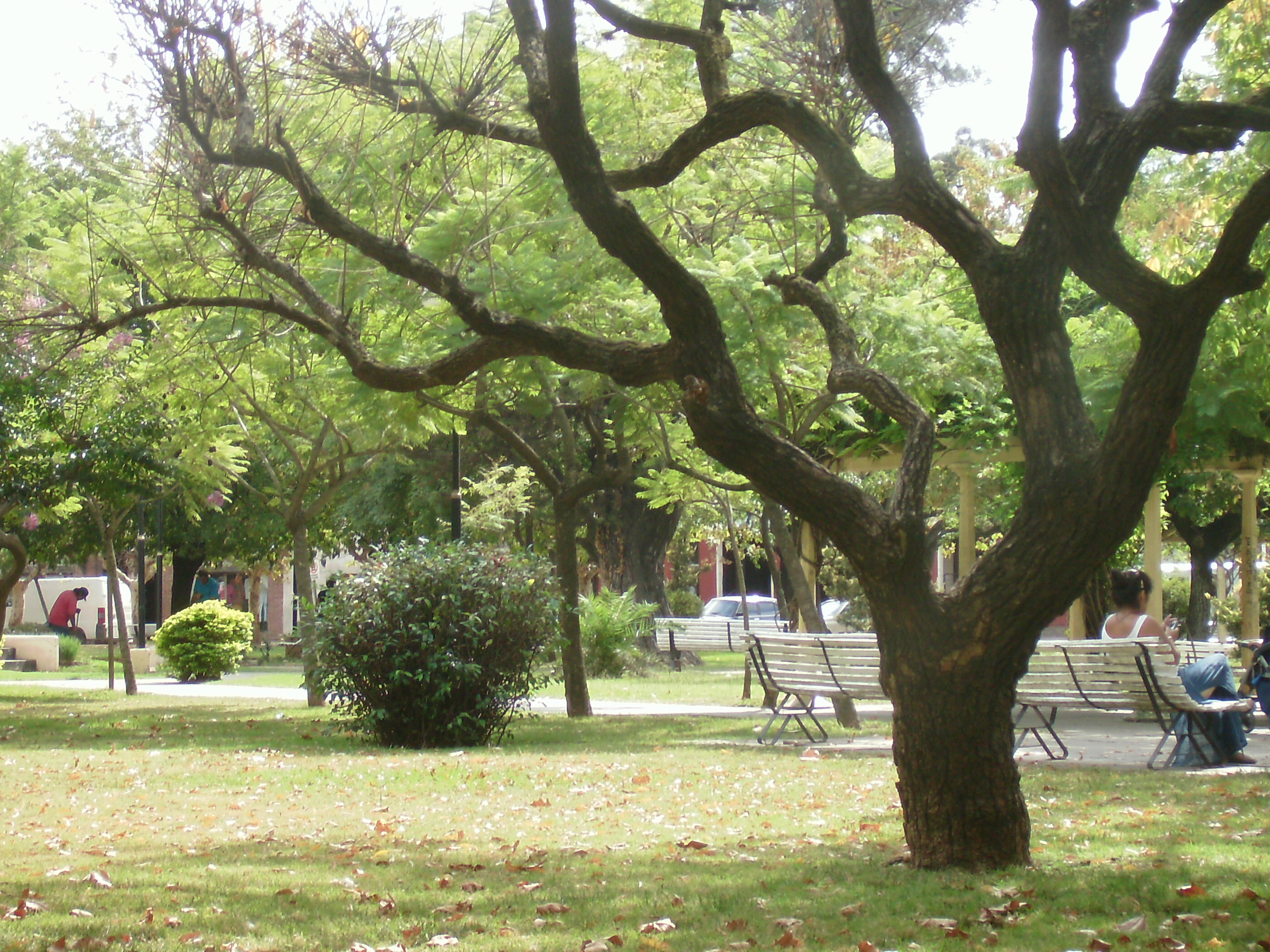
- Plaza central
- Interactive map of Garín
- Coordinates: 34°25′S 58°45′W
- Country: Argentina
- Province: Buenos Aires
- Partido: Escobar
- Elevation: 13 m (43 ft)

Population (2001 census [INDEC])
  - Total: 59,335
- CPA Base: B 1619
- Area code: +54 348

Garín is a town in Escobar Partido of Buenos Aires Province, Argentina. It is located in the north of the provincia de Buenos Aires

== Attractions ==
- Museo de la ciudad de Garín. (Garín city museum)
- Plaza Central. (Central Park)
