= Matheu, Buenos Aires =

- Location in Buenos Aires Province Matheu, Buenos Aires (Argentina)
- Coordinates: 34°22′S 58°50′W
- Country: Argentina
- Province: Buenos Aires
- Partido: Escobar
- Elevation: 19 m (62 ft)

Population (census 2001)
  - Total: 19,964
- CPA Base: B1627
- Area code: +54 ..

Matheu is a town in the Escobar Partido of the Buenos Aires Province, Argentina.
