= Almagro, Buenos Aires =

Almagro
- Neighborhood
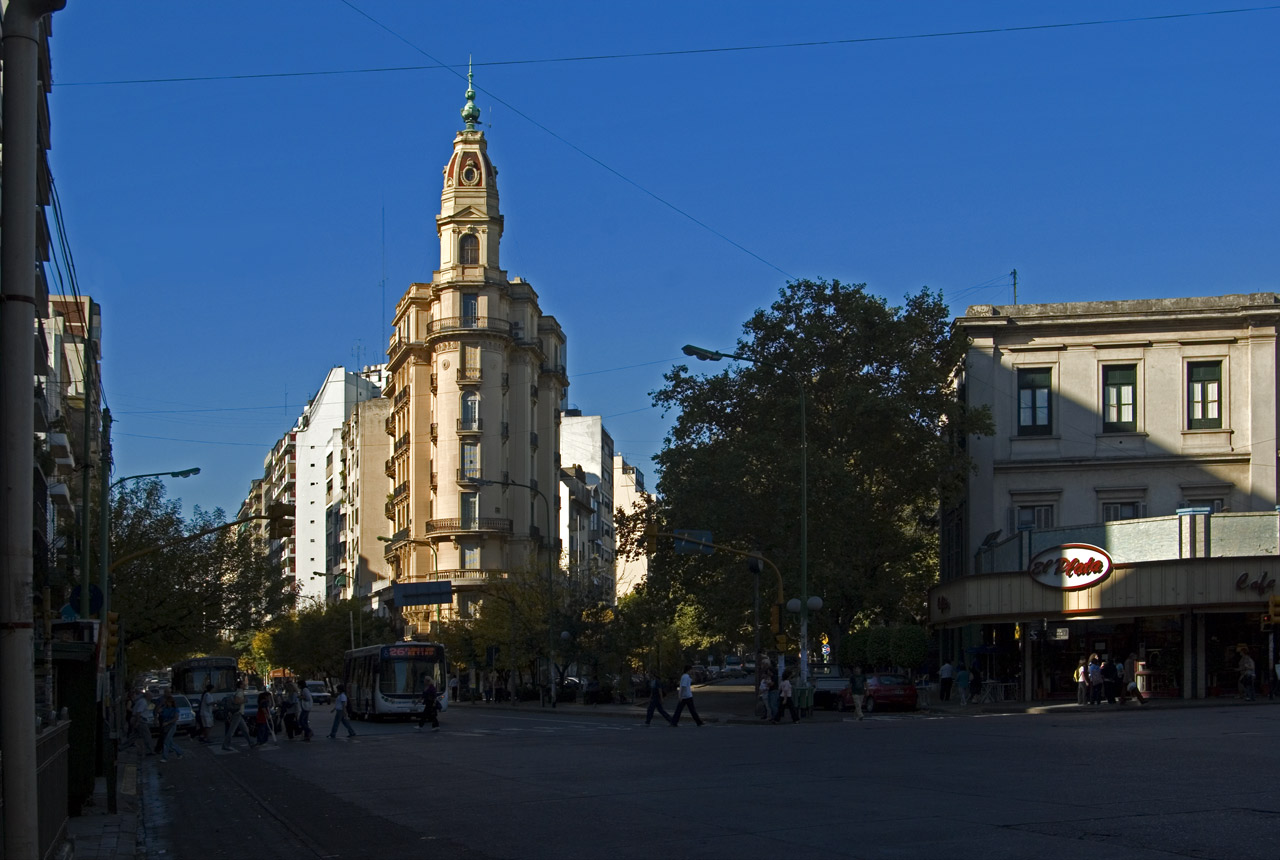
- Corner of Rivadavia and Yrigoyen Avenues

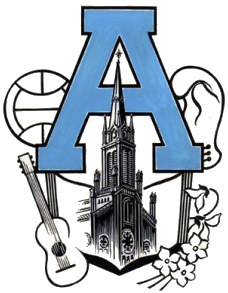
- Emblem
- Interactive map of Almagro
- Country: Argentina
- Autonomous city: Buenos Aires
- Comuna: C5
- Important sites: Hospital Italiano · Federación de Box · Club Almagro

Area
  - Total: 4.1 km^{2} (1.6 sq mi)

Population (2001)
  - Total: 138,942
  - Density: 34,000/km^{2} (88,000/sq mi)
- Time zone: UTC-3 (ART)

Almagro (Spanish pronunciation: [alˈmaɣɾo]) is a barrio or neighbourhood of Buenos Aires, Argentina.

The neighbourhood is delimited by La Plata avenue and Río de Janeiro street to the west, Independencia avenue to the south, Sánchez de Bustamante, Sánchez de Loria and Gallo streets to the east, and Córdoba/Estado de Israel avenues to the north.

Almagro features strong commercial activity along its avenues, and has a high population density due to the many high-rise buildings erected along the railway line. The sectional government of the 6th circuit, which includes Almagro and Boedo, is located on Díaz Vélez avenue opposite Centenario park.

== History ==
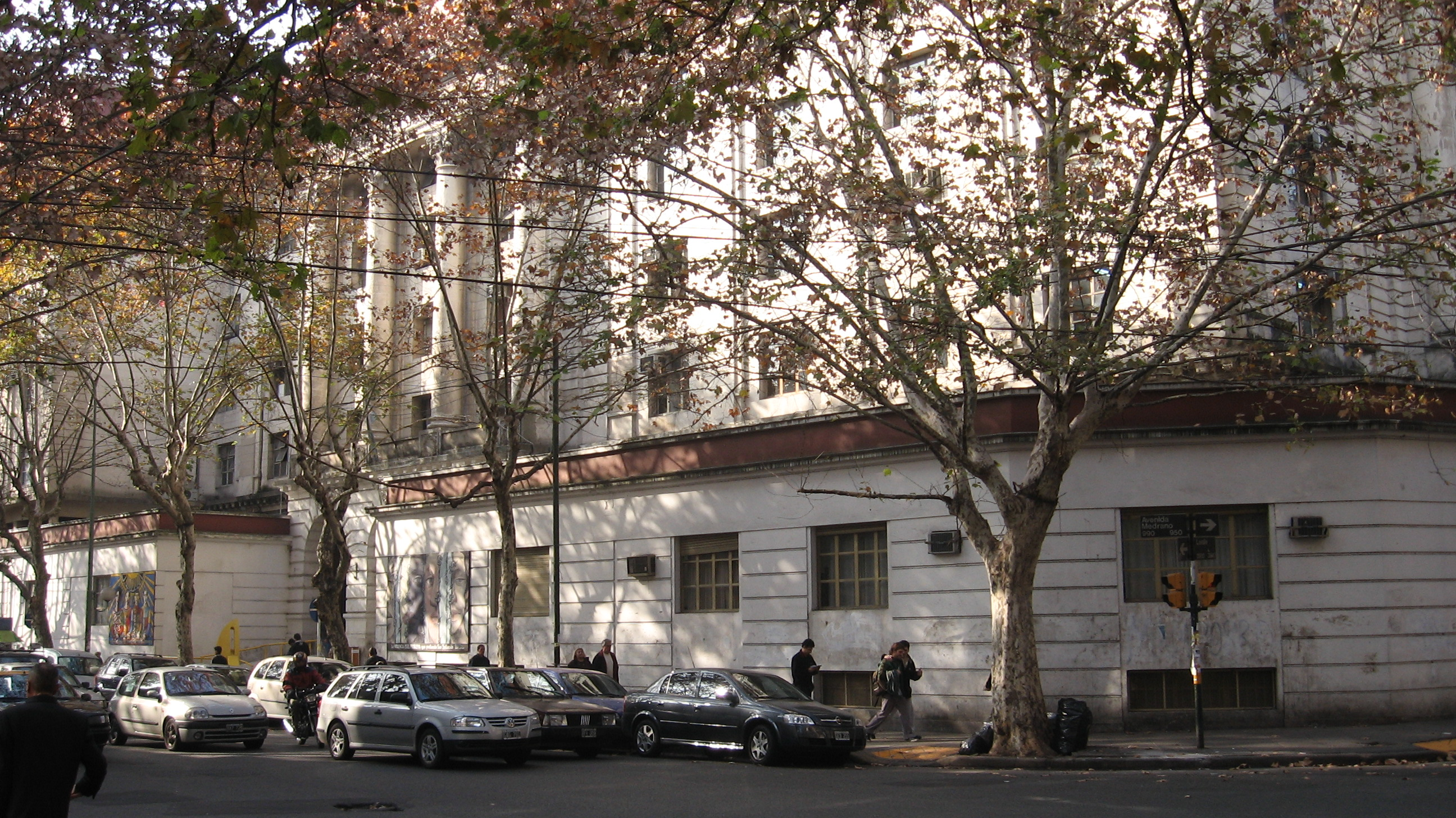
National Technological University, main campus.

In the 18th century, what is now the western part of Almagro belonged to Portuguese merchant Carlos de los Santos Valente and then to his estate. The eastern and northern sections were in the possession of Spaniard Juan María de Almagro y de la Torre, a barrister. The Argentine revolutionary government confiscated Almagro's lands, only to return them to him in 1820. Both Santos Valente and Almagro managed agricultural establishments, and did not favor any kind of urban development.

During the 19th century, most of the neighbourhood was occupied by dairy farms and brick factories. Almagro and Caballito were located on the road between Buenos Aires and the city of Flores. In 1880, Almagro was officially incorporated into the Federal district.

The neighbourhood came into its own around 1900, following the erection of the San Carlos parish church in 1878, the introduction of the tramway, and the massive immigration (Almagro was settled mostly by Basques and Italians).

Rapid urbanization brought about the conventillos (immigrant hotels). The assimilation of immigrants into the local culture was quick, and Almagro became the birthplace of many famous tangos. Due to its proximity to the Abasto market, singer Carlos Gardel was a frequent visitor, and in 1930 he recorded a tango named Almagro.

Many Almagro institutions became relevant in the Buenos Aires landscape:

- The Colégio Pio IX (or Pio IX Secondary School), whose alumni includes famous Tango singer Carlos Gardel, Blessed Ceferino Namuncurá, Argentine President Arturo Illia and distinguished engineers like Curiosity Rover, and other Mars NASA missions, Chief Engineer for the Guidance, Navigation, and Control system Miguel San Martín.
- The Las Violetas coffee house, opened in 1884, was a renowned meeting-place. Closed down in 1998 and reopened in 2001, it preserves the glamour of its golden days.
- The Argentine Boxing Federation hall on Castro Barros street was the venue of many important matches.
- The Mariano Moreno and Mariano Acosta schools were noted for their high educational standards

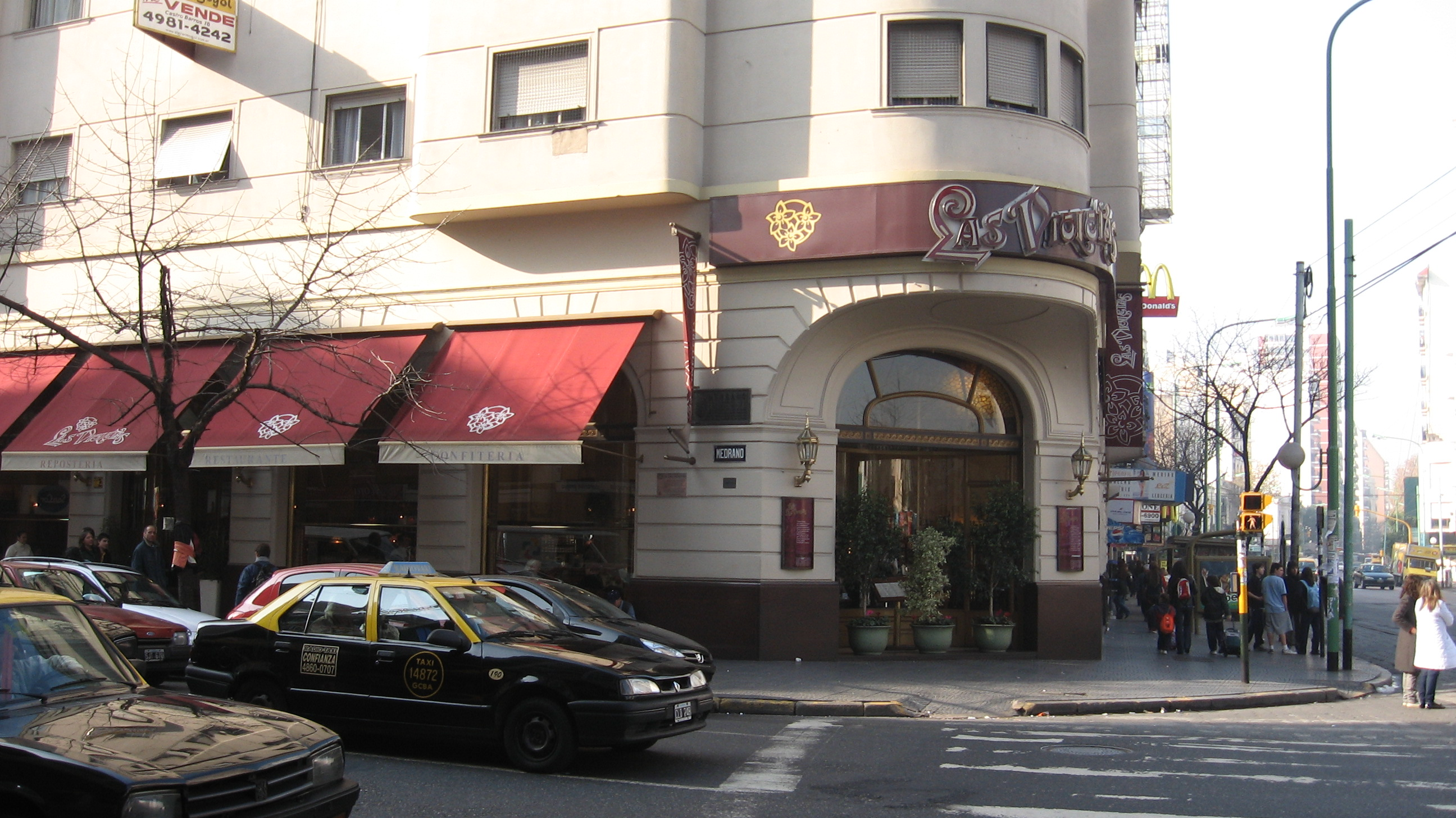
Las Violetas Café.

In the 1950s, the Buenos Aires campus of the Universidad Tecnológica Nacional (National Technological University) was built on Lavalle and Medrano streets. To accommodate the growing number of students, the faculty of Humanities ("Filosofía y Letras") of Buenos Aires University was relocated to Puán street during the 1980s.

Hospital Italiano on Gascón street is one of the main private hospitals in the city. The city's Dentistry Hospital is located on Muñiz street. There is also a Library for blind people on the intersection of Lezica and Medrano.

Although many music and dance venues cater to all tastes, Almagro is a stronghold of tango. During his last years, composer and bandleader Osvaldo Pugliese relocated to Almagro and oversaw the creation of the Casa del Tango (Tango House) complex on Guardia Vieja street.

Among Almagro's residents of note were boxer Luis Ángel Firpo, poet Alfonsina Storni, and physician and politician Juan B. Justo.

== Education ==
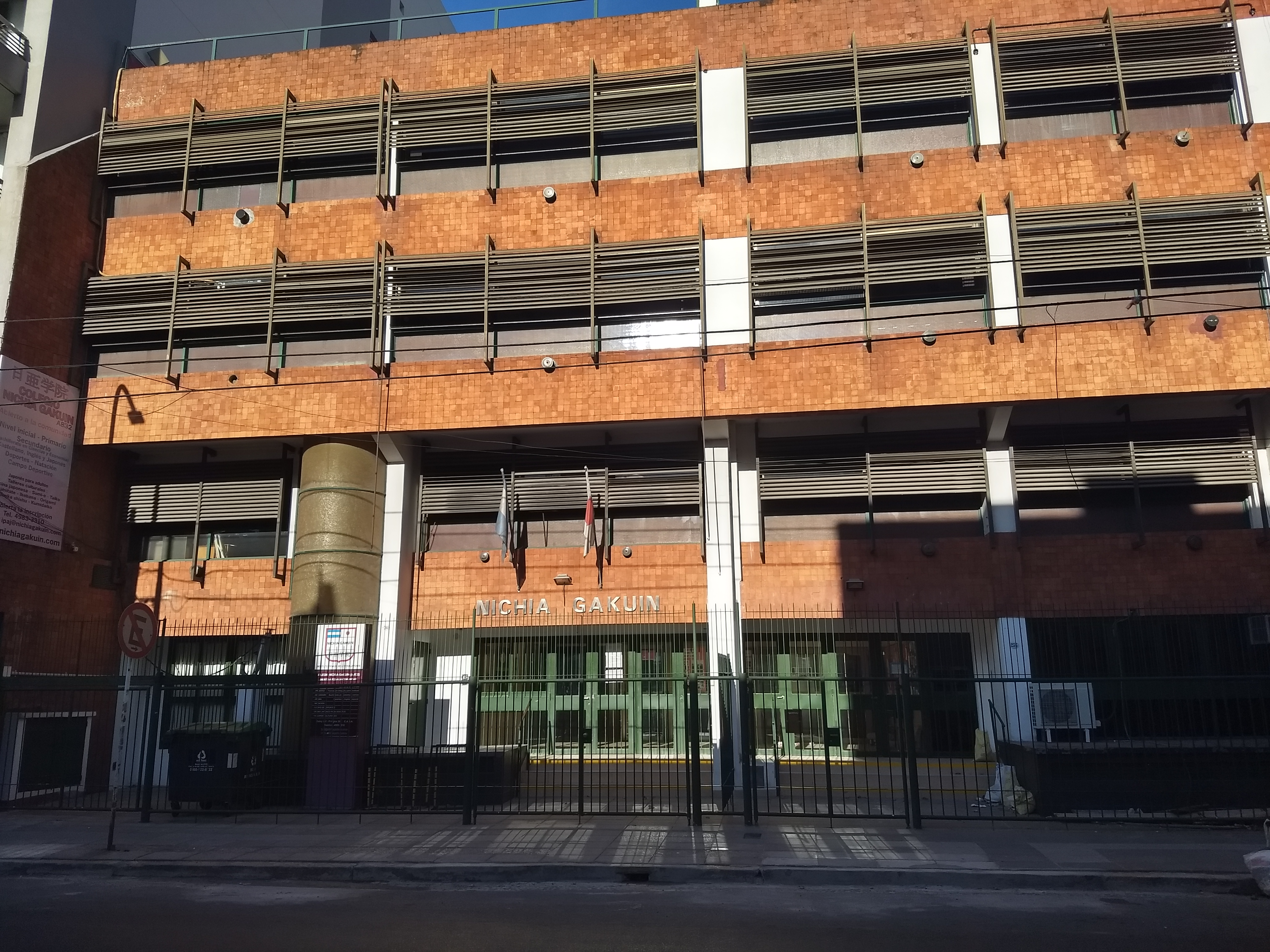
Instituto Privado Argentino-Japonés or Nichia Gakuin

Instituto Privado Argentino-Japonés or Nichia Gakuin, a private elementary and middle school, is located at Yatay 261 and Pringles 268 (two addresses for the same building) in Almagro.

== Transportation ==
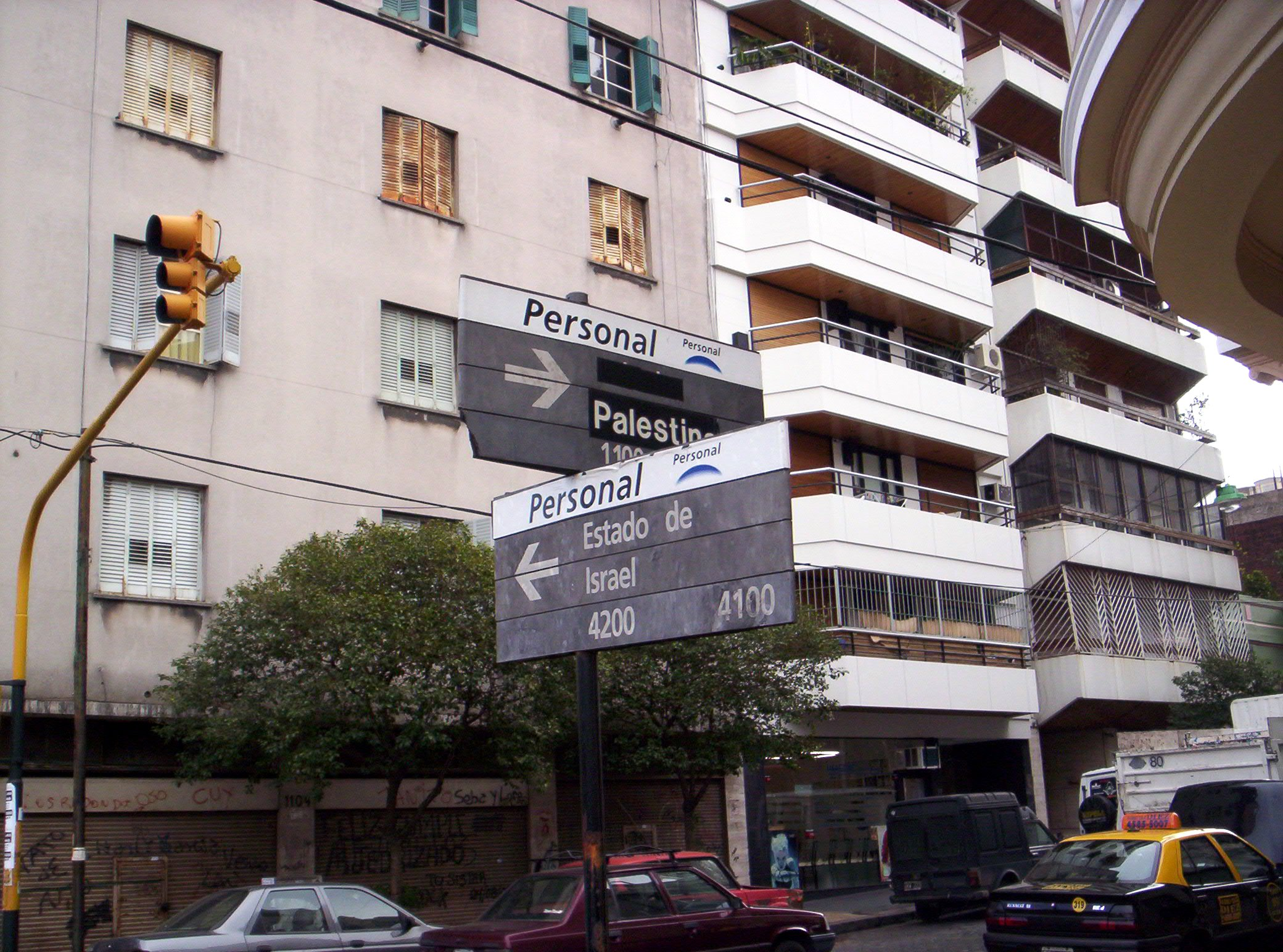
Israel and Palestine Streets meet at an Almagro intersection.

Westbound traffic is served by Independencia, Rivadavia, and Córdoba/Estado de Israel avenues.

Eastbound traffic is served by Corrientes, Díaz Vélez, and Belgrano avenues.

There are no major north-south avenues, even though Medrano, Salguero and Boedo streets carry heavy traffic.

Almagro has access to two lines of the subte (subway): the (Subte A) along Rivadavia and the (Subte B) along Corrientes.

The westbound Sarmiento train line crosses Almagro but does not stop within the limits of the neighbourhood.

Important bus lines are the 19, 128, 160, and 168.

== Sports ==
The neighbourhood was the birthplace of San Lorenzo de Almagro, which relocated to nearby Boedo. The remaining major institution, Club Almagro has its facilities on Medrano street. Its football (soccer) team was relegated from the first division in 2005. It is also the headquarters of the Argentine Boxing Federation.

== Patrimonio and Heritage ==
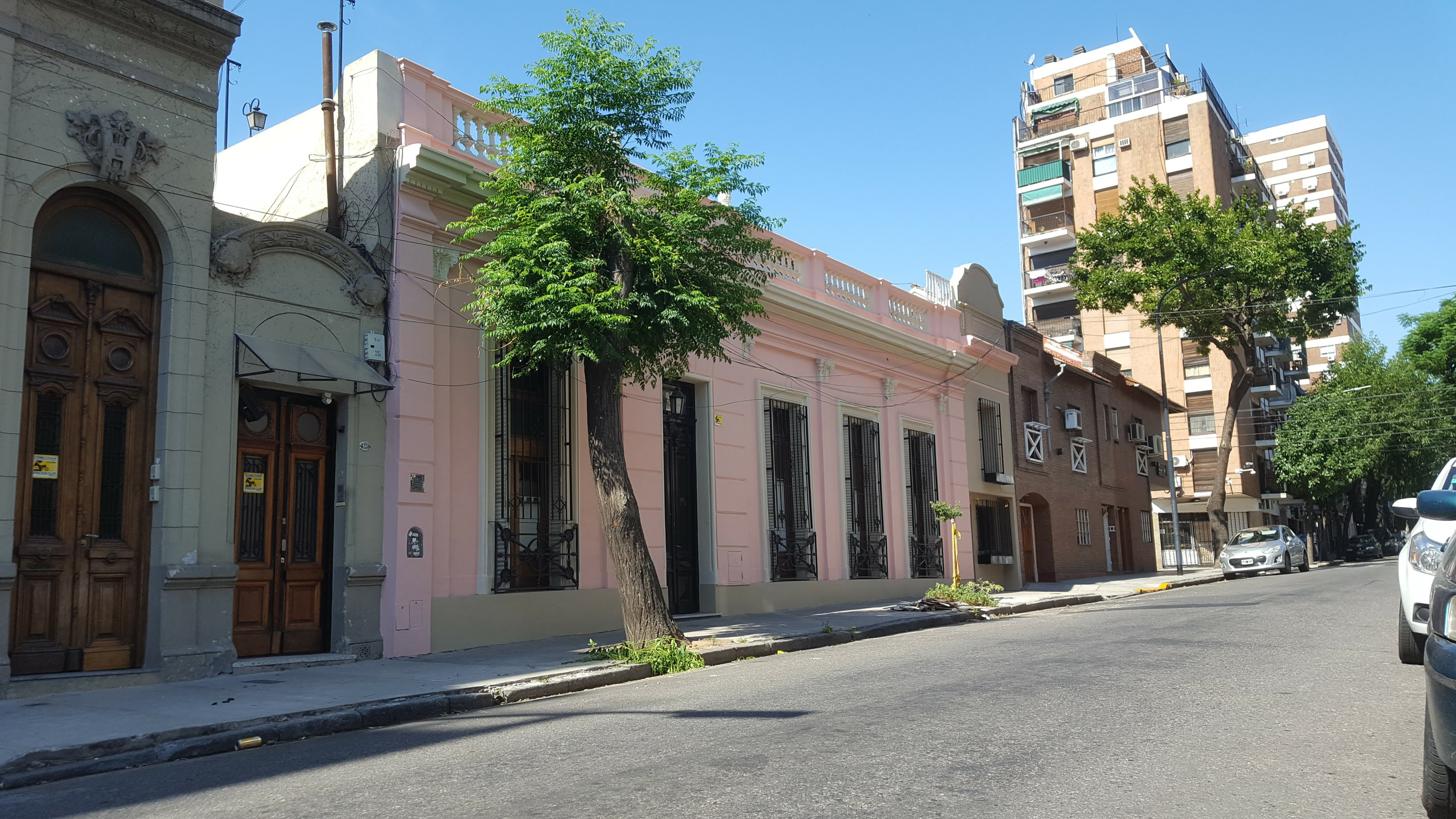
Casa Chorizo in Almagro, Buenos Aires

Late 1800, yellow fever epidemics moved parts of the upper class from the center to their country houses in Almagro. And from early 1900 the neighbourhood started to house the large immigrant waves from Italy and Basque. Many of the original houses like the casa chorizo are from this time and reflect Almagro's colorful history.

== Miscellaneous ==
Nearby Plaza Almagro park on Sarmiento street features a popular playground and a book fair on Sundays.

Parque Centenario, located a little beyond the western edge of Almagro, features an arts-and-crafts and antiques fair on Sundays, and is occasionally used as a concert venue.

September 28 is Almagro Day, marked by celebrations across the main points of the barrio.
