= José C. Paz Partido =

José C. Paz Partido de José C. Paz
- Department

- location of José C. Paz Partido in Gran Buenos Aires
- Coordinates: 31°33′S 58°45′W
- Country: Argentina
- Established: July 13, 1913
- Founder: José Altube
- Seat: José C. Paz

Government
  - Intendant: Lorena Espina (PJ)

Area
  - Total: 50.11 km^{2} (19.35 sq mi)

Population
  - Total: 263,094
  - Density: 5,250/km^{2} (13,600/sq mi)
- Demonym: paceño
- Postal Code: B1665
- IFAM: BUE062
- Area Code: 012320
- Website: www.josecpaz.mun.gba.gov.ar

José C. Paz Partido is a partido in the Greater Buenos Aires urban area of Buenos Aires Province in Argentina.

The provincial subdivision has a population of 263,094 inhabitants in an area of 50.11 km^{2} (19.3 sq mi), and its capital city is José Clemente Paz, which is 35 km (22 mi) from Buenos Aires.

== Economy ==
The main industries in J.C. Paz Partido are centered on the production of textiles, ceramics and food.

== Cooperation Agreements ==
José C. Paz Partido cooperates with:

- Ciudad del Este, Paraguay
