= Swedish Argentines =

Ethnic group in Argentina

Swedish Argentines Argentinasvenskar suecos argentinos
Argentinasvenskar (Swedish) Sueco-argentinos (Spanish)
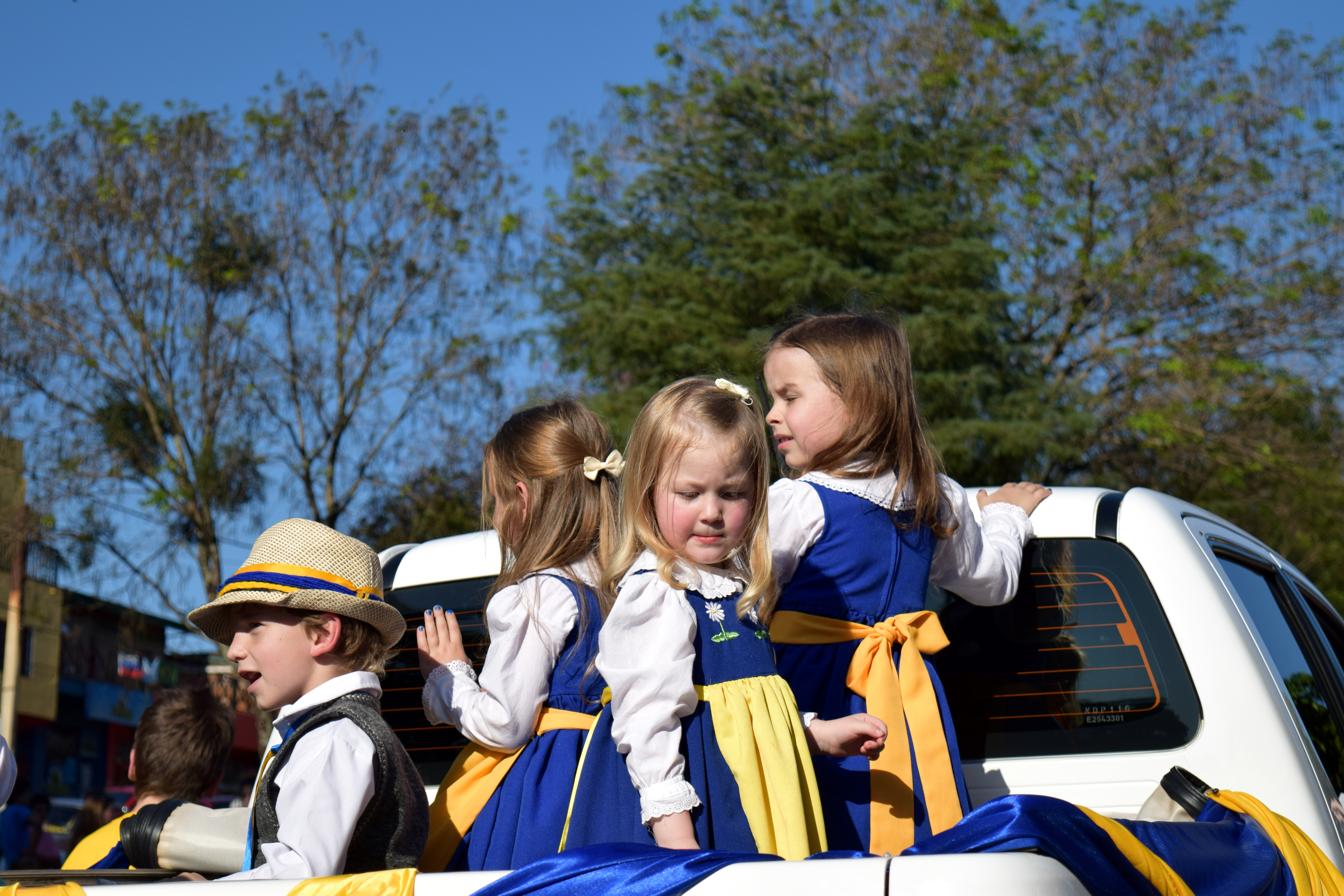
- Swedish Argentine children at the 2014 Immigrant's Festival in Oberá, Misiones

Total population
- Unknown

Regions with significant populations
- Misiones; Buenos Aires

Languages
- Rioplatense Spanish; Swedish

Religion
- Lutheranism

Related ethnic groups
- Swedes; Swedish Americans

Swedish Argentines are Argentine citizens of Swedish descent, as well as Swedish-born people who reside in Argentina. The history of Swedish settlement in Argentina took place principally in the mid to late 19th century, when Swedish people arrived in Argentina. Many Swedes came to Argentina for economic reasons and in order to start a new life. Swedes also helped build Argentina, in particular helping to build Argentina's railroads in the mid 19th century.

The first Swedes to arrive in Argentina were registered as new converts by Jesuits in Córdoba in 1763. Many of the Swedes who showed up during the first half of the 19th century were adventurers who fought in the civil war between the Unitarians and Federalists (on both sides). A good number of them were sons of prominent families who were fleeing a debt or had some other reason to make themselves scarce. They became the black sheep of the Pampas. Back home in northern Sweden, they had hunted moose. In Misiones Province's subtropical rainforest, they hunted tapir.

Argentina is home to the largest Swedish community in Latin America.

== History ==
In 1845 Sweden formally recognized Argentine sovereignty and shortly afterwards the warships Lagerbjelke and Eugenie paid a visit to the new country while also checking out trade routes on the South American continent. They happened to arrive in Buenos Aires just in time for the rebellion against Governor Juan Manuel de Rosas. But the travel accounts written by two naval officers aboard were as much, if not more, about the beautiful porteña women of Buenos Aires, as they were about the dramatic political events taking place.

=== Misiones Swedes ===
Swedes were drawn to the province Misiones at the beginning of the 20th century, at the prospect of growing yerba mate, used to make the herbal tea that is Argentina's national favourite drink. They moved from Brazil, where they had been lured by German-based recruitment offices.

The new arrivals to Brazil soon discovered that the recruitment officers propaganda was nothing more than empty promises. Around 1913 word started going around that across the border, in the Argentine territory of Misiones, the land was more fertile and the government was providing incentives for farmers to grow a profitable cash crop known as the green gold – yerba mate.

Two contingents of emigrants made the voyage south. In 1890–91, most of the 2 000 were workers and families from the crisis-ridden industries in Stockholm and Sundsvall. In 1909–11, most of the 700 were miners from the far north who left after the failure of a nationwide strike. The first Swedes to cross the border to Argentina found not only Brazilian, Paraguayan and German colonists, but also a group of Finnish intellectuals who had fled their country in 1906 for political reasons. After the town of Oberá was officially founded in 1928, the Swedes soon became a minority, but as they had come first there are today neighbourhoods that carry the names of those pioneering farmers – Villa Kindgren, Villa Fredriksson, Villa Erasmie.

In 1914 ten men cleared a 20-kilometre path (picada) through the jungle between the first Swedish settlement, Villa Svea and a German colony. The road is still known as the Picada Sueca. Around 500 Swedes were estimated to have settled in the area by the 1920s and they organized a school, an ethnic-based association and a congregation.

== Swedes in Argentina today ==
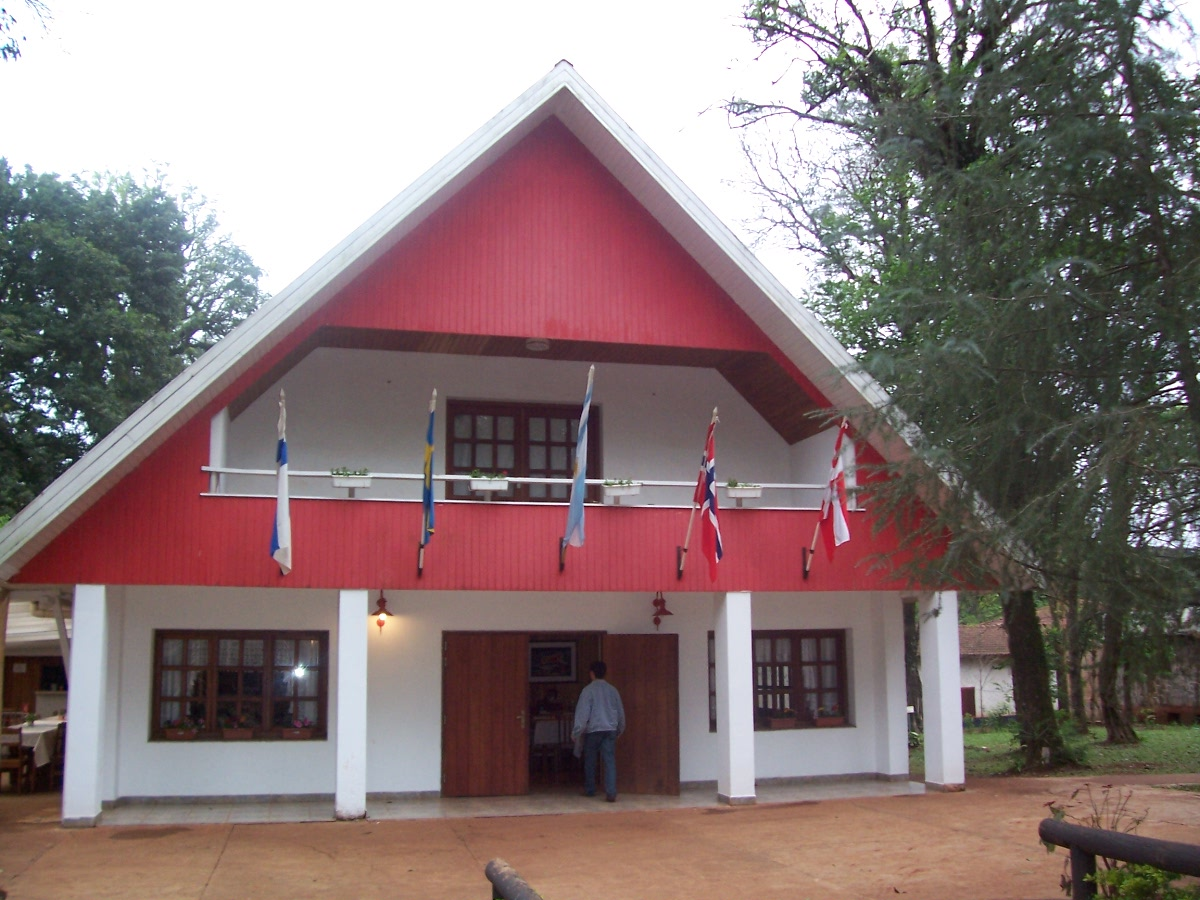
House of the Nordic Argentine Collective of Oberá.

In September many Swedish descendants still participate in the Oberá Immigrants Festival.

=== The Swedish Club ===
The Swedish Club is located in Buenos Aires. It is centrally located in the seven-story Sweden House which also housed the Swedish Embassy between 1996 and 2016, and the Swedish Argentine Chamber of Commerce. In the Asociación Sueca restaurant and bar Swedish lunches are provided. Svenska Föreningen was founded in 1898 by a group of Swedish professionals. The Society had several different homes until the Swedish shipping magnate Axel Axelsson Johnson made a substantial donation for a building in 1920.

== Notable Swedes in Argentina ==
=== Henrik Åberg and Carl August Kihlberg ===
Henrik Åberg (Enrique Aberg) and Carl August Kihlberg (Carlos Kihlberg) were the designers of the Presidential palace of Argentina, the Casa Rosada. They were also appointed as Argentina's first (and only) national architects in 1875; Åberg also drew the blueprints for various hospitals, the Museum of National History in La Plata, and the José de San Martín mausoleum inside Buenos Aires Metropolitan Cathedral on Plaza de Mayo.

=== Scientists ===
Among the first Swedes to step ashore in Argentina were Daniel Solander and Anders Sparrman. They were disciples of botanist Carl von Linné and accompanied Captain Cook on his world expeditions to pick exotic flowers and record anomalies. Several other Nordic scientists were drawn to this area at the beginning of the century. Most remembered among them all is the geologist and polar explorer Otto Nordenskjöld who, along with his crew, survived two winters in Antarctica after a shipwreck. The Argentine government pulled off a successful rescue expedition in 1903. Thousands of people in Buenos Aires celebrated the return of the marine officials and the Swedish scientists. Today the vessel used in the rescue, the corvette Uruguay, is a floating museum in Dock 1 of Puerto Madero.

=== Evert Taube ===
For many people in Sweden, Argentina is both a familiar and a mythological place brought to life by the lyrics of the popular singer-songwriter Evert Taube who lived in the South American country for five years between 1910 and 1915. Contrary to widespread perceptions, Taube did not work as a gaucho (cowboy) on the Pampas but as a foreman supervising workers who were digging canals designed to prevent flooding on the vast plains.

=== David Emanuel Wahlberg ===
David Emanuel Wahlberg was a Swedish sports writer and editor who covered the 1912 Summer Olympics and became president of the sports organization LAIF from 1937 to 1939. In 1923 he became a pastor in Buenos Aires, Argentina. On 15 September 1927, his wife Jenny Katarina Wågberg died and on 28 February 1929, he left Argentina with his four children and returned to Sweden where he married his housekeeper, Bertha Debora Engström. He worked for a few different congregations until 1936 when he moved to Långsele.

=== Swedes born in Argentina and Argentine people of Swedish descent ===
- Dagmar Hagelin, disappeared student
- Carla Peterson, actress
- Leopoldo Torre Nilsson, film director
- Jennifer Dahlgren, hammer thrower

== See also ==
- Argentine-Swedish relations
- Argentines of European descent
- Danish Argentines
- Finnish Argentines
