= Argentina–Sweden relations =

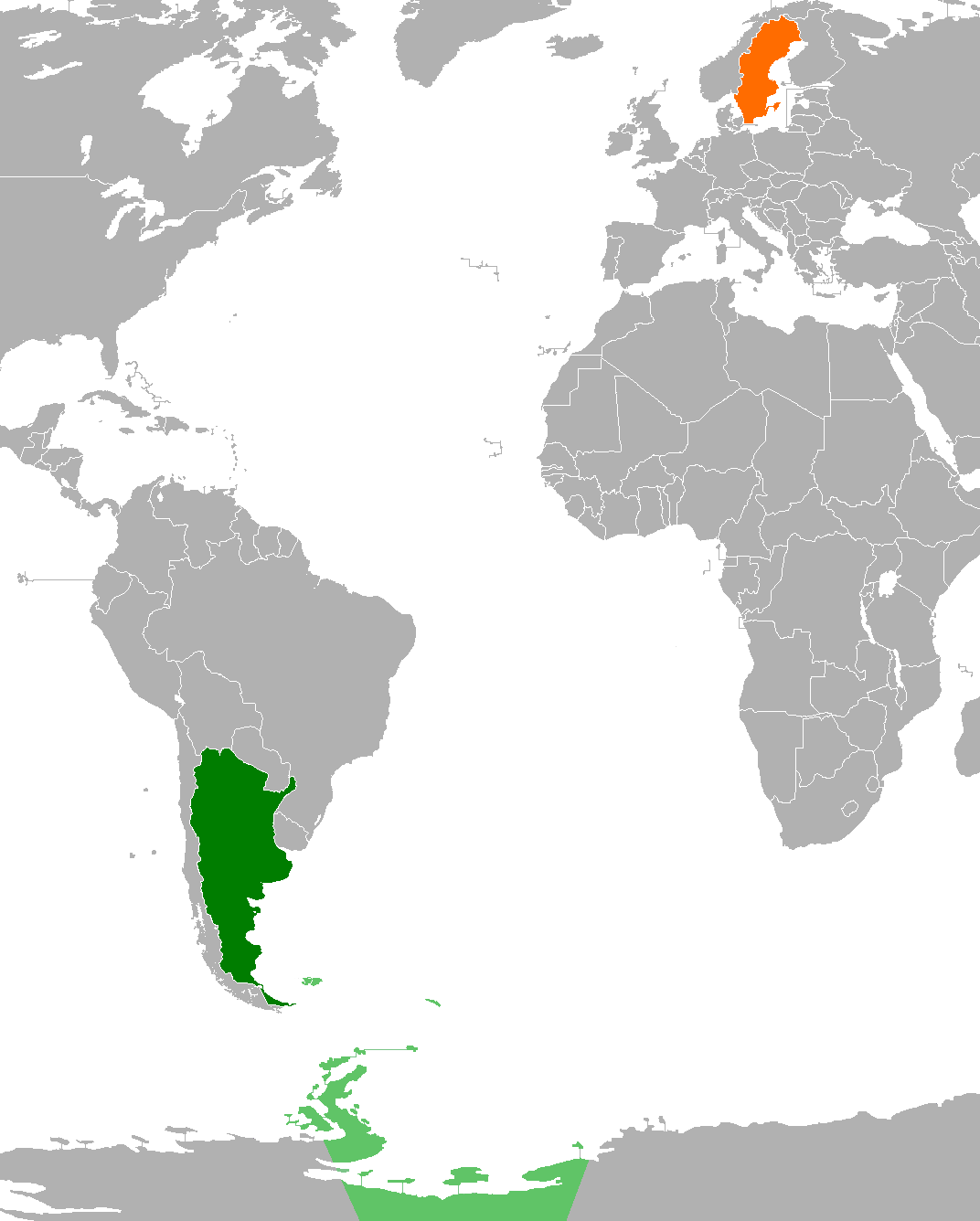
- Argentina: Sweden

Argentina–Sweden relations are bilateral relations between the Argentine Republic and the Kingdom of Sweden. Both countries established diplomatic relations on 3 January 1846. Argentina has an embassy in Stockholm. Sweden has an embassy in Buenos Aires and 3 honorary consulates (in Córdoba, Oberá, and Tucumán); the ambassador is also concurrent to Uruguay and Paraguay.

There are around 175,000 people of Swedish descent living in Argentina.

In 1977, Swedish-Argentine girl Dagmar Hagelin disappeared in Argentina during the Dirty War.

== See also ==
- Argentina–European Union relations
- Foreign relations of Argentina
- Foreign relations of Sweden
- Swedish Argentines
