= Embassy of Sweden, Buenos Aires =

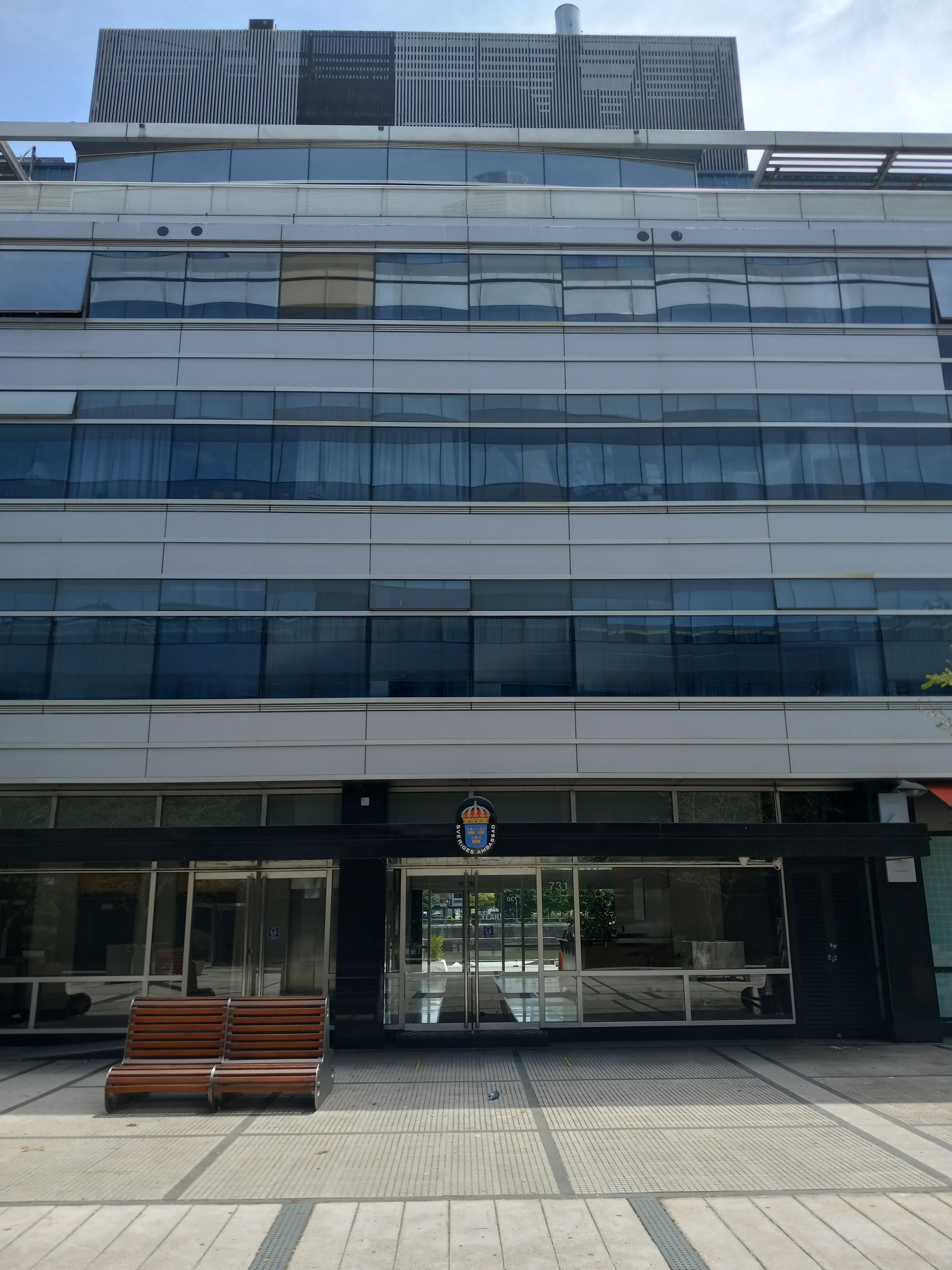
- Location: Buenos Aires
- Address: Visiting address: Olga Cossettini 731, 2nd floor Buenos Aires; Postal address: Embajada de Suecia; Olga Cossettini 731, 2do. piso C1107CDA, Ciudad Autónoma de Buenos Aires; Argentina
- Coordinates: 34.60581°S 58.36419°W
- Opened: 1906
- Ambassador: Torsten Ericsson
- Jurisdiction: Argentina; Paraguay; Uruguay
- Website: Official website

The Embassy of Sweden in Buenos Aires is Sweden's diplomatic mission in Argentina. The embassy is located in Puerto Madero. As of 2024, its staff consists of three people from the Ministry for Foreign Affairs and six local employees. In addition to Argentina, the embassy's area of activity also includes Paraguay and Uruguay. The embassy's activities include the promotion of trade and culture, pro Sweden advocacy, migration and consular affairs, as well as reporting on politics, human rights and the economy.

== History ==
Swedes have been present in Argentina since the beginning of the 19th century; at the Argentine Declaration of Independence in Tucumán on 9 July 1816, Johan Adam Graaner, a Swede, was the only foreigner present. Contact between the two countries was established as early as 1834, when a Swedish consulate opened in Buenos Aires. The Swedish Embassy in Buenos Aires was opened in 1906.

The embassy moved several times before establishing a place of permanent residency; Until 1914, the embassy was situated in Calle General Guido 1640. In 1915, the embassy moved to Calle Vicente Lopez 1649 and in 1916 to Calle Rio Bamba 1145, where it remained until 1926. In 1927, the embassy had moved to the address Calle Libertad 1630, where it remained until 1934. During 1935–1936, the embassy was situated in Calle Posados 1209, and during 1937–1940, at Avenida Alvear 2710. During 1941–1942, the embassy was situated in Sargento Cabral 827 before getting a permanent residency in 1943 at Avenida Corrientes 330.

In January 1957, an agreement was reached between the Swedish and Argentine governments on the mutual elevation of the respective countries' legations to embassies. Subsequently, Herbert Ribbing, Swedens' envoy to Buenos Aires was appointed ambassador. In 1996, a new embassy housed in the Casa de Suecia on Tacuarí 147 was inaugurated. On 22 December 2010, it was announced that the Swedish government decided to close the embassy in 2011 due to financial constraints. However, on 22 September 2011, the closure of the embassy was suspended. In 2016, the embassy moved to its current location at Olga Cossettini 731 in Puerto Madero.

== Staff and tasks ==
=== Staff ===
As of July 2024, nine people work at the Swedish Embassy in Buenos Aires, three of whom are dispatched from the Ministry for Foreign Affairs. The Swedish Armed Forces also have a defence attaché stationed in Brasília who is accredited in Argentina.

=== Tasks ===
The embassy's mission is to represent Sweden and promote Swedish interests. This is achieved through close and ongoing dialogue with representatives of the Argentine government, authorities, and other sectors of society, including the National Congress, businesses, cultural circles, and civil society. The embassy also collaborates closely with other Swedish organizations, such as the Swedish-Argentine Chamber of Commerce and Business Sweden's office in Santiago de Chile.

The embassy also has a consular department that assists Swedish citizens with routine matters and emergencies. Foreign nationals applying for residence permits in Sweden can also receive migration services at the embassy. The embassy is also accredited to Uruguay and Paraguay, thus representing Sweden in these countries as well. In the capitals, Montevideo and Asunción, Swedish honorary consulates general support the embassy's mission.

== Buildings ==
=== Chancery ===
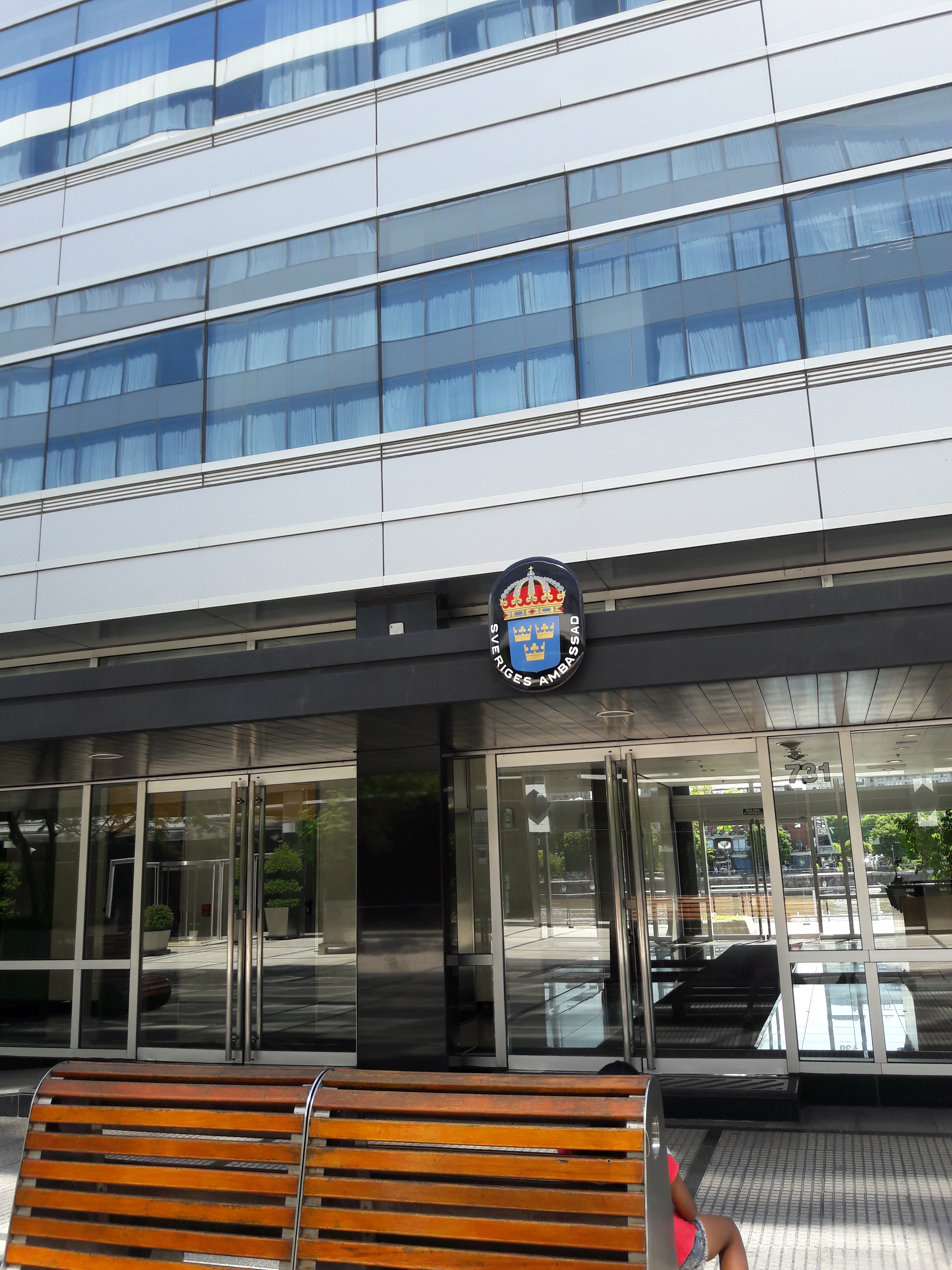
The embassy in Puerto Madero.

Between the chancery opening in 1906 and 1943, it moved around to several locations around Buenos Aires before getting a fixed point on Avenida Corrientes 330 where it stayed for over 50 years. In 1994, the then ambassador Håkan Granqvist, proposed to the Ministry for Foreign Affairs a change of chancellery premises, or a total refurbishment of existing leased premises. Ambassador Granqvist did not like the offices of the Swedish representation on Avenida Corrientes. It was time to renew the embassy. But it wasn't just that. The noise and pollution of the Buenos Aires artery was a constant problem. Avenida Corrientes crosses the 140 meter wide Avenida 9 de Julio at the Obelisco de Buenos Aires and is one of the busiest streets in Buenos Aires. The floor where the embassy worked had limitations that conditioned architectural creativity: a long corridor, with one office behind another, resembling train cars. Between 1992 and 1993 different solutions were analyzed. One was to move the embassy to the Swedish Seamen's Church, another to the modern building complex of Puerto Madero, and a third was to Casa de Suecia (built in 1951). Architects Henrik Östman and Javier Hernán Rojo had to evaluate and calculate the costs involved in renovating the old embassy, or rebuilding the Swedish Association's party rooms, as well as the bar, often empty, on the sixth and seventh floors of the building on Tacuarí 137. It was concluded that the cost of both renovations was similar, but there was an important difference between the two alternatives: Östman and Rojo showed that the two upper floors of the Casa de Suecia allowed a greater range of architectural possibilities. At first, the authorities in Sweden hesitated to choose the Tacuarí Street building as the headquarters of the embassy. But Bengt Krantz of the National Property Board of Sweden approved the project. By then both Ylva Gabrielsson, a diplomat at the embassy, and Lennart Berglund, the president of the Swedish Association, had become enthusiastic collaborators, and were already convinced of the idea. The authorities in Stockholm gave Henrik Östman and Gustavo Helman (of the construction company Helman Estudio) the go-ahead to start work.

The National Property Board of Sweden bought the floors in August 1995 and construction started in February 1996. Both the tenant, that is, the Swedish Ministry of Foreign Affairs, and the owner, the National Property Board of Sweden, communicated permanently with the architects thanks to the fax. The embassy staff moved in at the end of September 1996. In November 1996 the new embassy was inaugurated, very “Swedish”, spacious, welcoming and provided with Scandinavian beech furniture. Clever planning and tasteful decoration was commented on in the Swedish design magazine Form. Argentine architects, for their part, were fascinated by the practical and unassuming stance of the Swedes; such is the case of the ambassador, willing to use, without inconvenience, the same facilities that were offered to his employees. The National Property Board of Sweden's share, ie the embassy, accounted for 21.5% of the building's total area. The floor plan was open and bright and as a popular addition there was a terrace in the southwest outside the break room. All floors were covered with oak parquet from Sweden. The embassy got a better and more representative office. A motto in the project was to do a lot locally and to hire local consultants and contractors where possible. The house was otherwise managed by the Swedish Association and various companies with Swedish connections.

In the autumn of 2016, the embassy was moved to the newly developed financial area Puerto Madero.

=== Residence ===
The ambassadorial residence was built in 1937 by the architect Alejandro Enquin and is located at the address Alejandro María de Aguado 2861 in the Palermo district where several ambassadorial residences are located. The building was purchased by the Swedish state in 1950. The previous owner was SKF in Argentina. The house, which comprises four floors, has a façade with sanded artificial stone plaster. The walled plot is 300 square meters. Extensive renovation work was done in 1988, the private floor on the fourth floor was enlarged and the kitchen and bathroom were modernized. The roof terrace overlooks the Río de la Plata river. A total renovation of electrical installations and replacement of the boiler for gas was carried out in 2003. In 2014, the National Property Board of Sweden began a major renovation of the residence. In 2016, the residence was sold to the Argentine Chamber of Commerce for the purchase price of 45 million Swedish kronor.

== See also ==
- Argentina–Sweden relations
