= Argentines of European descent =

European Argentines
Argentinos Europeos (Spanish)
- (Argentina) (European Union)
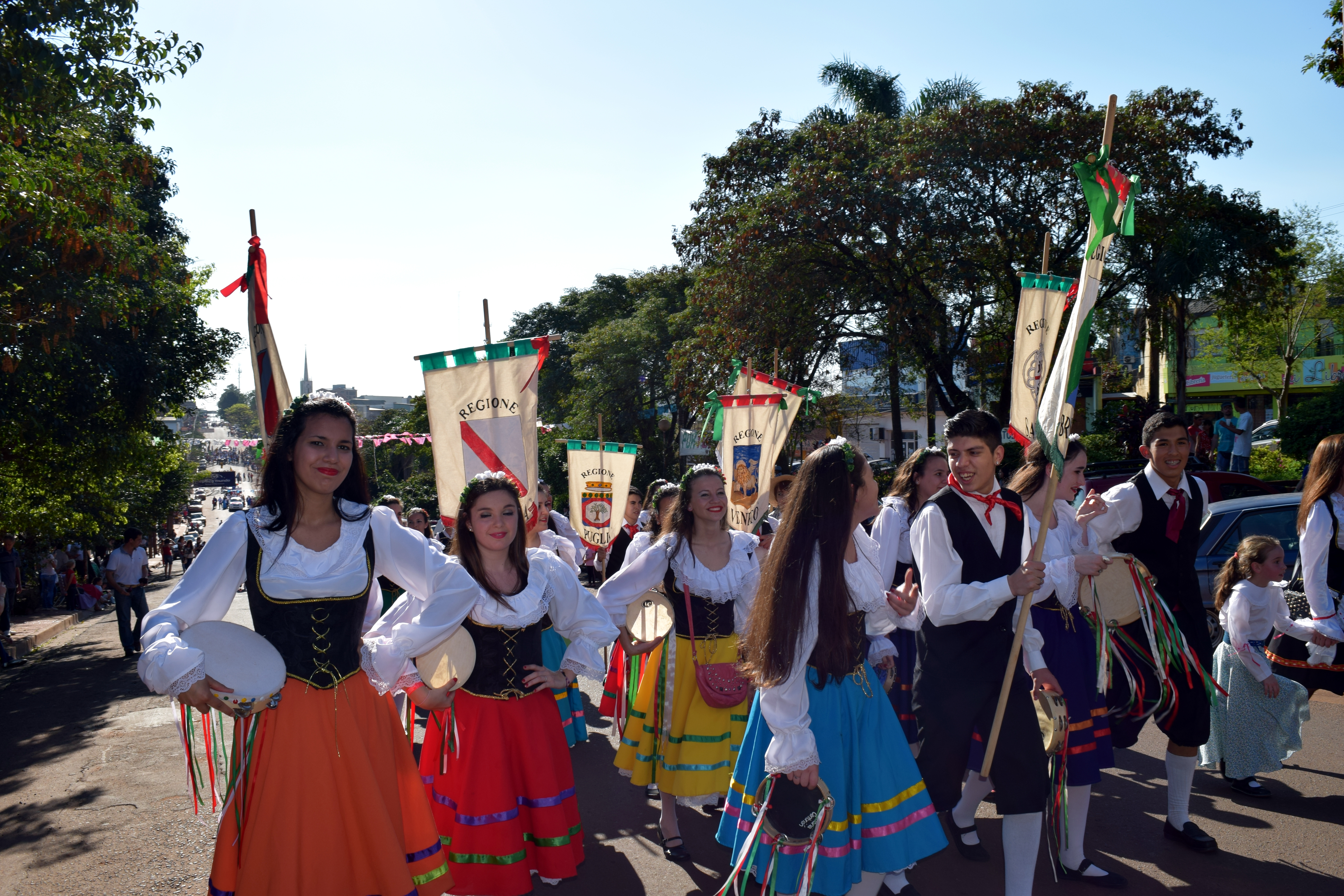
- European Argentines in the inaugural parade of the Immigrant's Festival

Total population
- 44,442,347 (2022 estimate); 96.52% of the Argentine population Full or partial, including Mestizos, Highly inaccurate and speculative estimate

Regions with significant populations
- All areas of Argentina

Languages
- Spanish • European languages (including Italian · Basque · German · Russian · English · Polish · Welsh · Portuguese · Galician · French · Yiddish · Slovene · Ukrainian · Romani · Serbo-Croatian · Romanian)

Religion
- Predominantly Christianity (Roman Catholic, Protestant and Orthodox); Minority Jewish • Buddhism

Related ethnic groups
- European Americans · Spaniards · Italians · Germans · French · Irish · Portuguese · Poles · Romani · Croats · Ashkenazi · Others

European Argentines (Spanish: Argentinos Europeos), are Argentines who have predominantly or total European ancestry (formerly called Criollos or Castizos in the viceregal era), belong to several communities which trace their origins to various migrations from Europe and which have contributed to the country's cultural and demographic variety. They are the descendants of colonists from Spain during the colonial period prior to 1810, or in the majority of cases, of Spanish, Italians, French, Russians and other Europeans who arrived in the great immigration wave from the mid 19th to the mid 20th centuries, and who largely intermarried among their many nationalities during and after this wave. No recent Argentine census has included comprehensive questions on ethnicity, although numerous studies have determined that European Argentines have been a majority in the country since 1914. The majority of Argentines of European descent are descendants of Italians, Spanish, French, Germans, Polish, Russians, British, Irish, among other groups.

== Distribution ==
European Argentinians may live in any part of the country, though their proportion varies according to region. Due to the fact that the main entry point for European immigrants was the Port of Buenos Aires, they settled mainly in the central-eastern region known as the Pampas (the provinces of Buenos Aires, Santa Fe, Córdoba, Entre Ríos and La Pampa), Their presence in the north-western region (mainly in the provinces of Jujuy and Salta) is less evident due to several reasons: it was the most densely populated region of the country (mainly by Amerindian and Mestizo people) until the immigratory wave of 1857 to 1940, and it was the area where the European newcomers settled the least. During the last decades, due to internal migration from these north-western provinces and due to immigration especially from Bolivia, Peru and Paraguay (which have Amerindian and Mestizo majorities), the percentage of European Argentines in certain areas of the Greater Buenos Aires has significantly decreased as well.

== Estimates ==
Neither official census data nor statistically significant studies exist on the precise amount or percentage of Argentines of European descent today. The Argentine government recognizes the different communities, but Argentina's National Institute of Statistics and Censuses (INDEC) does not conduct ethnic/racial censuses, nor includes questions about ethnicity. The Census conducted on 27 October 2010, did include questions on Indigenous peoples (complementing the survey performed in 2005) and on Afro-descendants.

== Genetic research ==
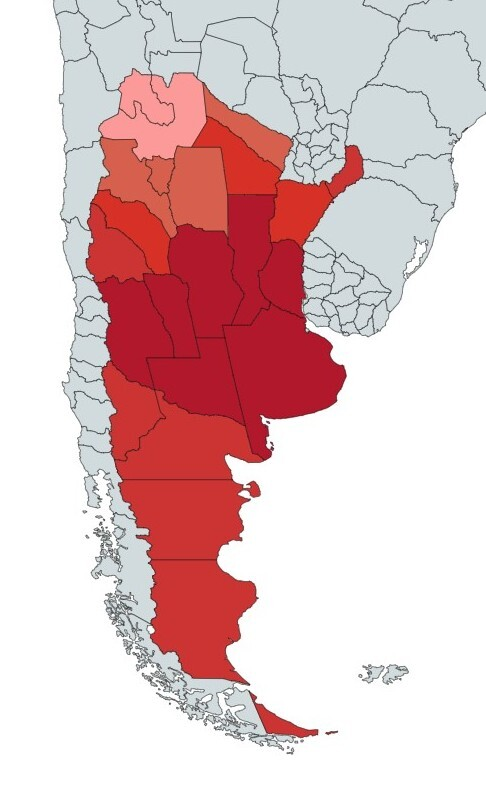
Ethnic map of Argentina. In darker tones the areas with predominant European ancestry.

It is estimated that more than 30 million Argentines (about 65%) have at least one Italian forefather. Another study of the Amerindian ancestry of Argentines was headed by Argentine geneticist Daniel Corach of the University of Buenos Aires. The results of this study in which DNA from 320 individuals in 9 Argentine provinces was examined showed that 56% of these individuals had at least one Amerindian ancestor. Other studies suggest that figure could be 30%. A study on African ancestry was also conducted by the University of Buenos Aires in the city of La Plata. In this study 4.3% of the 500 study participants were shown to have some degree of African ancestry. Nevertheless, it must be said here that this type of genetic studies -meant only to search for specific lineages in the mtDNA or in the Y-Chromosome, which do not recombine- may be misleading. For example, a person with seven European great-grandparents and only one Amerindian/Mestizo great-grandparent will be included in that 30% or 56%, although his/her phenotype will most probably be Caucasian.

A separate genetic study on genic admixture was conducted by Argentine and French scientists from multiple academic and scientific institutions (CONICET, UBA, Centre d'anthropologie de Toulouse). This study showed that the average contribution to Argentine ancestry was 79.9% European, 15.8% Amerindian and 4.3% African. Another similar study was conducted in 2006, and its results were also similar. A team led by Michael F. Seldin from the University of California, with members of scientific institutes from Argentina, the United States, Sweden and Guatemala, analyzed samples from 94 individuals and concluded that the average genetic structure of the Argentine population contains a 78.1% European contribution, 19.4% Amerindian contribution and 2.5% African contribution (using the Bayesian algorithm).

A team led by Daniel Corach conducted a new study in 2009, analyzing 246 samples from eight provinces and three different regions of the country. The results were as follows: the analysis of Y-Chromosome DNA revealed a 94.1% of European contribution (a little higher than the 90% of the 2005 study), and only 4.9% and 0.9% of Native American and Black African contribution, respectively. Mitochondrial DNA analysis again showed a great Amerindian contribution by maternal lineage, at 53.7%, with 44.3% of European contribution, and a 2% African contribution. The study of 24 autosomal markers also proved a large European contribution of 78.5%, against 17.3% of Amerindian and 4.2% Black African contributions. The samples were compared with three assumed parental populations, and the MDS analysis plot resulting showed that "most of the Argentinean samples clustered with or closest to Europeans, some appeared between Europeans and Native Americans indicating some degree of genetic admixture between these two groups, three samples clustered close to Native Americans, and no Argentinean sampled appeared close to Africans".

- According to Caputo et al., 2021, the study of autosomal DIPs show that the genetic contribution is 77.8% European, 17.9% Amerindian and 4.2% African. The X-DIPs matrilineal show 52.9% European, 39.6% Amerindian, and 7.5% African.
- Olivas et al., 2017, Nature: 84,1% European and 12,8% Amerindian.
- Homburguer et al., 2015, PLOS One Genetics: 67% European, 28% Amerindian, 4% African and 1.4% Asian.
- Genera (2022): 85% Caucasian (74% European + 11% Middle East), 13% Amerindian and 1% African.
- According to Seldin et al., 2006, American Journal of Physical Anthropology, the genetic structure of Argentina would be: 78.0% European, 19.4% Amerindian and 2.5% African. Using other methods it was found that it could be: 80.2% European, 18.1% Amerindian and 1.7% African.
- In the work of Corach et al. the authors say that "Argentineans carried a large fraction of European genetic heritage in their Y-chromosomal (94.1%) and autosomal (78.5%) DNA, but their mitochondrial gene pool is mostly of Native American ancestry (53.7%); instead, African heritage was small in all three genetic systems (<4%)".
- Avena et al., 2012, PLOS One Genetics: 65% European, 31% Amerindian, and 4% African.
  - Buenos Aires Province: 76% European and 24% others.
  - South Zone (Chubut Province): 54% European and 46% others.
  - Northeast Zone (Misiones, Corrientes, Chaco & Formosa provinces): 54% European and 46% others.
  - Northwest Zone (Salta Province): 33% European and 67% others.
- Other studies indicate that the genetic composition between regions would be:
  - Central Zone: 81% European, 15% Amerindian and 4% African
  - South Zone: 68% European, 28% Amerindian and 4% African
  - Northeast Zone: 79% European, 17% Amerindian and 4% African
  - Northwest Zone: 55% European, 35% Amerindian and 10% African
- According to the study by María Laura Catelli et al., 2011. The Native American component observed in the urban populations was 66%, 41%, and 70% in South, Central, and North Argentina, respectively
- Neide Maria de Oliveira Godinho, 2008, at the University of Brasília: 60% European, 31% Amerindian and 9% African.
- National Geographic: 61% Caucasian (52% European + 9% Middle East/North Africa), 27% Amerindian ancestry and 9% African.
- According to Norma Pérez Martín, 2007, at least 56% of Argentines would have indigenous ancestry.

== History ==
=== Colonial and post-independence period ===
The presence of European people in the Argentine territory began in 1516, when Spanish Conquistador Juan Díaz de Solís explored the Río de la Plata. In 1527, Sebastian Cabot founded the fort of Sancti Spiritus, near Coronda, Santa Fe; this was the first Spanish settlement on Argentine soil. The process of Spanish occupation continued with expeditions coming from Upper Peru (present-day Bolivia), that founded Santiago del Estero in 1553, San Miguel de Tucumán in 1565 and Córdoba in 1573, and from Chile, which founded Mendoza in 1561 and San Juan in 1562. Other Spanish expeditions founded the cities of Santa Fe (1573), Buenos Aires (1580), and Corrientes (1588).

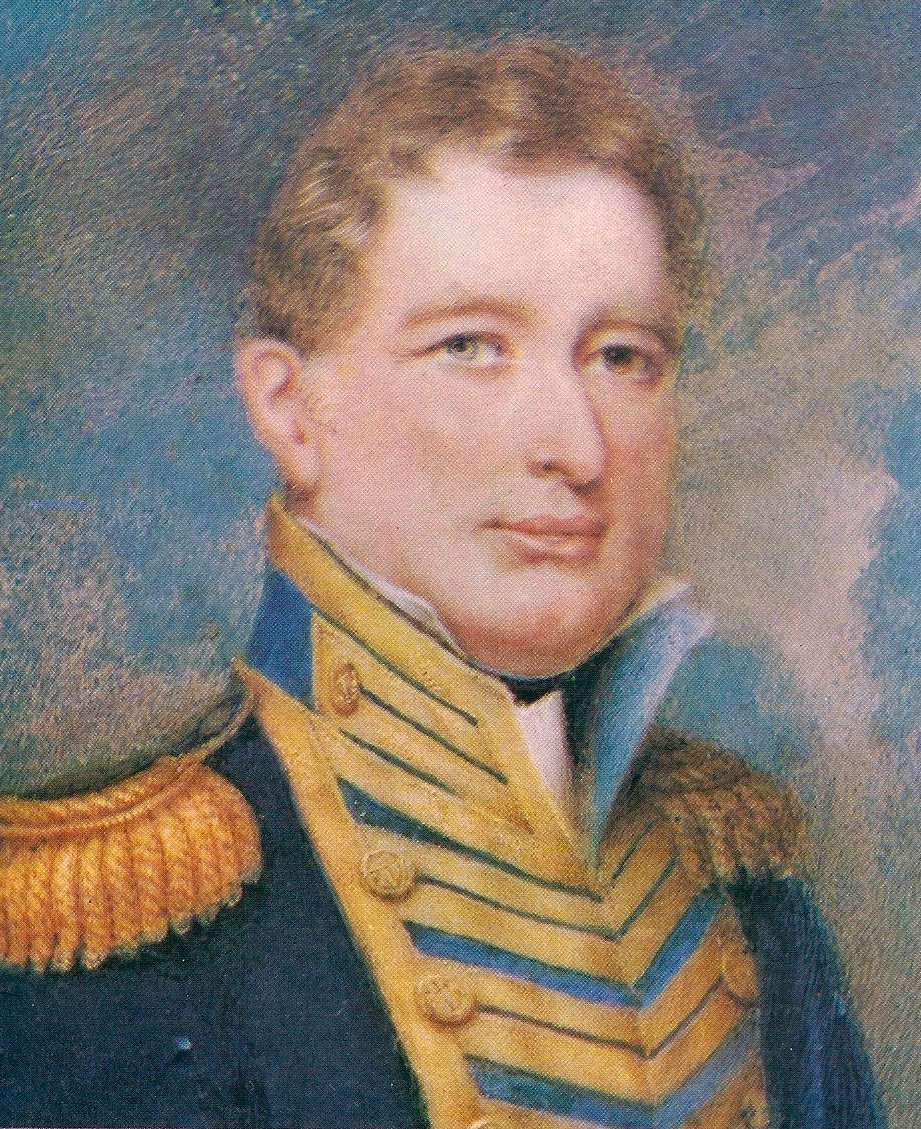
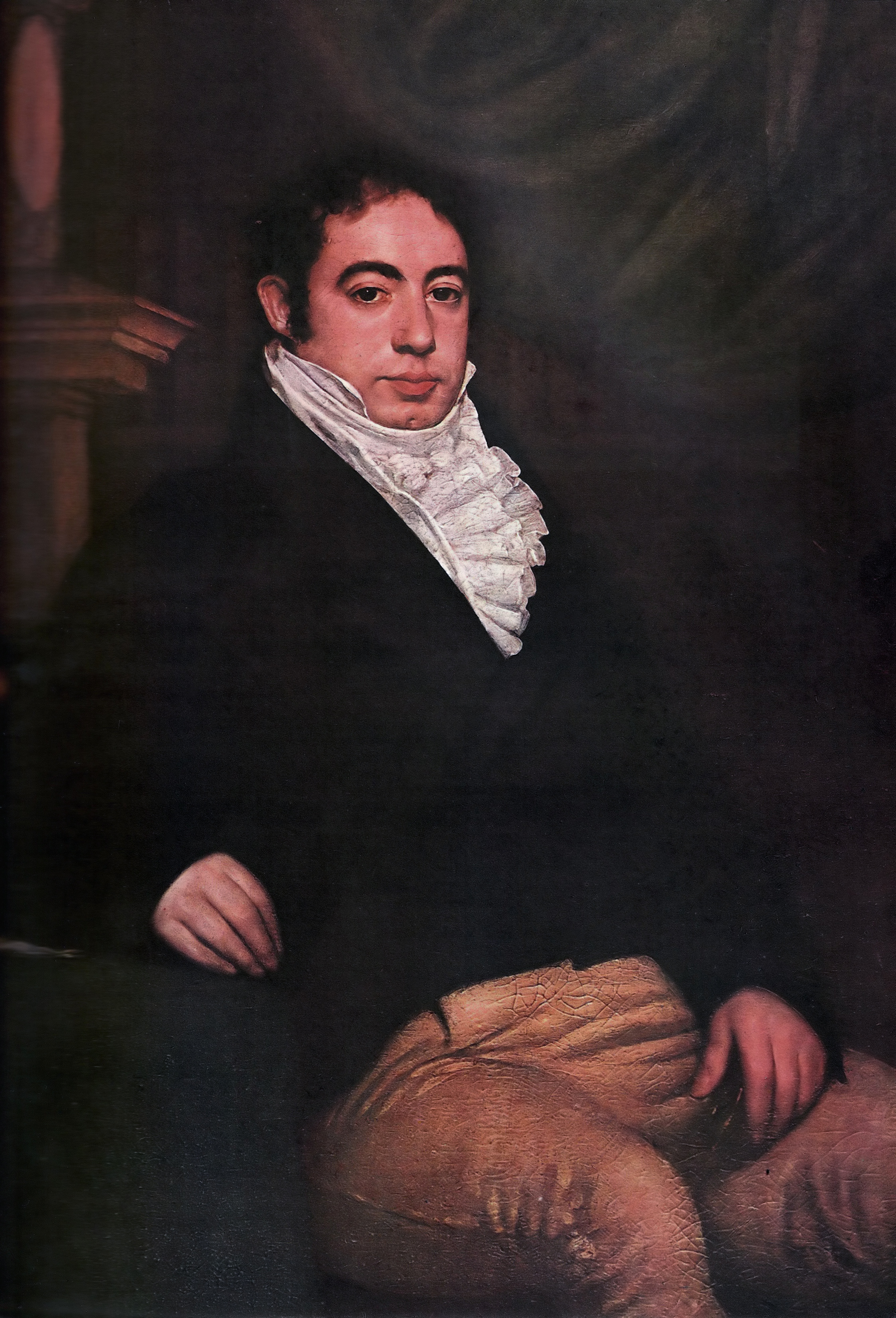
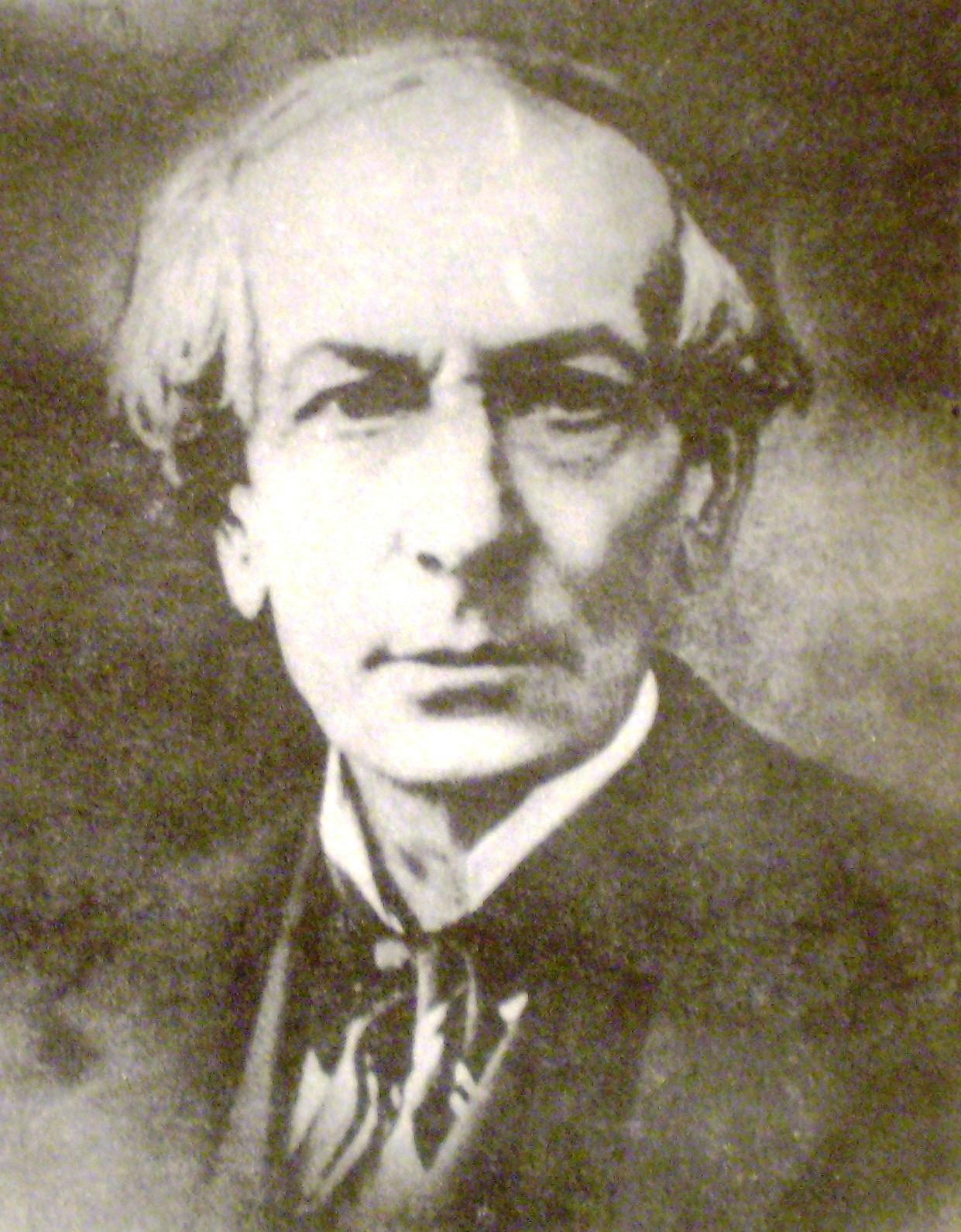
* Admiral Guillermo Brown, who emigrated from Ireland in 1809 and is considered the father of the Argentine Navy.
* President Bernardino Rivadavia established the Immigration Commission.
* Jurist Juan Bautista Alberdi included the encouragement of European immigration in his draft for the Argentine Constitution.

It was not until the creation of the Viceroyalty of Río de la Plata in 1776, that the first censuses with classification into castas were conducted. The 1778 Census ordered by viceroy Juan José de Vértiz in Buenos Aires revealed that, of a total population of 37,130 inhabitants, the Spaniards and Criollos numbered 25,451, or 68.55% of the total. Another census carried out in the Corregimiento de Cuyo in 1777 showed that the Spaniards and Criollos numbered 4,491 (or 51.24%) out of a population of 8,765 inhabitants. In Córdoba (city and countryside) the Spanish/Criollo people comprised 39.36% (about 14,170) of 36,000 inhabitants.

According to data from the Argentine government in 1810, about 6,000 Spanish lived in the territory of the United Provinces of Río de la Plata Spanish, of a total population of around 700,000 inhabitants. This small number indicates that the presence of people with European ancestors was very small, and a large number of Criollos were mixed with indigenous and African mothers, although the fact was often hidden; in this regard, for example, according to researcher José Ignacio García Hamilton the Liberator, José de San Martín, would be mestizo.

Nevertheless, these censuses were generally restricted to the cities and the surrounding rural areas, so little is known about the racial composition of large areas of the Viceroyalty, though it is supposed that Spaniards and Criollos were always a minority, with the other castas comprising the majority. It is worth noting that, since a person who was classified as Peninsular or Criollo had access to more privileges in the colonial society, many Castizos (resulting from the union of a Spanish and a mestizo) purchased their limpieza de sangre ("purity of blood").

Although being a minority in demographics terms, the Criollo people played a leading role in the May Revolution of 1810, as well as in the independence of Argentina from the Spanish Empire in 1816. Argentine national heroes such as Manuel Belgrano and Juan Martín de Pueyrredón, military men as Cornelio Saavedra and Carlos María de Alvear, and politicians as Juan José Paso and Mariano Moreno were mostly Criollos of Spanish, Italian or French descent. The Second Triumvirate and the 1813 assembly enacted laws encouraging immigration, and instituted advertising campaigns and contract work programs among prospective immigrants in Europe.

The Minister of Government of Buenos Aires Province, Bernardino Rivadavia, established the Immigration Commission in 1824. He appointed Ventura Arzac to conduct a new Census in the city, and it showed these results: the city had 55,416 inhabitants, of which 40,000 were of European descent (about 72.2%); of this total of Whites, a 90% were Criollos, a 5% were Spaniards, and the other 5% were from other European nations.

After the wars for independence, a long period of internal struggle followed. During the period between 1826 and 1852, some Europeans settled in the country as well -sometimes hired by the local governments. Notable among them, Savoyan lithographer Charles Pellegrini (President Carlos Pellegrini's father) and his wife Maria Bevans, Neapolitan journalist Pedro de Angelis, and German physician/zoologist Hermann Burmeister. Because of this long conflict, there were neither economic resources nor political stability to carry out any census until the 1850s, when some provincial censuses were organized. These censuses did not continue the classification into castas typical of the pre-independence period.

The administration of Governor Juan Manuel de Rosas, who had been given the sum of public power by other governors in the Argentine Confederation, maintained Rivadavia' Immigration Commission, which continued to advertise agricultural colonies in Argentina among prospective European immigrants. Following Rosas' overthrow by Entre Ríos Province Governor Justo José de Urquiza, jurist and legal scholar Juan Bautista Alberdi was commissioned to prepare a draft for a new Constitution. His outline, Bases and Starting Points for the Political Organization of the Argentine Republic, called the Federal Government to "promote European immigration," and this policy would be included as Article 25 of the Argentine Constitution of 1853.

The first post-independence census conducted in Buenos Aires took place in 1855; it showed that there were 26,149 European inhabitants in the city. Among the nationals there is no distinction of race, but it does distinguish literates from illiterates; at that time formal education was a privilege almost exclusive for the upper sectors of society, who were predominantly of European descent. Including European residents and the 21,253 Argentine literates, around 47,402 people of mainly European descent resided in Buenos Aires in 1855; they would have comprised about 51.6% of a total population of 91,895 inhabitants.

=== Great wave of immigration from Europe (1857–1940) ===
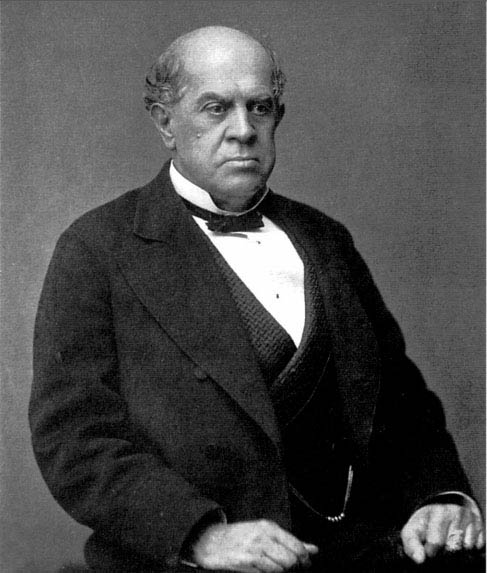
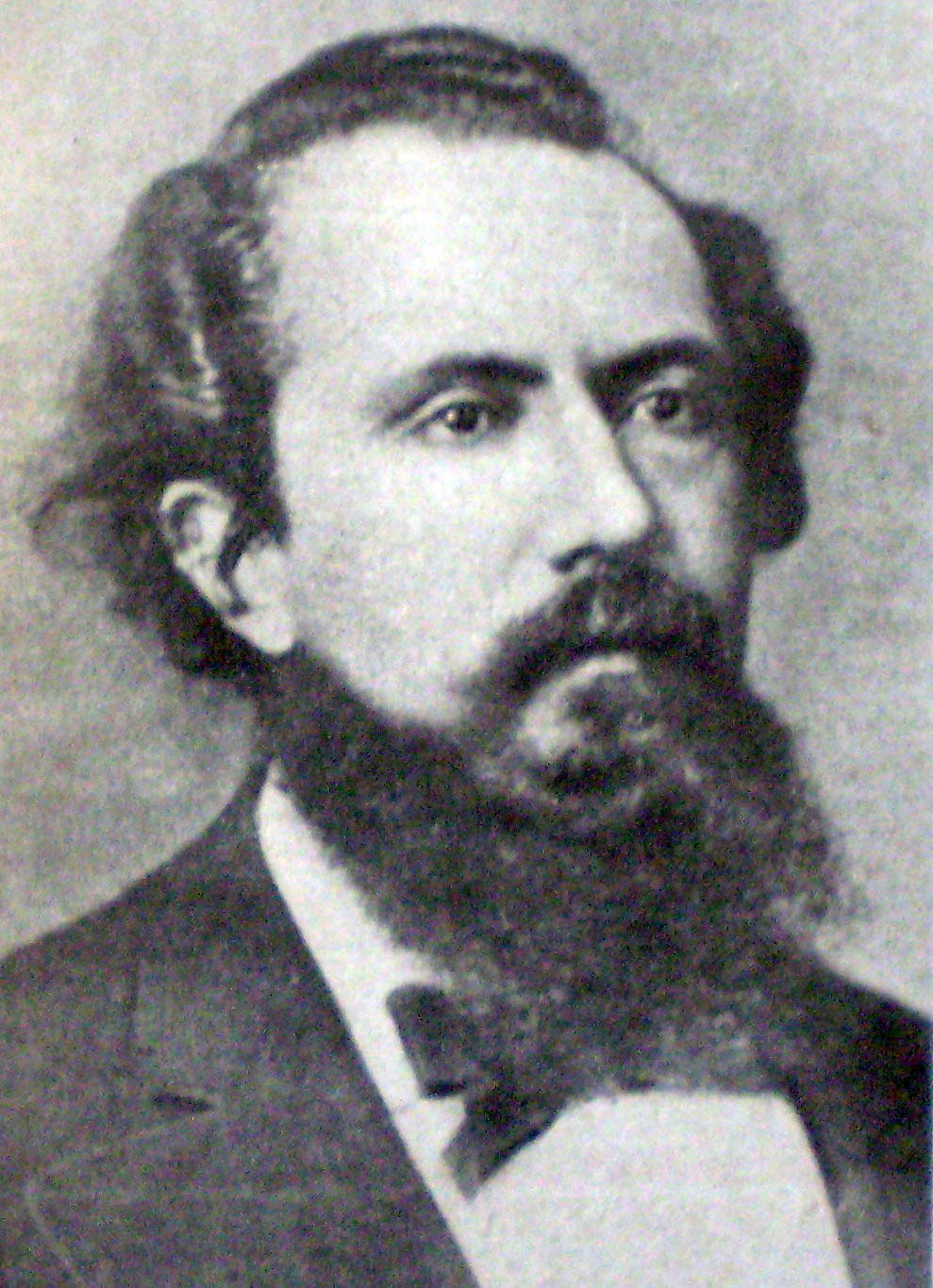
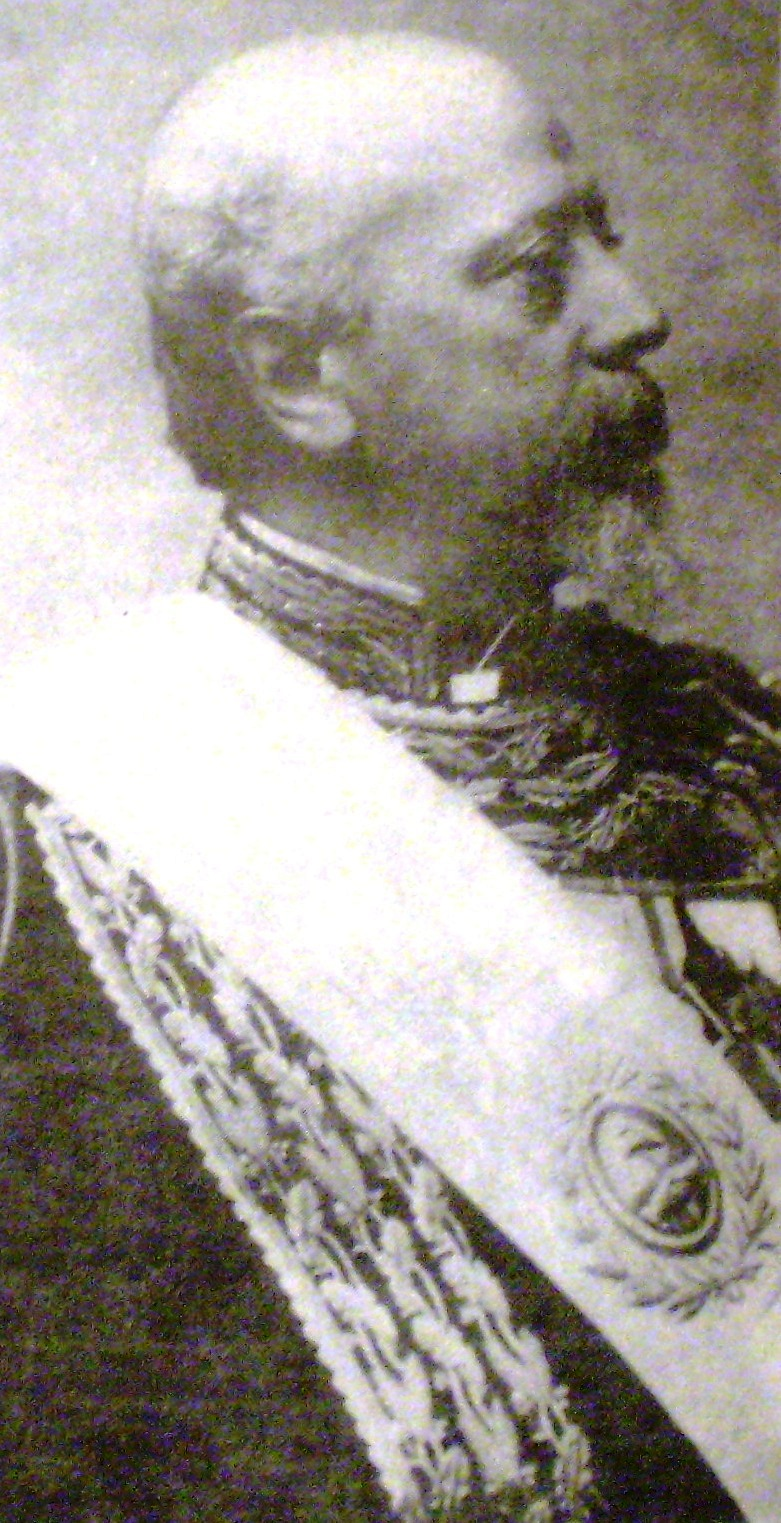
* President Domingo Sarmiento was the leading advocate for European immigration as a means of spurring development.
* President Nicolás Avellaneda enacted Law 817 of Immigration and Colonization.
* President Julio Roca led the Conquest of the Desert in 1879, enabling Argentina to occupy new lands for the immigrants to buy and cultivate. Both Avellaneda and Roca belonged to traditional Criollo families from Tucumán.

Proportion of foreign Europeans in each department as of the 1869 census.

Proportion of foreign Europeans in each department as of the 1895 census.

Proportion of foreign Europeans in each department as of the 1914 census.

Proportion of foreign Europeans in each department as of the 1947 census.

In February 1856, the municipal government of Baradero granted lands for the settlement of ten Swiss families in an agricultural colony near that town. Later that year, another colony was founded by Swiss immigrants in Esperanza, Santa Fe. These provincial initiatives remained isolated cases until differences between the Argentine Confederation and the State of Buenos Aires were resolved with the Battle of Pavón in 1861, and a strong central government could be established. Presidents Bartolomé Mitre (the victor at Pavón), Domingo Sarmiento and Nicolás Avellaneda implemented policies that encouraged massive European immigration. These were formalized with the 1876 Congressional approval of Law 817 of Immigration and Colonization, signed by President Avellaneda. During the following decades, and until the mid-20th century, waves of European settlers came to Argentina. Major contributors included Italy (initially from Piedmont, Veneto and Lombardy, later from Campania, Calabria, and Sicily), and Spain (most were Galicians and Basques, but there were Asturians).

Smaller but significant numbers of immigrants include those from France, Poland, Russia, Germany, Austria, Hungary, Croatia, England, Scotland, Ireland, Switzerland, Belgium, Denmark, and others. Europeans from the former Ottoman Empire were mainly Greek. The majority of Argentina's Jewish community descend from immigrants of Ashkenazi Jewish origin.

This migratory influx had mainly two effects on Argentina's demography

1) The exponential growth of the country's population. In the first National Census of 1869 the Argentine population was just 1,877,490 inhabitants, in 1895 it had doubled to 4,044,911, in 1914 it had reached 7,903,662, and by 1947 it had doubled again to 15,893,811. It is estimated that by 1920, more than 50% of the residents in Buenos Aires had been born abroad. According to Zulma Recchini de Lattes' estimate, if this great immigratory wave from Europe and the Middle East had not happened, Argentina's population by 1960 would have been less than 8 million, while the national census carried out that year revealed a population of 20,013,793 inhabitants. Argentina received a total of 6,611,000 European and Middle-Eastern immigrants during the period 1857–1940; 2,970,000 were Italians (44.9%), 2,080,000 were Spaniards (31.5%), and the remaining 23.6% was composed of French, Poles, Russians, Germans, Austro-Hungarians, British, Portuguese, Swiss, Belgians, Danes, Dutch, Swedes, etc.

2) A radical change in its ethnic composition; the 1914 National Census revealed that around 80% of the national population were either European immigrants, their children or grandchildren. Among the remaining 20% (those descended from the population residing locally before this immigrant wave took shape), around a fifth were of mainly European descent. Put down to numbers, this means that about 84%, or 6,300,000 people (out of a total population of 7,903,662), residing in Argentina were of European descent. European immigration continued to account for over half the nation's population growth during the 1920s, and was again significant (albeit in a smaller wave) following World War II.

The distribution of these European/Middle Eastern immigrants was not uniform across the country. Most newcomers settled in the coastal cities and the farmlands of Buenos Aires, Santa Fe, Córdoba and Entre Ríos. For example, the 1914 National Census showed that, of almost three million people −2,965,805 to be exact- living in the provinces of Buenos Aires and Santa Fe, 1,019,872 were European immigrants, and one and a half million more were children of European mothers; in all, this community comprised at least 84.9% of this region's population. The same dynamic was less evident in the rural areas of the northwestern provinces, however: immigrants (mostly of Syrian-Lebanese origin) represented a mere 2.6% (about 15,600) of a total rural population of 600,000 in Jujuy, Salta, Tucumán, Santiago del Estero and Catamarca.

==== Origin of the immigrants between 1857 and 1920 ====
Net Immigration by Nationality (1857–1920)
Subjecthood or Citizenship	Total numbers of immigrants	Percentage of total
Italy	2,341,126	44.72%
Spain	1,602,752	30.61%
France	221,074	4.22%
Russian Empire ^{(1)}	163,862	3.13%
Ottoman Empire	141,622	2.71%
Austria-Hungary ^{(2)}	87,266	1.67%
German Empire	69,896	1.34%
United Kingdom ^{(3)}	60,477	1.16%
Switzerland	34,525	0.66%
Portugal	30,729	0.59%
Belgium	23,549	0.45%
Denmark	10,644	0.20%
Netherlands	8,111	0.15%
United States	8,067	0.15%
Sweden	2,223	0.04%
Luxembourg^{(4)}	1,000	0.02%
Others	428,471	8.18%
Total	5,235,394	

Notes:

(1) This figure includes Russians, Ukrainians, Volga Germans, Belarusians, Poles, Lithuanians, etc. that entered Argentina with passport of the Russian Empire.
(2) This figure includes all the peoples that lived within the boundaries of the Austro-Hungarian Empire between 1867 and 1918: Austrians, Hungarians, Czechs, Slovaks, Slovenians, Croatians, Bosniaks, Ruthenians and people from the regions of Vojvodina in Serbia, Trentino-Alto Adige/Südtirol and Trieste in Italy, Transylvania in Romania, and Galicia in Poland.
(3) The United Kingdom included Ireland until 1922; that is why most of the British immigrants -nicknamed "ingleses"- were in fact Irish, Welsh and Scottish.
(4) Around 0.5% of Luxembourg's total population emigrated to Argentina during the 1880s.

Source: Dirección Nacional de Migraciones: Infografías., that information was modified – figures there are by nationality, not by country.

==== Origin of the immigrants between 1857 and 1940 ====
Immigration by Nationality (1857–1940)
Subjecthood or Citizenship	Total numbers of immigrants	Percentage of total
Italy	2,970,000	36.7%
Spain	2,080,000	25.7%
France	239,000	2.9%
Poland	180,000	2.2%
Russia	177,000	2.2%
Ottoman Empire	174,000	2.1%
Austro-Hungarian	111,000	1.4%
United Kingdom	75,000	1.0%
Germany	72,000	0.9%
Portugal	65,000	0.8%
Yugoslavia	48,000	0.6%
Switzerland	44,000	0.6%
Belgium	26,000	0.3%
Denmark	18,000	0.2%
United States	12,000	0.2%
Netherlands	10,000	0.2%
Sweden	7,000	0.1%
Others	223,000	2.8%
Total (Note: About 52% of immigrants in the period 1857–1939 were definitively settled.)	6,611,000	100.0%

Source: National Migration, 1970.

=== Second wave of immigration ===
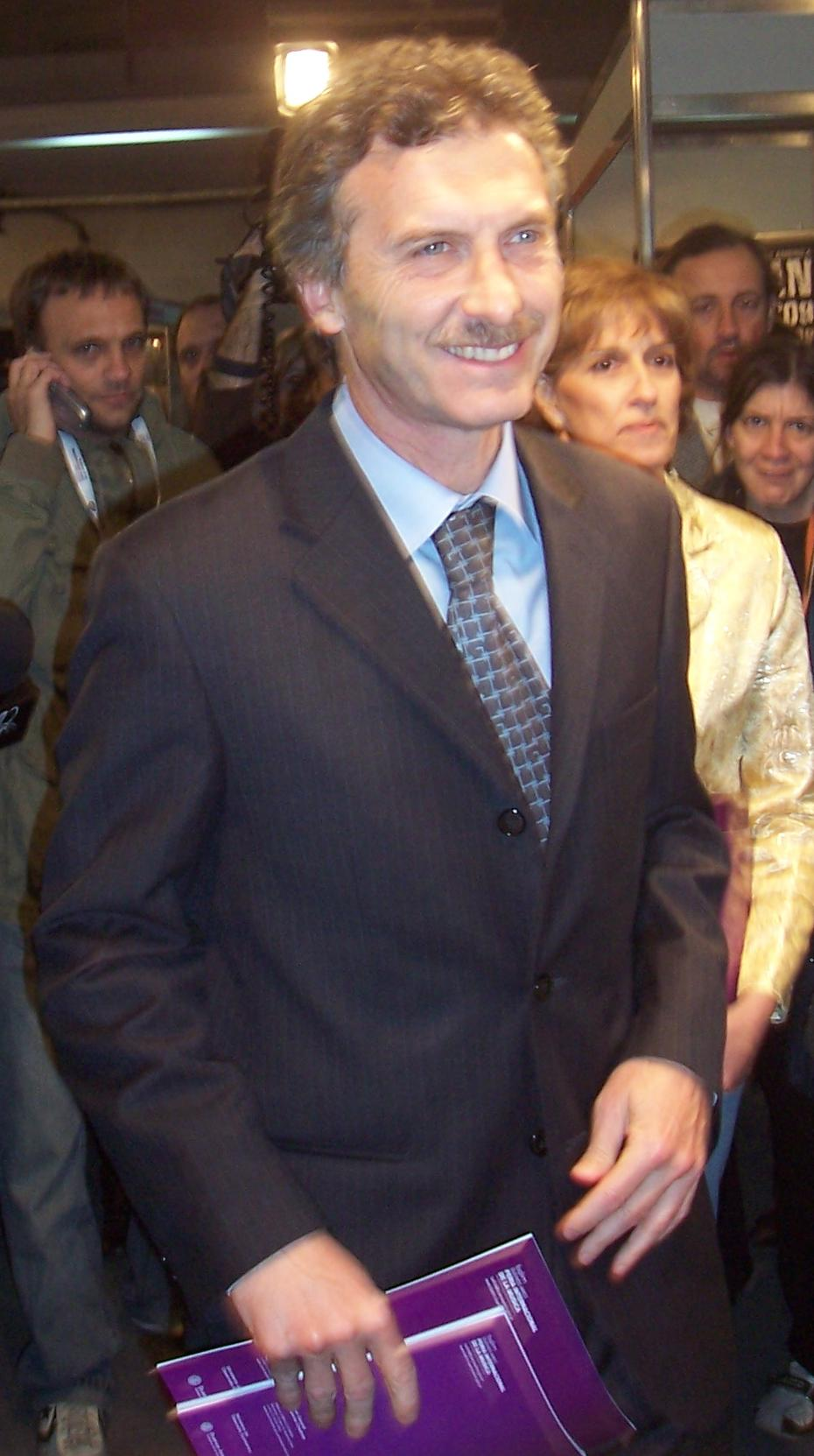
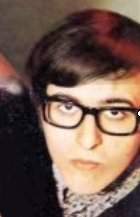
* Mauricio Macri; the former president of Argentina is the son of businessman Francisco Macri, who was born in Rome (Italy) and emigrated as a young man.
* Kay Galiffi, guitarist of rock band Los Gatos. He was born in Italy in 1948; his parents emigrated with him to Rosario, Santa Fe in 1950.

During and after the Second World War, many Europeans fled to Argentina, escaping the hunger and poverty of the post-war period. According to the National Bureau of Migrations, during the period 1941–1950 at least 392,603 Europeans entered the country: 252,045 Italians, 110,899 Spaniards, 16,784 Poles, 7,373 Russians and 5,538 French. Among the notable Italian immigrants in that period were protest singer Piero De Benedictis (emigrated with his parents in 1948), actors Rodolfo Ranni (emigrated in 1947) and Gianni Lunadei (1950), publisher César Civita (1941), businessman Francisco Macri (1949), lawmaker Pablo Verani (1947), and rock musician Kay Galiffi (1950).

Argentina also received thousands of Germans, including the humanitarian businessman Oskar Schindler and his wife, hundreds of Ashkenazi Jews, and hundreds of Nazi war criminals. Notorious beneficiaries of ratlines included Adolf Eichmann, Josef Mengele, Erich Priebke, Rodolfo Freude (who became the first director of Argentine State Intelligence), and the Ustaše Head of State of Croatia, Ante Pavelić. It is still matter of debate whether the Argentine government of President Juan Perón was aware of the presence of these criminals on Argentine soil or not; but the consequence was that Argentina was considered a Nazi haven for several decades.

The flow of European immigration continued during the 1950s and afterward; but compared to the previous decade, it diminished considerably. The Marshall Plan implemented by the United States to help Europe recover from the consequences of World War II was working, and emigration lessened. During the period 1951–1960, only 242,889 Europeans entered Argentina: 142,829 were Italians, 98,801 were Spaniards, 934 were French, and 325 were Poles. The next decade (1961–1970), the total number of European immigrants barely reached 13,363 (9,514 Spaniards, 1,845 Poles, 1,266 French and 738 Russians).

European immigration was nearly non-existent during the 1970s and the 1980s. Instability from 1970 to 1976 in the form of escalating violence between Montoneros and the Triple A, guerrilla warfare, and the Dirty War waged against leftists after the March 1976 coup, was compounded by an economic crisis caused by the 1981 collapse of the dictatorship's domestic policies. This situation encouraged emigration rather than immigration of Europeans and European-Argentines alike, and during the 1971–1976 period at least 9,971 Europeans left the country. During the period 1976–1983 thousands of Argentines and numerous Europeans were kidnapped and killed in clandestine centers by the military dictatorship's grupos de tareas (task groups); these included Haroldo Conti, Dagmar Hagelin, Rodolfo Walsh, Léonie Duquet, Alice Domon, Héctor Oesterheld (all presumably assassinated in 1977) and Jacobo Timerman (who was liberated in 1979; sought exile in Israel, and returned in 1984). CONADEP, the commission formed by President Raúl Alfonsín, investigated and documented the existence of at least 8,960 cases, though other estimates vary between 13,000 and 30,000 dead.

=== Recent trends ===
The principal source of immigration into Argentina after 1960 was no longer from Europe, but rather from bordering South American countries. During the period in between the Censuses of 1895 and 1914, immigrants from Europe comprised 88.4% of the total, and Latin American immigrants represented only 7.5%. By the 1960s, however, this trend had been completely reversed: the Latin American immigrants were 76.1%, and the Europeans merely 18.7% of the total.

Given that the main sources of South American immigrants since the 1960s have been Bolivia, Paraguay and Peru, most of these immigrants have been either Amerindian or Mestizo, for they represent the ethnic majorities in those countries. The increasing numbers of immigrants from these sources has caused the proportion of Argentines of European descent to be reduced significantly in certain areas of the Greater Buenos Aires (particularly in Morón, La Matanza, Escobar and Tres de Febrero), as well as the Buenos Aires neighbourhoods of Flores, Villa Soldati, Villa Lugano and Nueva Pompeya. Many Amerindian or Mestizo people of Bolivian/Paraguayan/Peruvian origin have suffered racist discrimination, and in some cases, violence, or have been victims of sexual slavery and forced labor in textile sweat shops.

=== Latin American immigrants of European origin ===
Latin Americans of predominantly European descent have arrived from countries where there is a relevant proportion of white population Chile (52.7% to 68%), Brazil (47.7%), Venezuela (43.6%), Colombia (20% to 37%), Paraguay (20% to 30%) and in particular, Uruguay (88% to 94%). Uruguayan immigrants represent a very distinct case in Argentina, for they may pass unnoticed as "foreigners". Uruguay received a great part of the same influx of European immigrants that changed Argentina's ethnic profile, so most Uruguayans are of European origin. Uruguayans and Argentines also speak the same Spanish dialect (Rioplatense Spanish), which is heavily influenced by the intonation patterns of the Italian language's southern dialects.

The official censuses show a slow growth in the Uruguayan-born community: 51,100 in 1970, 114,108 in 1980, and 135,406 in 1991, with a decline to 117,564 in 2001. Around 218,000 Uruguayans emigrated to Argentina between 1960 and 1980, however.

=== Third immigratory wave from Eastern Europe (1994–2000) ===
Following the fall of the Communist regimes of the Soviet Union and Eastern Europe, the governments of the Western Bloc were worried about a possible massive exodus from Eastern Europe and Russia. President Carlos Saúl Menem – in the political framework of the Washington Consensus – offered to receive part of that emigratory wave in Argentina. Accordingly, Resolution 4632/94 was enacted on 19 December 1994, allowing "special treatment" for all the applicants who wished to emigrate from the former Soviet republics. A total of 9,399 Eastern Europeans emigrated to Argentina from January 1994 to December 2000, and of the total, 6,720 were Ukrainians (71.5%), 1,598 were Russians (17%), 160 Romanians (1.7%), 122 Bulgarians (1.3%), 94 Armenians (1%), 150 Georgians/Moldovans/Poles (1.6%) and 555 (5.9%) traveled with a Soviet passport.

Around 85% of the newcomers were under age 45, and 51% had a university education, so most integrated quite rapidly into Argentine society, albeit with some initial difficulties finding gainful employment. These also included some 200 Romanian Gypsy families that arrived in 1998, and 140 more Romanian Gypsies who migrated to Uruguay in 1999, but only to enter Argentina later by crossing the Uruguay River through Fray Bentos, Salto or Colonia.

European immigration in Argentina has not stopped since this wave from Eastern Europe. According to the National Bureau of Migrations, some 14,964 Europeans have settled in Argentina (3,599 Spaniards, 1,407 Italians and 9,958 from other countries) during the period 1999–2004. To this figure, many of the 8,285 Americans and 4,453 Uruguayans may be added, since these countries have European-descended majorities of 75% and 87% in their populations.

== Influences on Argentine culture ==
The culture of Argentina is the result of a fusion of European, Amerindian, Black African, and Arabic elements. The impact of European immigration on both Argentina's culture and demography has largely become mainstream and is shared by most Argentines, being no longer perceived as a separate "European" culture. Even those traditional elements that have Amerindian origin – as the mate and the Andean music – or Criollo origin – the asado, the empanadas, and some genres within folklore music – were rapidly adopted, assimilated and sometimes modified by the European immigrants and their descendants.

=== Tango ===
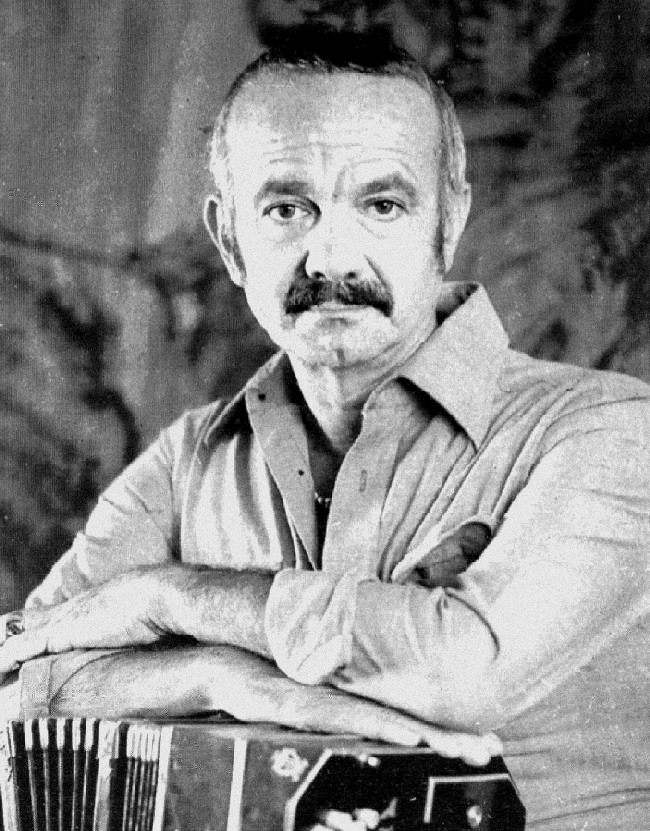
* Carlos Gardel (1890–1935) is the most famous singer-songwriter of classical tango; he was born in Toulouse, France, but his mother raised him in Buenos Aires.
* Ástor Piazzolla (1921–1992) was the creator of "New Tango" and one of the finest bandoneonists ever; his parents were Italian immigrants from Trani, Apulia.

Argentine tango is a hybrid genre, result of the fusion of different ethnic and cultural elements, so well intermingled that it is difficult to identify them separately. According to some experts, tango has combined elements from three main sources:

1) The music played by the Black African communities of the Río de la Plata region. Its very name might derive from a word in Yoruba -a Bantu language- and its rhythm appears to be based on candombe.

2) The milonga campera, a popular genre among the gauchos that lived in the Buenos Aires countryside, and later moved to the city looking for better jobs.

3) The music brought by the European immigrants: the Andalucian tanguillo, the polka, the waltz and the tarantella. They heavily influenced its melody and its sound by adding instruments such as piano, violin and -especially- bandoneón.

In spite of this tripartite origin, tango mainly developed as urban music, and was assimilated and embraced by European immigrants and their descendants; most icons of the genre were either European or had largely European ancestry.

=== Argentine Folk music ===
When the Spaniards arrived in what is now Argentina, the Amerindian inhabitants already had their own musical culture: instruments, dances, rhythms and styles. Much of that culture was lost during and after the conquest; only the music played by the Andean peoples survived in the shape of chants such as vidalas and huaynos, and in dances like the carnavalito. The peoples of Gran Chaco and Patagonia -areas that the Spaniards did not effectively occupied- kept their cultures almost untouched until the late 19th century.

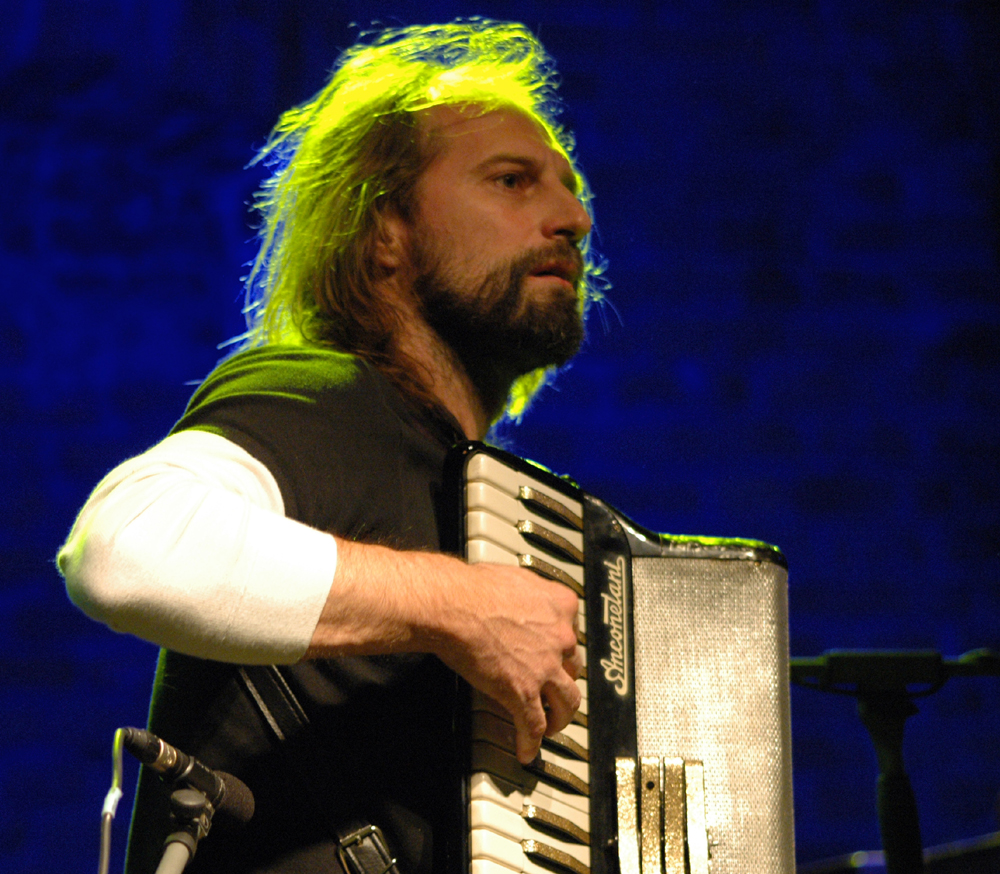
Chango Spasiuk is a prestigious composer and accordion player; his grandparents were Ukrainian immigrants who settled in Misiones.

The major Spanish contribution to music in the Río de la Plata area during the colonial period was the introduction of three instruments: the vihuela or guitarra criolla, the bombo legüero and the charango (a small guitar, similar to the tiple used in the Canary Islands; made with the shell of an armadillo). Once the Criollos obtained their independence from Spain, they had the chance to create new musical styles; dances like pericón, triunfo, gato and escondido, and chants such as cielito and vidalita all appeared during the post-independence period, primarily in the 1820s.

European immigration brought important changes to Argentina's popular music, especially in the Litoral; where new genres appeared, like chamamé and purajhei (or Paraguayan polka). Chamamé appeared in the second half of the 18th century -though it was not named as such until the 1930s- as a result of the fusion of ancient Guaraní rhythms with the music brought by the Volga German, Ukrainian, Polish and Ashkenazi Jewish immigrants that settled in the region. The newcomers added the melodic style of their polkas and waltzes to the native rhythmic base, and played it with their own instruments, such as accordions and violins.

Other genres -like chacarera and zamba- developed as an integral fusion of Amerindian and European influences. While traditionally played on guitars, charangos and bombos, they also began to be played with other European instruments, such as piano; one notable example is Sixto Palavecino's use of the violin to play the chacarera. Regardless of the origin of the different rhythms and styles, later European immigrants and their descendants rapidly assimilated the local music and contributed to those genres creating new songs.

=== Sports ===
Many sports that nowadays are very popular in Argentina were introduced by European immigrants -particularly by the British- in the late 18th and early 19th centuries.

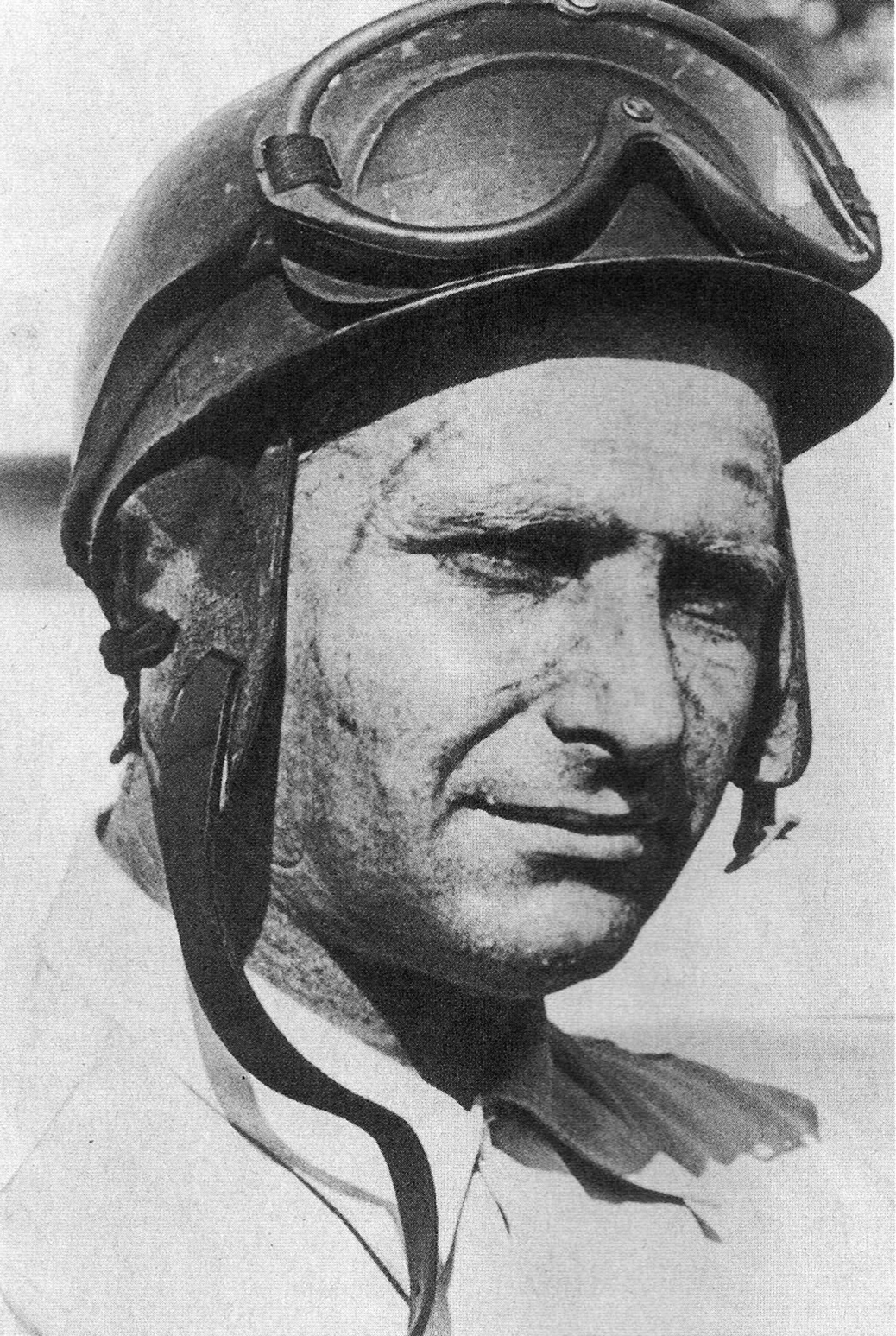
Juan Manuel Fangio (1911–1995) was an F1 racer of Italian parents, born in Balcarce.

Football is by far the most popular sport in Argentina. It was brought by the British railway businessmen and workers, and it was later embraced with passion by the other collectivities. The first official football match ever played in Argentina took place on 20 June 1867, when the "White Caps" beat the "Red Caps" by 4–0. A look at the list of players -eight by team- shows a collection of British names/surnames. "White Caps": Thomas Hogg, James Hogg, Thomas Smith, William Forrester, James W. Bond, E. Smith, Norman Smith and James Ramsbotham. "Red Caps": Walter Heald, Herbert Barge, Thomas Best, Urban Smith, John Wilmott, R. Ramsay, J. Simpson and William Boschetti. The development of this sport in Argentina was greatly boosted by Scottish teacher Alexander Watson Hutton. He arrived in Argentina in 1882 and founded the Buenos Aires English High School in 1884, hiring his countryman William Walters as coach of the school's football team. On 21 February 1893 Watson founded the Argentine Association Football League, the historical antecedent of the Asociación de Fútbol Argentino. Watson's son Arnold continued the tradition playing during the amateur age of Argentine football.

Tennis was also imported by the British immigrants; in April 1892 they founded the Buenos Aires Lawn Tennis Club. Among the founding members, we find all British surnames: Arthur Herbert, W. Watson, Adrian Penard, C. Thursby, H. Mills and F. Wallace. Soon their example was followed by British immigrants who resided in Rosario; F. Still, T. Knox, W. Birschoyle, M. Leywe and J. Boyles founded the Rosario Lawn Tennis.

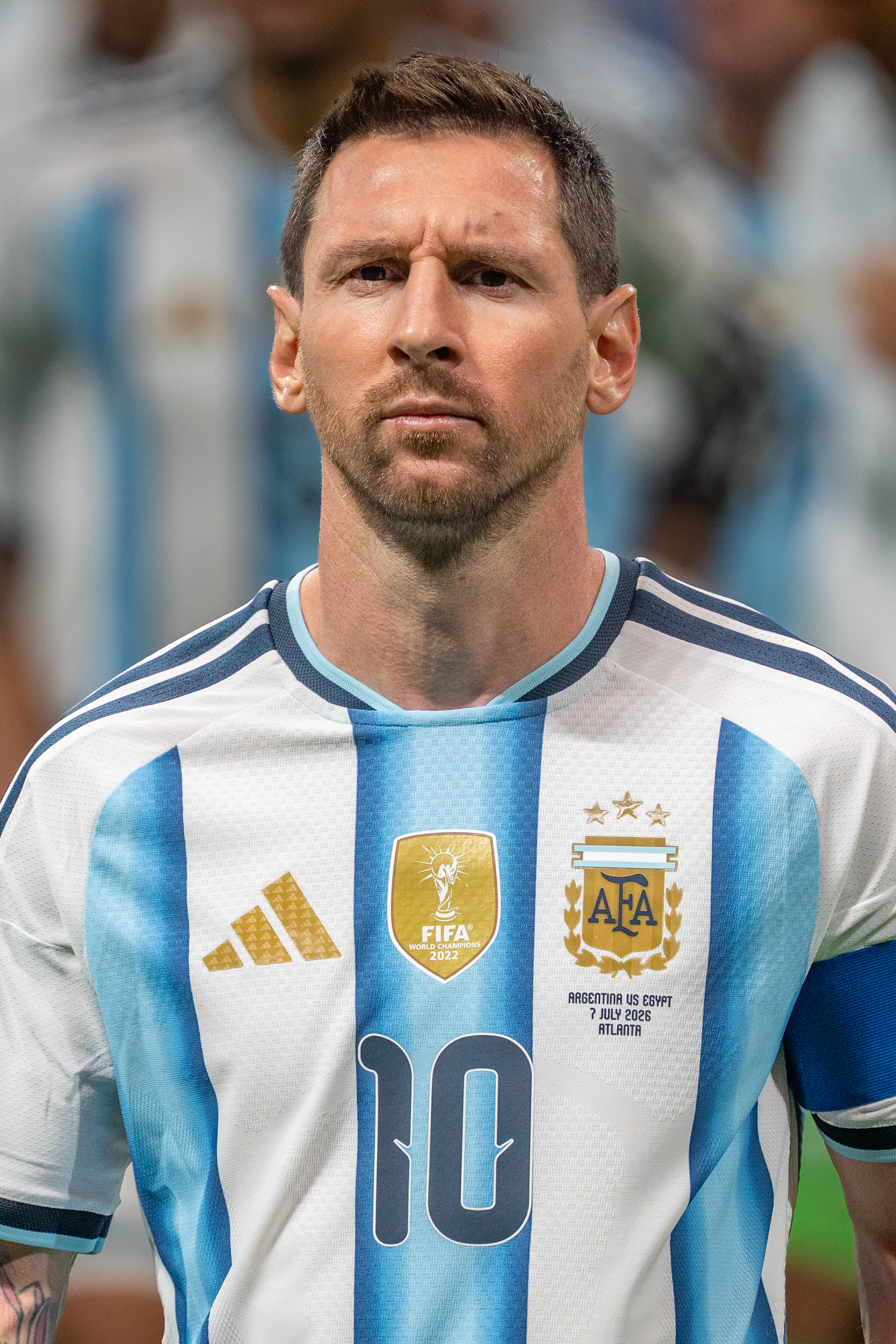
Lionel Messi is a football player of Italian and Spanish ancestry. He is considered one of the best football players of all time.

The first Argentine tennis player of European descent to achieve some international success was Mary Terán de Weiss in the 1940s and 1950s; the sport, however, was considered an elite men's sport and her efforts to popularize this activity among women did not prosper at the time. Guillermo Vilas, who is of Spanish descent, won the French Open and the US Open both in 1977, and two Australian Open in 1978 and 1979, and popularized the sport in Argentina.

Another sport in which Argentines with European ancestry have stood out is car racing. The greatest exponent was Juan Manuel Fangio, whose parents were both Italian. He won five Formula One World titles in 1951, 1954, 1955, 1956 and 1957; his five-championships record remained unbeaten until 2003, when Michael Schumacher obtained his sixth F1 trophy. Another exponents are Carlos Alberto Reutemann (his grandfather was German Swiss, and his mother was Italian), who reached the second place in the World Drivers' Championship of 1981.

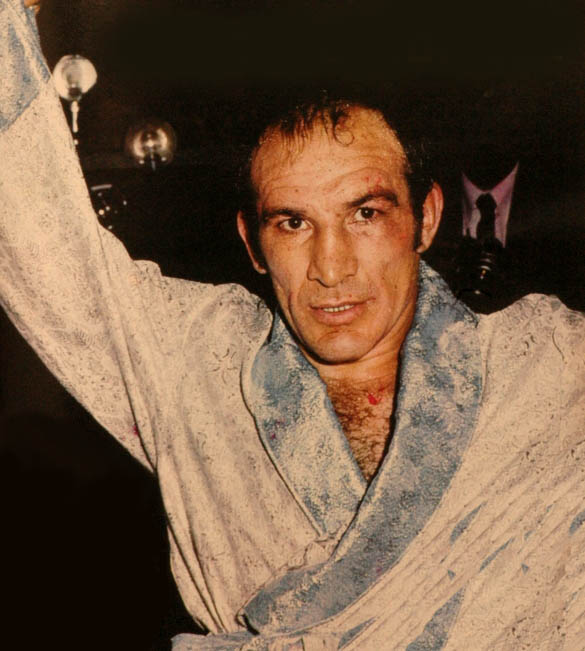
Nicolino Locche (1939–2005) was a professional boxer born in Tunuyán, Mendoza from Italian parents. He was nicknamed "the Untouchable".

Boxing is another popular sport which was also brought by the British immigrants. The first championship ever organized in Argentina took place in December 1899, and the champion was Jorge Newbery (son of a White American odontologist who migrated after the American Civil War), one of the pioneers of boxing, car racing and aviation in the country. A list of Argentine boxers of European descent should include: Luis Ángel Firpo (nicknamed "the wild bull of the pampas", whose father was Italian and his mother was Spanish), Nicolino Locche (who was nicknamed "the Untouchable" for his defensive style; both his parents were Italian), etc.

Golf was brought to Argentina by Scottish Argentine Valentín Scroggie, who established the nation's first golf course in San Martín, Buenos Aires in 1892. The Argentine Golf Association was founded in 1926 and includes over 43,000 members.

Hockey was another sport imported by the British immigrants in the early 20th century. It was initially played in the clubs founded by the British citizens until 1908, when the first official matches between Belgrano Athletic, San Isidro Club y Pacific Railways (today San Martín) took place. That same year the Asociación Argentina de Hockey was founded, and its first president was Thomas Bell. In 1909 this Association allowed the formation of female teams. One of the first feminine teams was Belgrano Ladies; they played their first match on 25 August 1909, against St. Catherine's College, winning by 1 to 0.

Cycling was introduced by Italian immigrants in Argentina in 1898, when they founded the Club Ciclista Italiano. One of the first South American champions in this sport was an Argentine of Italian descent, Clodomiro Cortoni.

Rugby was also brought by British immigrants. The first rugby match ever played in Argentina took place in 1873; the teams were Bancos (Banks) against Ciudad (City). In 1886, the Buenos Aires Football Club and Rosario Athletic Club played the first official match between clubs. The River Plate Rugby Championship was founded on 10 April 1889, and was the direct antecedent of the Unión Argentina de Rugby, created to organize local championships; the founding clubs were Belgrano Athletic, Buenos Aires Football Club, Lomas Athletic and Rosario Athletic. Its first president was Leslie Corry Smith, and Lomas Athletic was the first champion that same year.

=== Cuisine ===
Italians and the Spanish introduced European staples such as pasta, pizza, milanesa, sausages, empanadas and desserts such as pionono and alfajores to Argentina. German, Polish, and Austrian immigrants brought goulash and sauerkraut to eastern Argentina.

== See also ==
- Argentine people
- Armenian Argentines
- Austrian Argentines
- Albanians in South America
- Basque Argentines
- Belarusian Argentines
- Bulgarians in South America
- Croatian Argentines
- Czechs in Argentina
- Danish Argentines
- Dutch Argentines
- Demographics of Argentina
- Emigration from Europe
- English Argentines
- Estonian Argentines
- Finnish Argentines
- French Argentines
- German Argentines
- Greek Argentines
- Hungarian Argentines
- Immigration in Argentina
- Irish Argentines
- Italian Argentines
- Lithuanian Argentines
- Latvian diaspora
- Macedonian Argentines
- Montenegrin Argentines
- Polish Argentines
- Portuguese Argentines
- Racism in Argentina
- Romanian Argentines
- Russian Argentines
- Scottish Argentines
- Serbian Argentines
- Slovene Argentines
- Spanish Argentines
- Swedish Argentines
- Swiss Argentines
- Ukrainian Argentines
- Welsh Argentines
- White Brazilians
- White Latin Americans
