= Danish Argentines =

People of Danish ancestry in Argentina

Dano-argentino (Spanish)
- (Argentina) (Denmark)
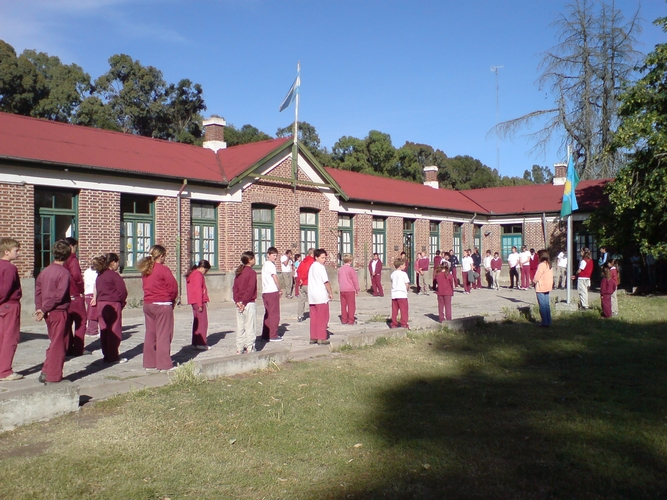
- Children next to the Argentine Danish School, in Tres Arroyos, Buenos Aires

Total population
- 300,000 (by ancestry)

Regions with significant populations
- Buenos Aires · Misiones · Río Negro

Languages
- Majority: Spanish; Minority: Danish · Faroese

Religion
- Mainly Christianity (Lutheranism)

Related ethnic groups
- Danes; Danish Americans · Danish Canadians · Nordic Brazilians · Danish Australians

Danish Argentines are Argentine citizens of Danish ancestry or people who emigrated from Denmark and reside in Argentina. Danish immigration to Argentina was particularly intense between the late 19th and early 20th centuries. It is estimated that between 1857 and 1930, about 18,000 Danes settled in Argentina.[1] This wave of immigration was the third largest in the Danish diaspora, behind the United States and Australia. The community also includes Faroese and Greenlandic Argentines due to the Faroe Islands' and Greenland's status as autonomous territories of Denmark.

To preserve their language and traditions, early Danish immigrants established a network of churches, schools, and newspapers. While most Danes integrated into the Argentine agricultural economy as farmers, they maintained their cultural identity through these institutions for several generations.

== History ==
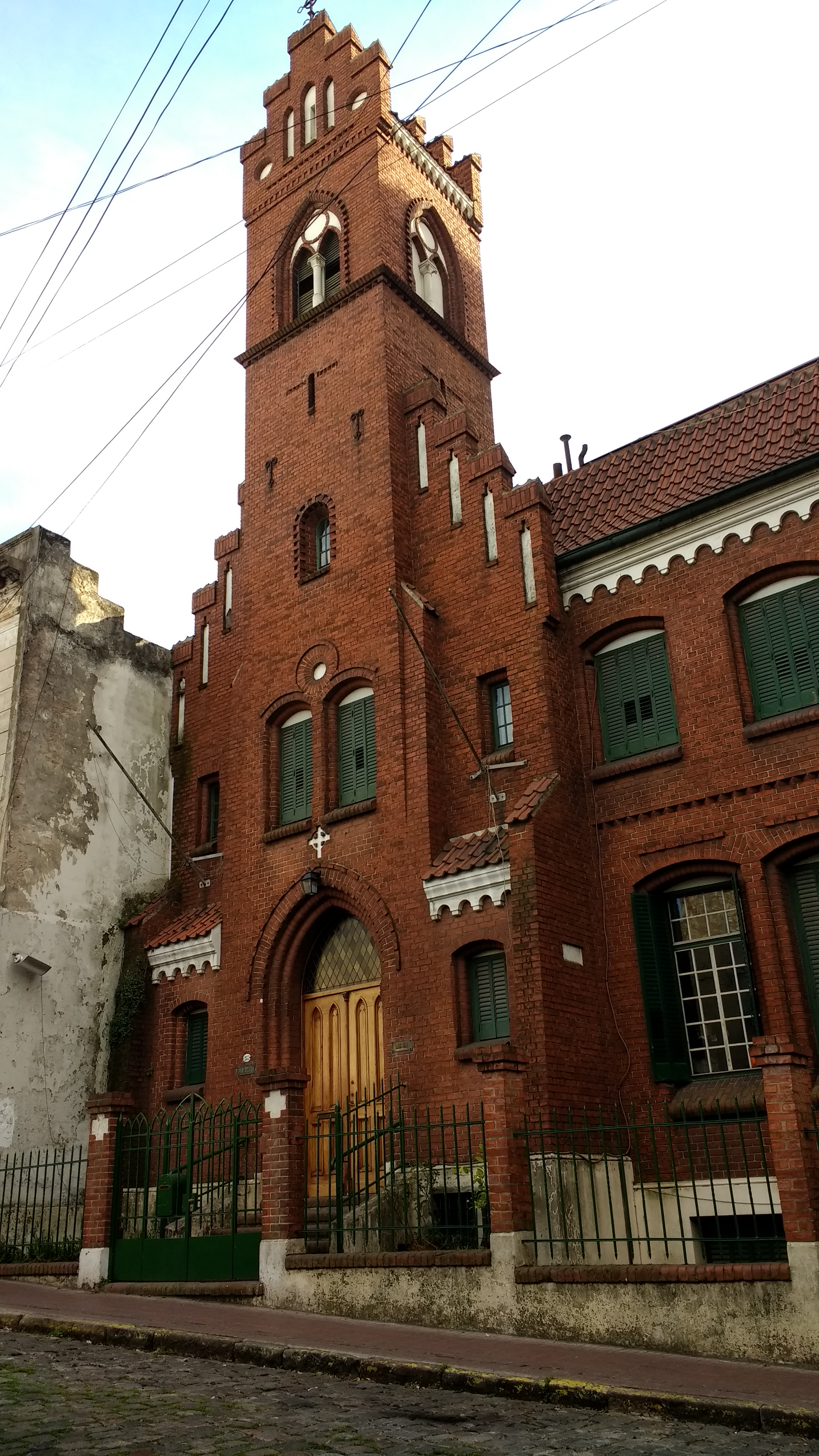
Danish Church of San Telmo in Buenos Aires.

Around 350,000 emigrants left Denmark between 1860 and 1930. Official records of Danish arrivals in Argentina are incomplete before 1886, as they were often grouped in general European immigration categories. Between 1886 and 1890, approximately 1,300 Danish immigrants were recorded. From 1900 to 1905, over 1,000 Danes arrived, a figure that tripled during the 1911–1915 period. Following 1922, the number of new arrivals decreased significantly.

== Settlement ==
The majority of Danish immigrants settled in the Bueno Aries Province. They formed rural communities in an area south of Bueno Aries that became known as the "Dane Triangle" (Danish: Danskertrekanten), encompassing the towns of Tandil, Necochea, and Tres Arroyos. Another significant Danish settlement as established in the subtropical Misiones Province, particularly in the Oberá and Eldorado regions of the Argentine Mesopotamia.

== See also ==
- Argentina–Denmark relations
- Danish diaspora
- Argentines of European descent
- Finnish Argentine
- Swedish Argentine
