= Nidia Morrell =

Argentine astronomer

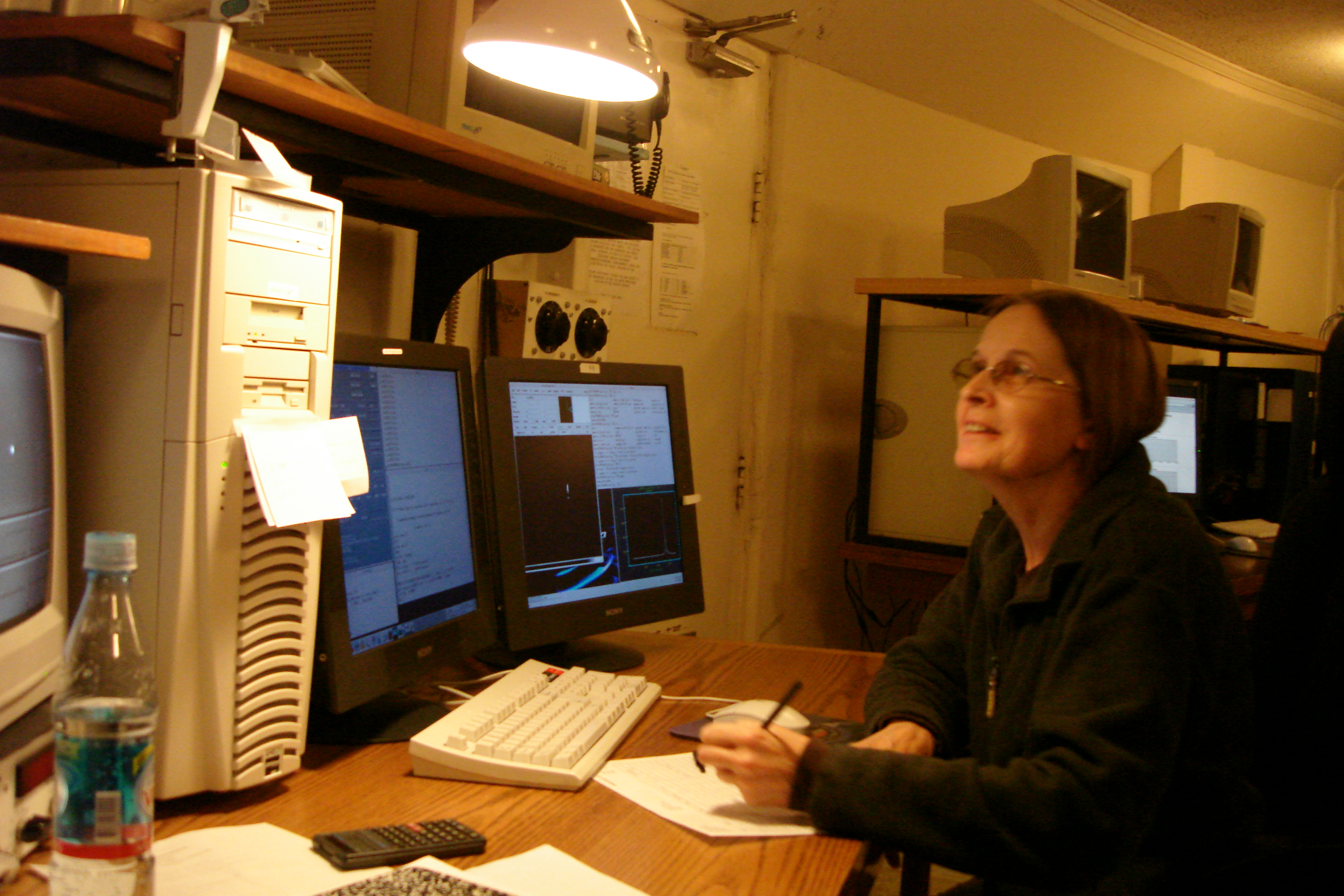
- Born: Nidia Irene Morrell; 3 July 1953 (age 73); Mar del Plata, Argentina
- Education: National University of La Plata
- Occupation: Astronomer
- Employer: Las Campanas Observatory

Nidia Irene Morrell (born 3 July 1953) is an Argentine astronomer who is a permanent staff member at the Las Campanas Observatory in La Serena, Chile. She was a member of the Massive Stars research group led by Virpi Niemelä and the Hubble Heritage Project. Professionally, she is known for her numerous contributions related to the astrophysics of massive stars. She participates in the systematic search for variations of brightness in stellar objects, including the observation of a candidate for the Thorne–Żytkow object. She was also a member of the team that discovered the supernova ASASSN-15lh.

== Career ==
Nidia Morrell studied astronomy at the National University of La Plata (UNLP), obtaining a licentiate in 1977 and a doctorate in 1984. She received a postdoctoral fellowship (1989–1990) sponsored by the National Scientific and Technical Research Council (CONICET) to conduct research in the United States, advised by Helmut Altrichter at the Kitt Peak National Observatory. Back in Argentina, she researched and taught at the UNLP Faculty of Astronomical and Geophysical Sciences.

She focused her work on young (mostly O-type and Wolf-Rayet) stars, in regions of star formation and binary stars of large masses, also called massive stars. That type of star quickly consumes its fuel, and ends its existence with a giant explosion: a supernova.

In La Plata, Morrell was a member of the Massive Stars research group led by Virpi Niemelä. She and Niemelä were part of the Hubble Heritage Project, which generated widely disseminated educational resources. From 1996 to 2001, Morrell was a representative of Argentina and a scientific advisor to the Gemini South Observatory.

For years she was one of the main users of the Jorge Sahade Telescope at the Leoncito Astronomical Complex (CASLEO). Many students, who are now astronomers and teachers, made their first observations with her at El Leoncito.

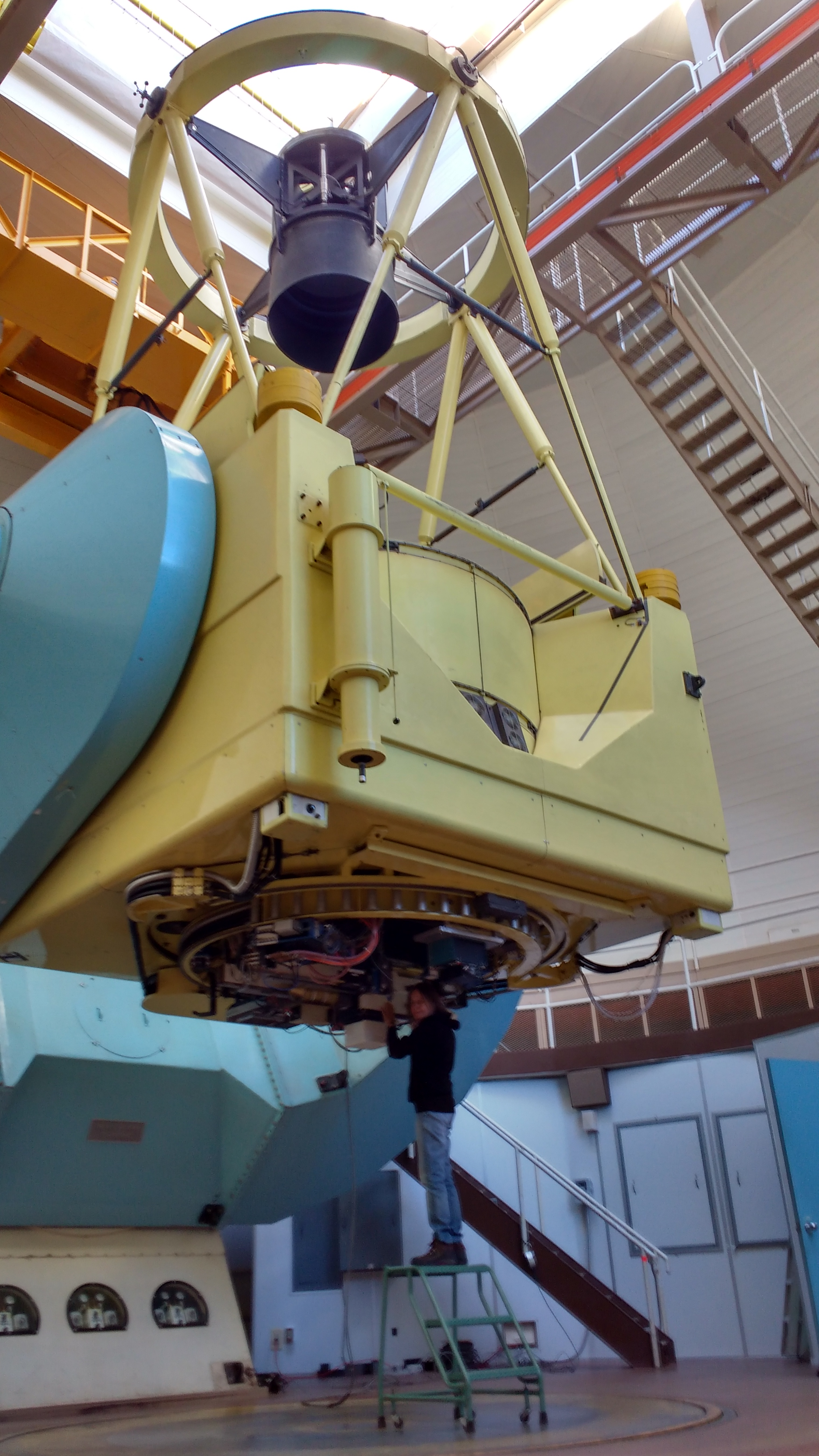
Nidia Morrell pointing a telescope

In late 2002, Morrell joined the scientific team at Las Campanas Observatory and, later, the Carnegie Supernova Project (as a part-time researcher), while continuing to collaborate on massive star studies. She was also a visiting professor at the National Autonomous University of Honduras and the National Autonomous University of Nicaragua.

In 2006 she settled in La Serena, Chile to continue her research. Among her most outstanding observations, she participated in the discovery of ASASSN-15lh, the brightest supernova ever detected.

Since 2008, Morrell has also participated in Chilean Observation Time Assignment Committees, contributing her knowledge about instruments and procedures for astronomical observation.

In 2009, she appeared in the documentary video El silencio de las Campanas made by Ricardo Benítez, which follows the daily activity of astronomers at a high-level observatory.

In 2014 she was one of the leaders in the detection of a possible hybrid star or Thorne–Żytkow object, which had been a theoretical postulate for years. This discovery involved the Magellan Telescopes. The chemical characteristics of this star, HV 2112, were studied using spectroscopy techniques, in which Morrell is an expert.

== Beliefs ==
Throughout her career, Morrell has motivated students of all ages to participate in scientific projects. She has also joined professional initiatives to raise awareness of respecting the sky as world heritage.

While nowhere in the world are resources abundant, I would say that science is going through a wonderful moment, where international collaboration is clearer and more fluid than ever (especially because of the ease of sharing information and knowledge through the Internet).

She is a staunch defender of the use of free software, free knowledge, and the equality and inclusion of all human beings. She has also collaborated with amateur astronomers who contribute to the search for supernovae from their homes.

I live my whole life with astronomy. Maybe that is the greatest achievement, the fulfillment of a vocation, although other things in life have not gone well, being able to dedicate oneself to something that one likes so much is a valuable achievement, a privilege if you will.

== Recognitions ==
For her passion for astronomy, her dedication to mentoring students, and the enormous amount of observational data she has gathered, the international conference Massive Stars and Supernovae was held in celebration of her 65th birthday. The event took place from 5 to 9 November 2018 in Bariloche, Argentina, with the institutional support of the National University of Río Negro (UNRN), the UNLP Faculty of Astronomical and Geophysical Sciences, the Argentine Astronomy Association, the Carnegie Institution for Science, and the Municipality of Bariloche.

Both for Dr. Morrell's scientific achievements and for her charisma, in the course of this meeting it was announced that the International Astronomical Union named an asteroid (Minor Planet 25906) in her honor.
