= Czechs in Argentina =

Czechs who migrated to Argentina

Czech Argentines
Checo-argentinos (Spanish) Čeští Argentinci (Czech)
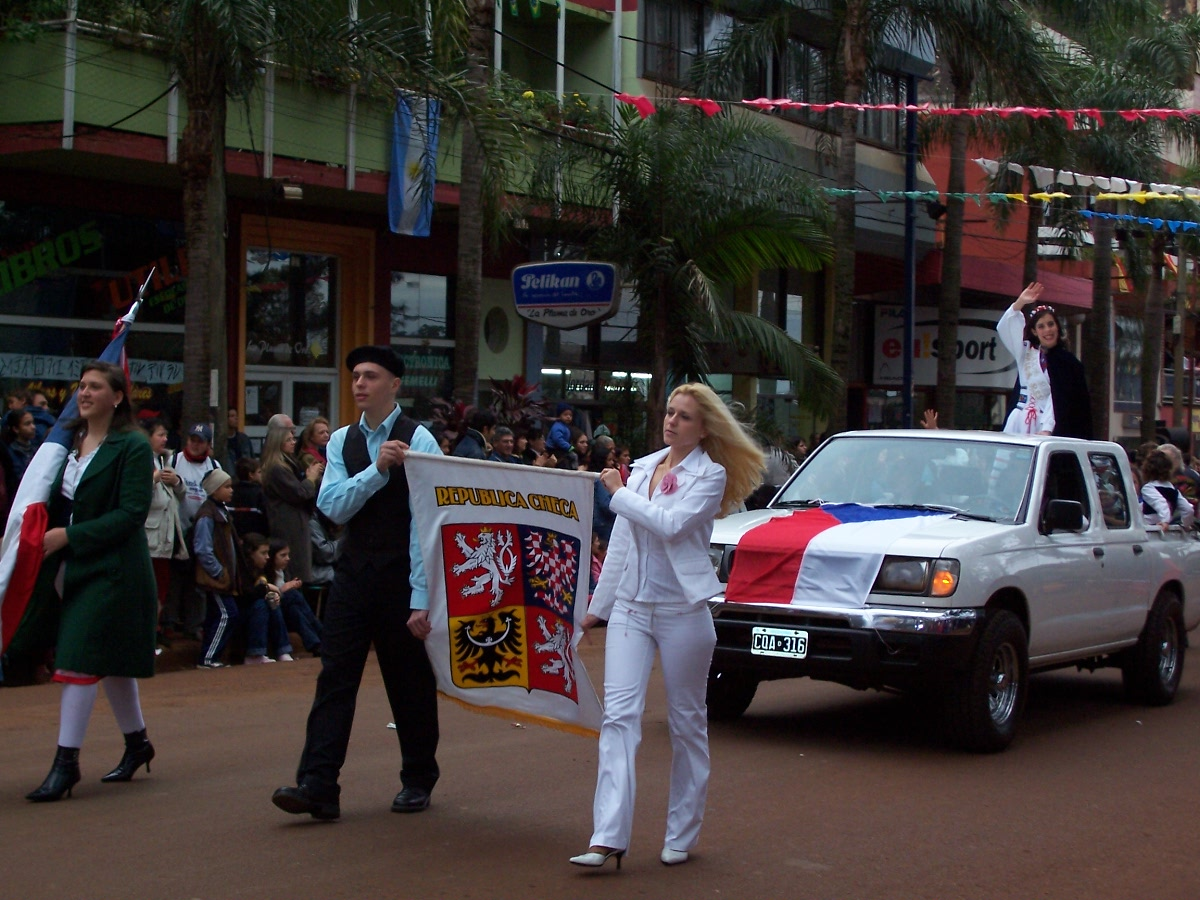

Total population
- 125,000 (2024)

Regions with significant populations
- Buenos Aires · Santa Fe · Chaco · Misiones

Languages
- Spanish · Czech

Religion
- Christianity · Judaism · Others

Related ethnic groups
- Czechs · Other Argentines

As of 2025, there are around 125,000 people of Czech and Slovak descent living in Argentina. Argentina has the largest Czech community in Latin America. Czech immigration to Argentina began duringe World War I; there were four successive waves. Czechs settled mainly in Buenos Aires, Gran La Plata, Rosario and Chaco.

== Immigration waves ==
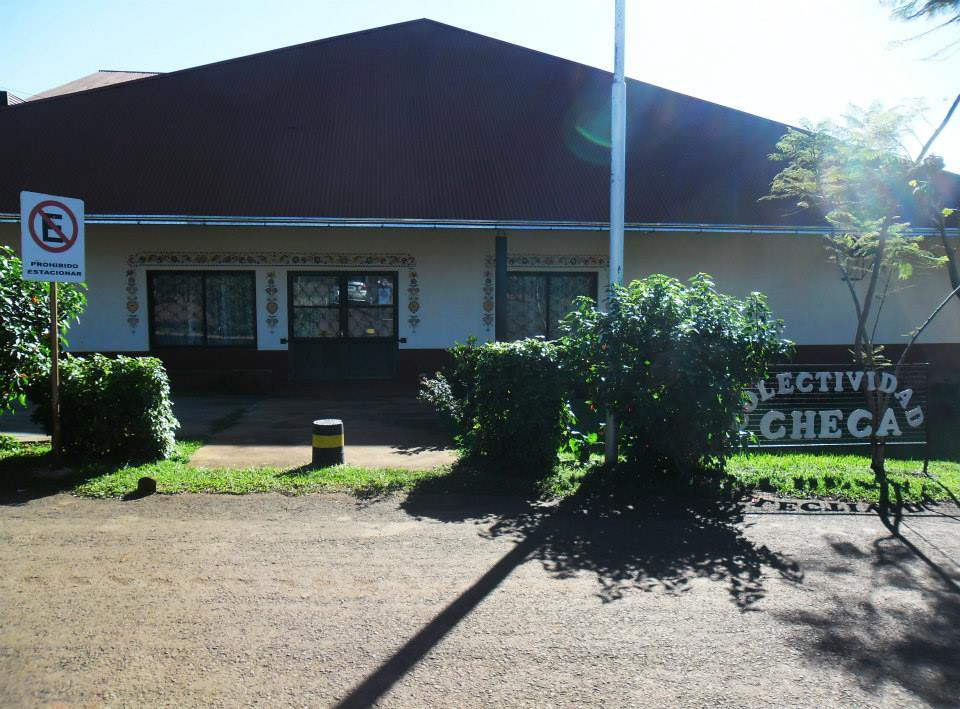
House of the Czech community in Oberá, Misiones province.

There were four successive waves of Czech immigration to Argentina recognized as substantial:

- slightly before World War 1,
- from 1920 to 1930,
- during World War II
- and the smallest, during 1990 (after the fall of communism in Eastern Europe).

During the first two periods, migrants were mainly workers and farmers motivated by economic reasons.

During the third period, Czech political exiles arrived, fleeing mainly due to the Nazi encroachment in Central Europe.

The final group included various social classes; they migrated for economic reasons and due to personal interests.

The largest community of Czech descendants in Argentina is found in the city of Saénz Peña, in the province of Chaco. According to research, its origins date back to 1913, with the arrival of immigrants Juan Novotny and Pedro Šašvata to the city. Over the decades, the Czech community founded a cooperative, two sports clubs and other associations in which one can still learn Czech and typical dances.

== See also ==
- Argentina–Czech Republic relations
- Czechs
- Argentines of European descent
