= Argentina–Finland relations =

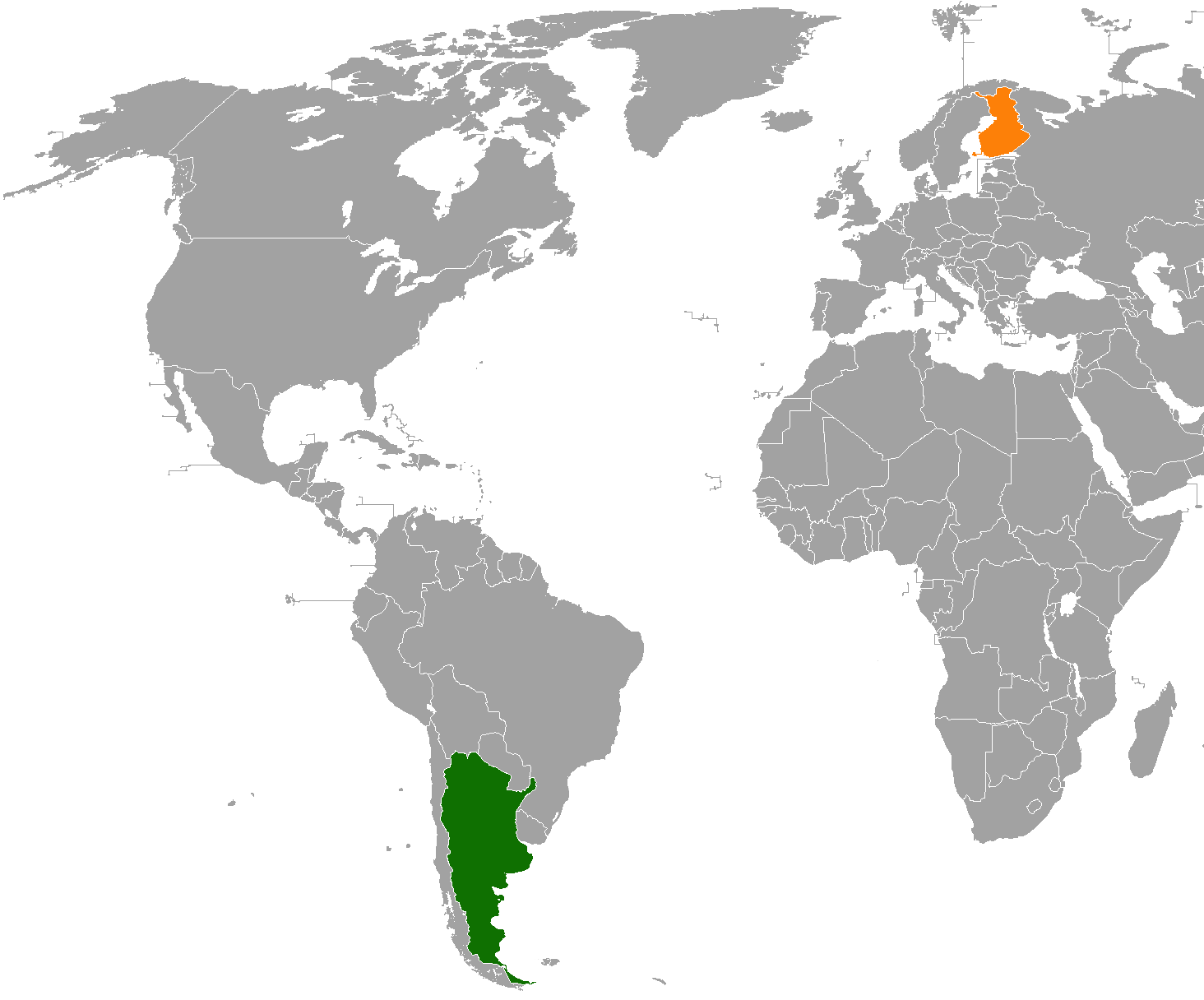
- Argentina: Finland

Bilateral relations between the Argentina and Finland, have existed for over a century.

== History ==
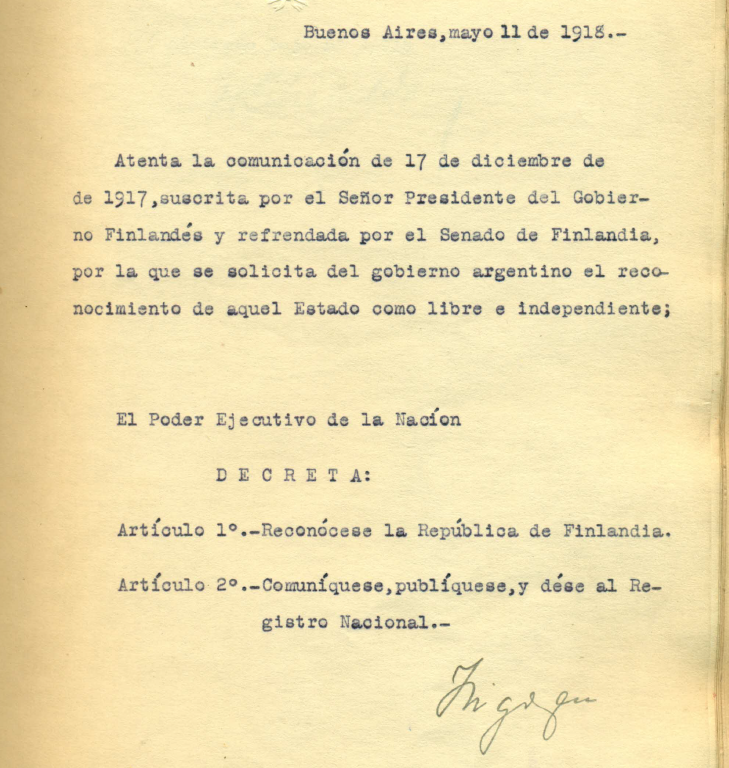
Argentine presidential decree recognizing Finland as an independent nation.

The first Finnish immigrants arrived to Argentina in 1906 and founded Colonia Finlandes in the vicinity of the town of Oberá, Misiones Province. In May 1918, Finland regained its Independence from Russia after the Finnish Civil War. Argentina recognized the independence of Finland on 11 May 1918, becoming the first nation outside of Europe to do so. Soon afterwards, both nations established diplomatic relations and Finland opened a consulate in Buenos Aires. In 1923, Argentina accredited an ambassador to Finland from its embassy in Warsaw, Poland while Finland accredited an ambassador to Argentina from its embassy in Madrid, Spain. In 1929, Finland opened a resident embassy in Buenos Aires, becoming its first embassy in Latin America.

During World War II, Finland was invaded by the Soviet Union which triggered the Winter War. Argentina supported Finland diplomatically during the war and asked the League of Nations to expel the Soviet Union from the group for its aggression against Finland. During the war, Finland continued to maintain a resident embassy in Buenos Aires. Soon after the war, in January 1946, Finnish ships began arriving again to Argentina with Finnish made products. In 1997, Finnish President Martti Ahtisaari paid an official visit to Argentina, becoming the first high-level Finnish politician to visit the country. In 1998, Argentine President Carlos Menem paid an official visit to Finland.

In 2007, UPM, a Finnish pulp company, opened a mill in Fray Bentos, Uruguay just across the river from Argentina. During the construction of the mill, Argentina filed a complaint against the company and the Uruguayan government stating possible pollution of the river by the mill. The Uruguay River is shared by the two countries and is protected by a treaty, which requires both parties to inform the other of any project that might affect the river. Besides the issue of pollution, Argentina claimed that the Uruguayan government had not asked for permission to build the mill. This diplomatic incident became known as the Uruguay River pulp mill dispute. The dispute was brought before the International Court of Justice which said that Uruguay had breached its procedural obligations to inform Argentina of its plans but had not violated its environmental obligations under the treaty and therefore the Finnish mill could continue operations.

In October 2016, Finnish Prime Minister Juha Sipilä paid a visit to Argentina. During his visit, he met with Argentine President Mauricio Macri and both leaders discussed exploring new possibilities for cooperation between both nations and in their respective private sectors. In May 2018, both nations celebrated 100 years of diplomatic relations.

== High-level visits ==
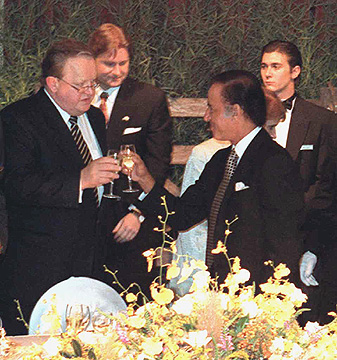
President Carlos Menem organized a reception in honor of President Martti Ahtisaari during his official visit to the country in 1997

High-level visits from Argentina to Finland

- President Carlos Menem (1998)
- Vice President Gabriela Michetti (2018)

High-level visits from Finland to Argentina

- Foreign Minister Paavo Väyrynen (1985)
- Foreign Trade Minister Pertti Salolainen (1990)
- Foreign Trade Minister Ole Norrback (1996, 1997)
- President Martti Ahtisaari (1997)
- Prime Minister Juha Sipilä (2016)

== Bilateral agreements ==
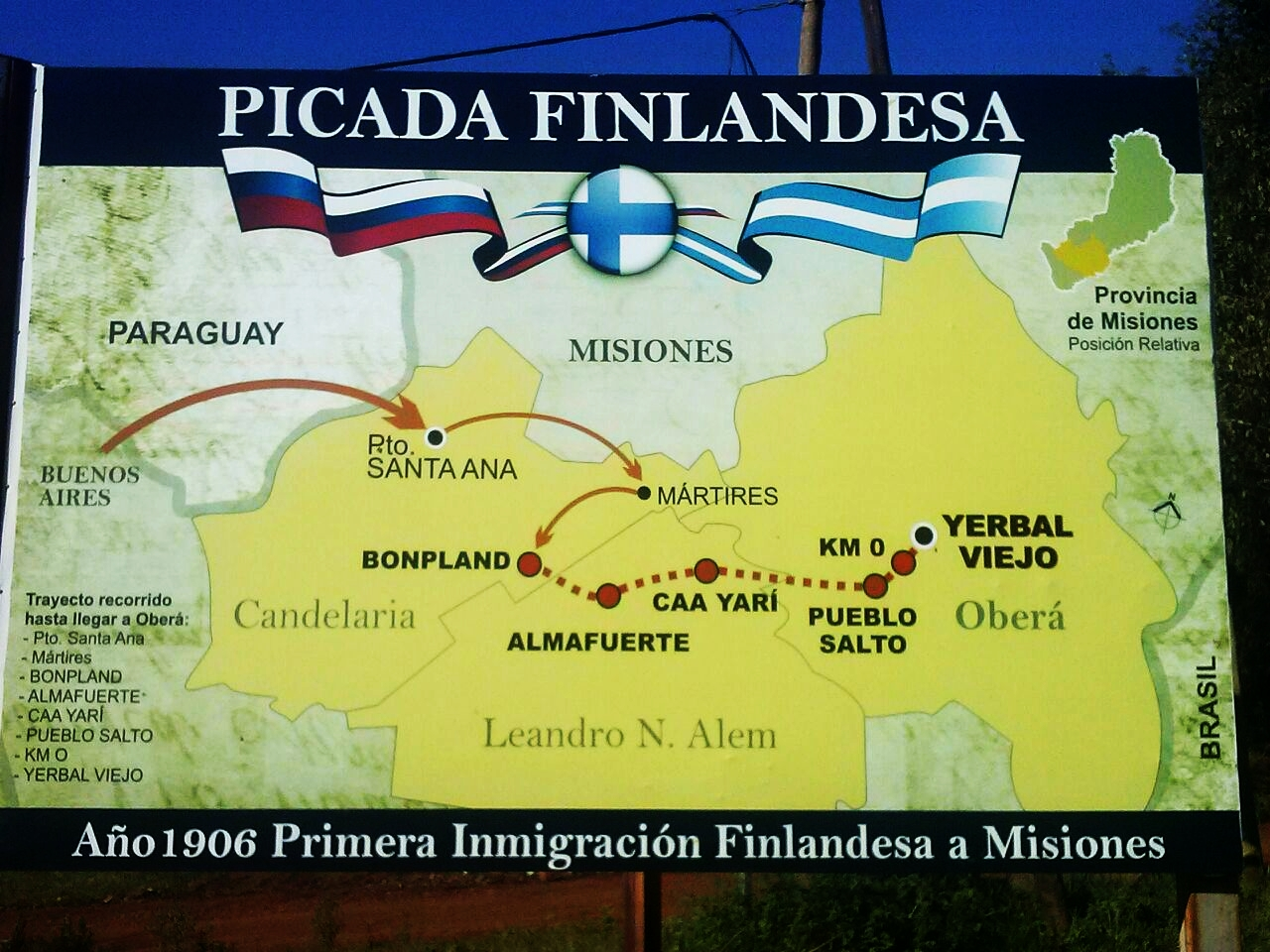
Finnish immigration monument to Misiones Province, Argentina

Both nations have signed a few bilateral agreements such as an Agreement on Trade (1935); Agreement to not wage war on each other (1938); Agreement on the removal of visas in ordinary passports (1961); Agreement on Trade, Technology and Industry Cooperation (1980); Agreement on Investment Protection (1993) and an Agreement on the Avoidance of Double Taxation (1994).

== Trade ==
In 2017, trade between Argentina and Finland totaled US$389 million. Argentina's main export products to Finland include: metallic minerals; beverages, wines and vinegar; fruits, seeds and meats. Finland's main export products to Argentina include: machines, appliances and electrical equipment; mechanical devices; nuclear reactors and industrial instruments; paper and cardboard; vehicles and chemical based products.

== Resident diplomatic missions ==
- Argentina has an embassy in Helsinki.
- Finland has an embassy in Buenos Aires.
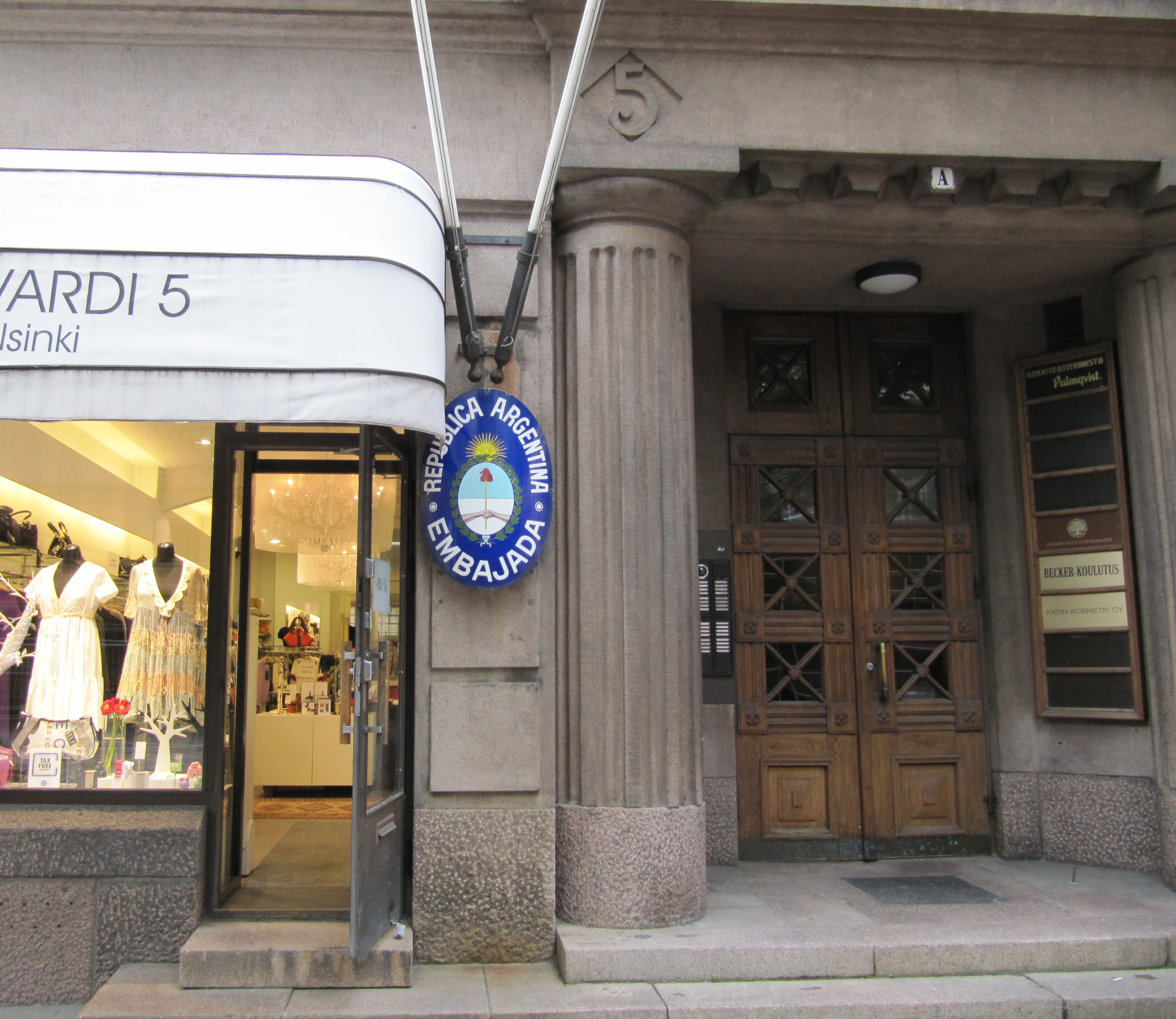
Embassy of Argentina in Helsinki

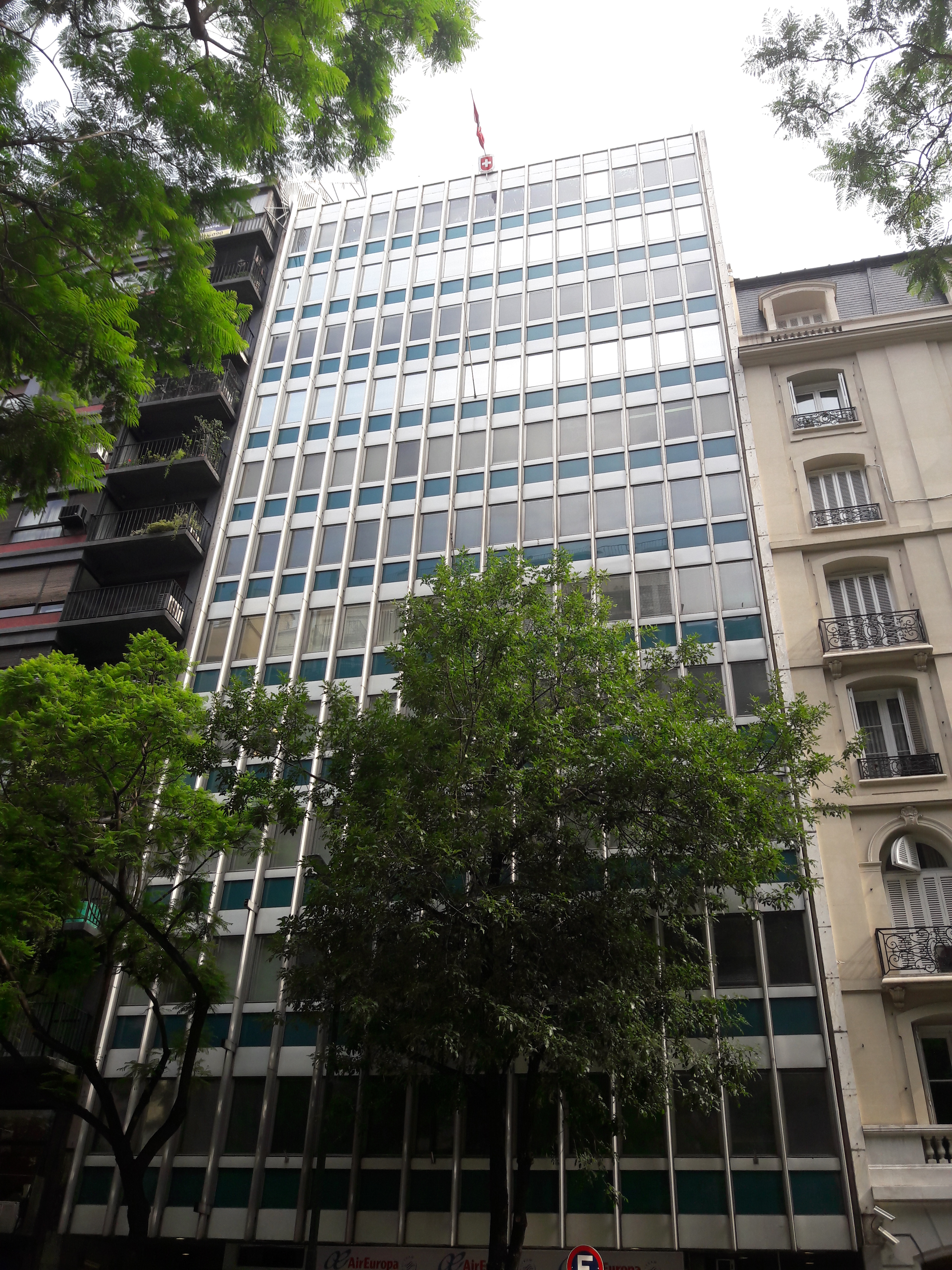
Embassy of Finland in Buenos Aires

== See also ==
- Foreign relations of Argentina
- Foreign relations of Finland
- Finnish Argentine
- Latin American migration to Finland
