= Estonian Argentines =

Ethnic group in Argentina

Argentina eestlased (Estonian) Estonio-argentinos (Spanish)
- (Estonia) (Argentina)

Total population
- 1,500 (by birth) + unknown (by ancestry)

Regions with significant populations
- Mainly in the Greater Buenos Aires

Languages
- Spanish · Estonian

Religion
- Majority: Protestantism; Minority: Irreligion · Deism

Related ethnic groups
- Estonians · Estonian Americans · Estonian Australians · Estonian Canadians

Estonian Argentines (Estonian: Argentina eestlased
Spanish: Estonio-argentinos) are Argentine citizens of Estonian descent or Estonia-born people who emigrated to Argentina. Argentina is home to the fourth largest Estonian community in the Americas, behind the United States, Canada and Brazil.

Estonian immigration to Argentina began in the early twentieth century and continued after the Second World War. Despite not having arrived in large numbers as other nationalities, the Estonian presence was important, settling mainly in Buenos Aires, Buenos Aires Province and elsewhere within their new country.

== History ==
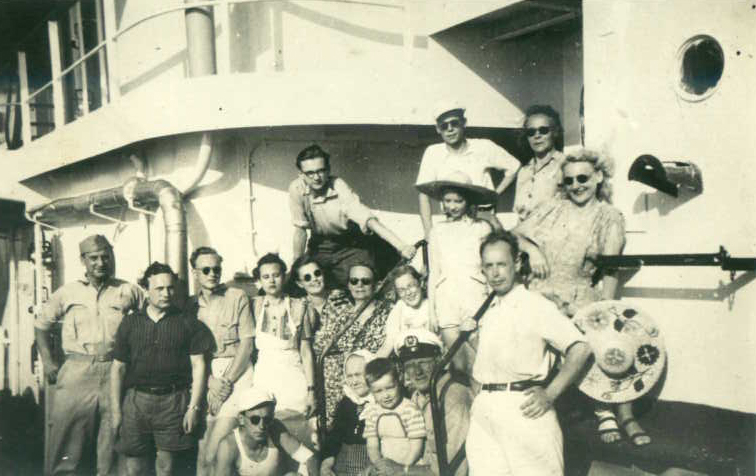
Estonian immigrants who arrived in Argentina from Germany in 1949.

Estonians have a significant diaspora, especially created after the Second World War. There are approximately 1,100,000 Estonians in the world, of which 930,000 live in Estonia representing 85% of the total, the remaining 15% is distributed primarily in Finland, the United States, Canada, Sweden, and Russia.

There are organised groups of Estonians in more than 20 countries such as Argentina, Australia, Austria, Brazil, Canada, the United Kingdom, Finland, France, Germany, Latvia, Lithuania, the Netherlands, New Zealand, Norway, Portugal, Russia, South Africa, Sweden, Switzerland, Ukraine and the United States.

Most Estonians and their descendants in Latin America are in Argentina (mainly in Buenos Aires) and Brazil (being São Paulo the main destination), where as small communities continue to operate. Many Estonians who immigrated to Brazil left this country to return home or to move to other places in North America (mainly the U.S.) and South America (mainly Argentina).

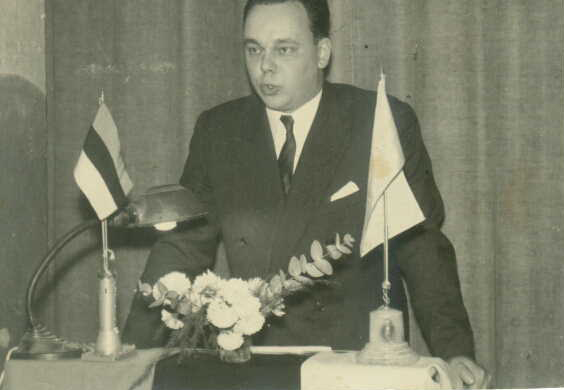
A speech at the Estonian Society of Argentina in Buenos Aires by Estonian immigrant Allan Soonets Kippasto.

In 1924, Estonians founded "The Estonian Society of Argentina" (Estonian: Argentina Eesti Selts, Spanish: Sociedad Estonia de Argentina), i.e., much earlier than in other countries with a larger number of Estonians. At the end of the second decade of the 20th century there were about 3,000 Estonians in Argentina.

Today, about 1,500 Estonians reside in Argentina, who are mostly interested in the development of relations between Estonia and Argentina. In 2006, to meet the needs of Estonians living in Argentina, a consular mission was organised in Buenos Aires. During the mission, the consul of Estonia who resides in New York City held various consular services for local Estonians.

The Estonian community in Buenos Aires consists of about 50 families with Estonian roots. Members of the younger generations have only a small knowledge of the Estonian due to the preference for the Spanish as their mother tongue.

== Religion ==
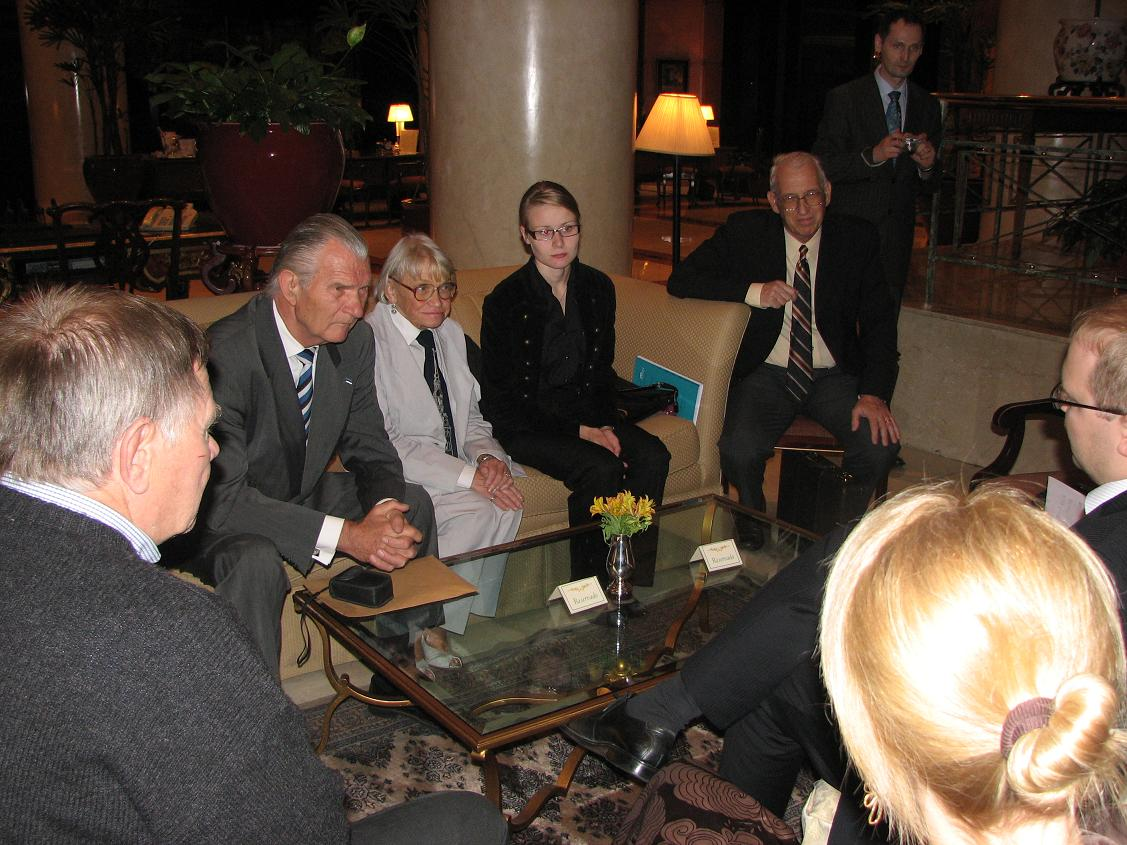
Estonian Argentines with diplomats from Estonia.

=== Lutheran Church ===
Estonians, like other immigrants from northern Europe (as the Germans, Danes, Norwegians, Swedes, Finns, Latvians, etc.) brought with them to Argentina their Lutheran religion.

The Estonian community led to the Evangelical Lutheran Congregation "The Reformation" (Spanish: La Reforma) over 55 years ago. In the church, which belongs to the United Evangelical Lutheran Church in Argentina and Uruguay, masses were offered in Estonian. In its 50th anniversary an exhibition of paintings, books and other items that evoke the Estonian cultural tradition was performed. The church is located in Olivos, Vicente López, meters from the presidential residence on 1100 Malaver Street. On October 13, 1970 a public worship was held in the Temple with the German Congregation; this marked the beginning of the Parish Community Centre of Olivos. The service was held in three languages: Estonian, German, and Spanish. It was expected that Spanish was a factor of unity among the churches.

== See also ==
- Immigration to Argentina
- Argentines of European descent
- Finnish Argentines
- Russian Argentines
- Lithuanian Argentines
