= Albanians in South America =

Albanians in South America Shqiptarët në Ameriken e jugut
Total population
- ca. 80,000 - 100,000

Regions with significant populations
- Argentina · Brazil · Uruguay · Chile

Languages
- Spanish, Portuguese, Albanian, Italian

Religion
- Majority Christianity; Minority Islam or irreligious

Related ethnic groups
- Italian diaspora, Albanian diaspora

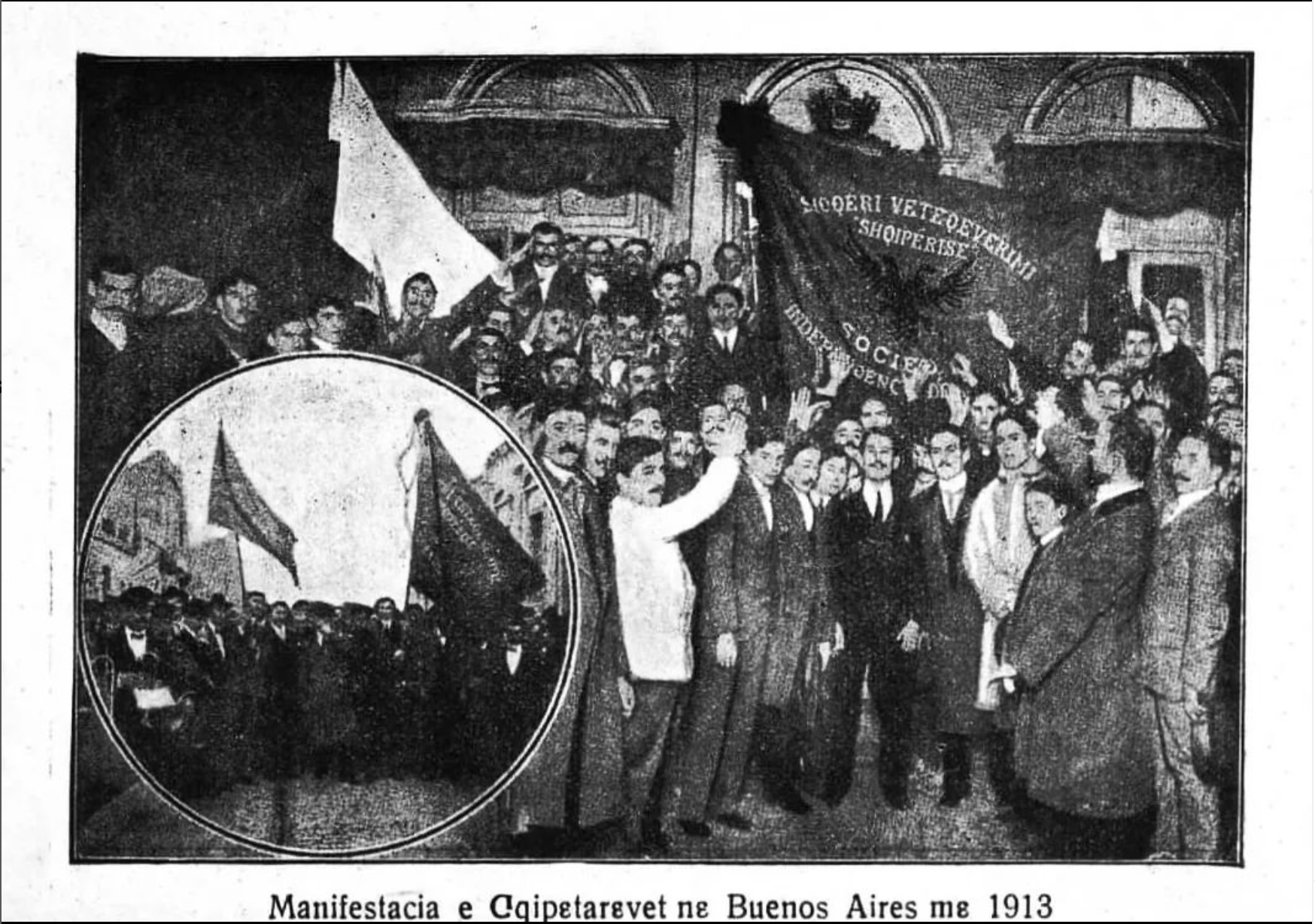
Albanians celebrating independence from Ottoman Turkey, Buenos Aires, 1913

The Albanians in South America (Albanian: Shqiptarët në Ameriken e Jugut, Italian: Albanesi in Sud America, Spanish: Albaneses en América del Sur, Portuguese: Albaneses na América do Sul) are people of Albanian ancestry and heritage in such South America states as Argentina, Brazil, Chile and Uruguay. They trace their ancestry to the territories with a large Albanian population in Italy; as for the result, many Albanians in South America tend to also identify themselves with the larger Italian community in South America. They are adherents of different religions and are predominantly Christians, with significant minorities of Muslims as well as Irreligious.

== Argentina ==
During the great immigration from South Italians towards Argentina, there were also a lot of Arbershe people. They became part of the great European immigration towards South America in the 19th century. Most Albanians who migrated to Argentina were Arbëresh from southern Italy, while the rise of Albanian exiles in Argentina occurred in the early 20th century, with the arrival of about 20,000-30,000 Albanians, many went on to be mixed with Italians and locals and thus, were no longer able to speak Albanian.

Today, apart from some families in Rosario and Córdoba, almost all Albanians of Argentina live in Buenos Aires. Every year, on 28 November, the Albanian Patriotic Society of Skanderbeg (Asociación Patriotica Albanesa Skenderbeu) celebrates the Flag Day with traditional Albanian songs and foods.

According to religion, most Albanians in Argentina are Christians, while a minority are Muslims.

== Chile ==
Albanians in Chile are active with cultural events. There are circa. 60,000 Arbereshe who have emigrated due to the high unemployment at that time in Italy.
