= Finnish Argentines =

Argentine people of Finnish ancestry

Finnish Argentine Finlandés-argentino, Argentiinansuomalaiset
- (Finland) (Argentina)

Regions with significant populations
- Misiones Province · Buenos Aires

Languages
- Rioplatense Spanish · Finnish

Related ethnic groups
- Finnish Brazilians · Estonian Argentines · other European Argentines

Finnish Argentines are Argentine citizens of full, partial, or predominantly Finnish ancestry, or Finnish-born people residing in Argentina.

Finnish emigration to Argentina began in the early twentieth century and was not as massive as those of other European nationalities. Currently, most of the descendants of Finnish immigrants live in the city of Oberá, Misiones.

== The arrival ==
The first Finnish immigrants who arrived relatively organized to Argentina, arrived in the country in 1906 and founded the "Colonia Finlandesa" (Finnish Settlement) near the city of Oberá. It was estimated that there were about 120 families. One of the pioneers of this wave was Arthur Thesleff. The reasons for the Finnish emigration seem to have been related to the repressive context that the country was in the early twentieth century because of the Russian occupation of the territory.

=== Oberá ===
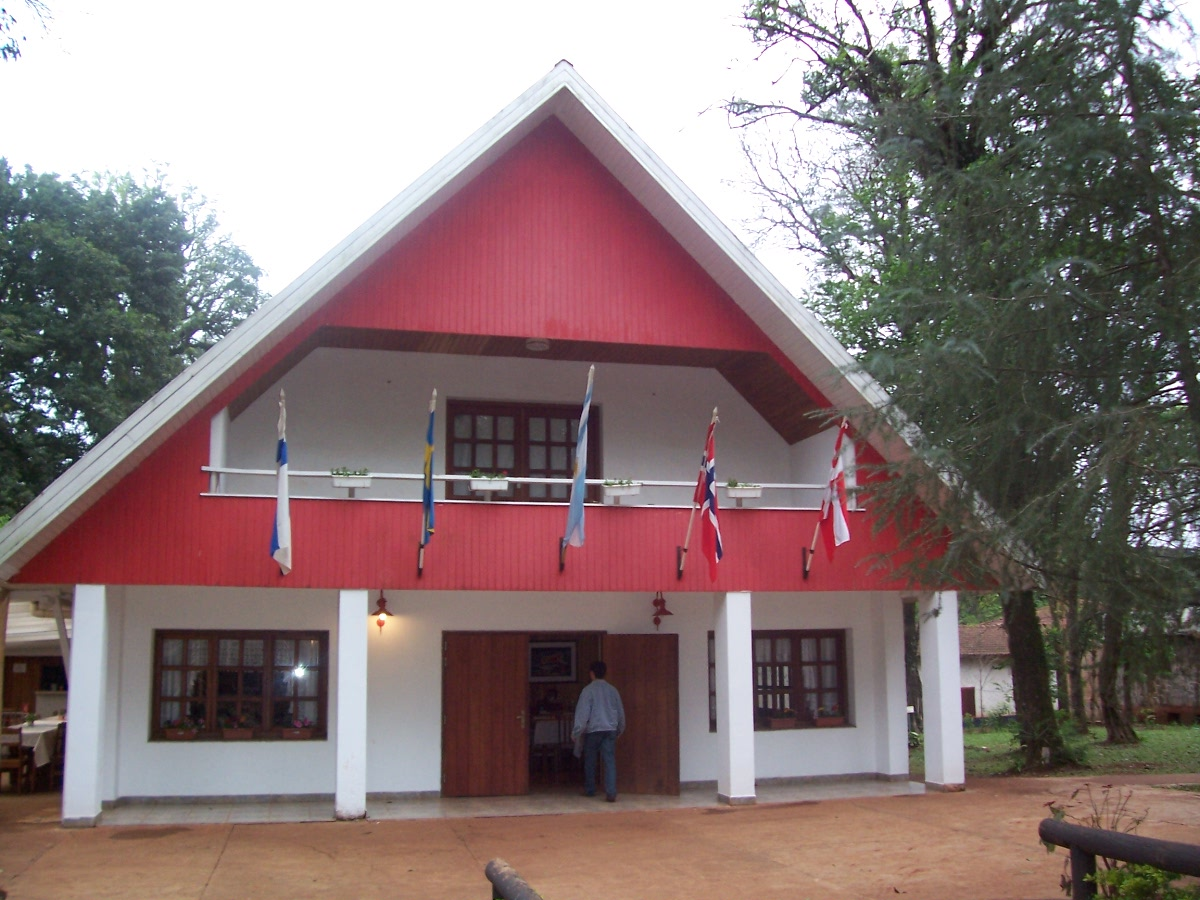
The Nordic House in Oberá, Misiones. Home to the Finnish · Swedish · Norwegian and Danish communities.

The Finns were one of the first foreign communities to settle in what is now the city of Oberá. At first, they called "Picada Finlandesa" to the three sections that were pooled city lots. This was because most of its inhabitants had come from Finland.

=== Other areas where they settled ===
Besides Misiones, Finnish immigrant groups and their descendants settled in regions of the provinces of Corrientes, Córdoba and Buenos Aires.

== Gastronomic traditions ==
In their adaptation and integration into Argentina, Finnish immigrants-like the Swedes and Norwegians, continued with some of its gastronomic traditions. The Finns who settled in Misiones, continued the habit of cooking fish (particularly surubí) and its tradition of homemade biscuits with spices like cinnamon and cloves.

== Notable people ==
- Virpi Niemelä, Finnish-born Argentine astronomer

== See also ==
- Argentina–Finland relations
- Argentines of European descent
- Swedish Argentines
- Latin American migration to Finland
