= Virpi Niemelä =

Finnish-Argentine astronomer (1936–2006)

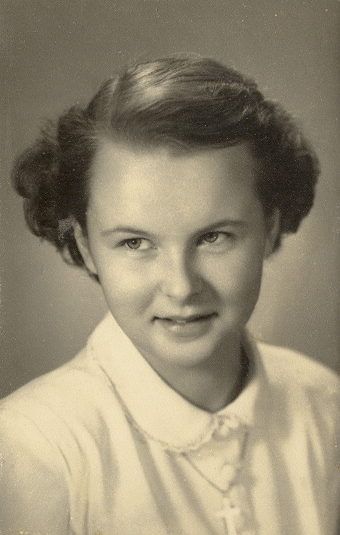
Virpi Sinikka Niemelä

Virpi Sinikka Niemelä (26 December 1936 in Helsinki – 18 December 2006 in Argentina) was a leading Finnish Argentine astronomer. She was the second Argentine to be elected for Associate of the Royal Astronomical Society.

Born in Finland, she emigrated with her family to Argentina in 1954 where she lived for the majority of her life. She became a citizen, married and had two sons.

== Education ==
She started university at the National University of La Plata to study chemistry, but decided on astronomy through the then Astronomy and Geophysics School. She received her doctorate for research done under Jorge Sahade, with whom she collaborated throughout her career.

== Career ==
Her work has had a strong influence in the areas of massive stars and close binaries, especially Wolf-Rayet stars. She pioneered work on Wolf-Rayet stars in the Magellanic Clouds, massive stars in stellar associations and interstellar bubbles around massive stars. This work was done to determine the stellar masses in binary systems and discovered and analyzed the spectroscopic orbits of many binary systems with WR components. This was achieved using data from CASLEO and analyzed the star winds and their interaction with the quasi-stellar medium. She also helped to develop astronomy in Argentina, inspiring many students. After receiving her PhD, she starting working at the National University of La Plata and became a fellow of CONICET. Despite being fired shortly after, she continued her research projects until she started working at the Comisión de Investigaciones Cientifícas de la Provincia de Buenos Aires (CICBA), where she worked until her death. She also worked for the Instituto de Astrofísica del Espacio (IAFE) in Buenos Aires as part its research staff. There, she supervised students for about a decade. She then took at appointment as professor at the Facultad de Ciencias Astronómicas y Geofísicas, where she earned her MSc and PhD. The university named her as Emeritus Professor in 2005 to acknowledge her work as researcher. From 1997 to 2001 she was also a member of the editorial committee for the Mexican Journal of Astronomy and Astrophysics.

== Legacy and organisational affiliations ==
She also played an important role in women's rights within the scientific research community, pushing to include maternity leave for postgraduate students with research council grants and pointing out cases where gender segregation was influencing job offers.

She became the vice president of the Argentinian Astronomy Association from 1993 until 1996. In 1998, was awarded the Carlos Varsavsky prize for her contribution to Argentine astronomy by the National Academy of Exact, Physical, and Natural Sciences of Buenos Aires. Two years later, they appointed her as a member, as the second female member in the history of the academy. In 2003, she was also the first female awarded the Platinum Prize in Astronomy by the Fundación Konex Argentina. To mark her seventieth birthday, an international workshop on massive stars was held in Carilo on 11–14 December 2006. During the workshop, it was announced that asteroid 5289 would be named Niemela in her honor and that she was elected as and Associate of the Royal Astronomical Society. However, she died just before her birthday, of breast cancer.
