= Serbs in South America =

Ethnic Serb communities in South America

Country	Population
Argentina	~5,000
Venezuela	<1,000

There are several Serb communities in South America, notably in Argentina and Venezuela. These communities conist mostly of people with partial and distant Serb ancestry i.e. third- or fourth-generation of immigrants.

== Notable people ==
- Miguel Avramovic (born 1981), Argentinian footballer, paternal Serb descent
- Gastón Bojanich (born 1985), Argentinian footballer
- Marcelo Burzac (born 1988), Argentinian footballer
- Jorge Capitanich (born 1964), Argentinian politician
- Gloria Ana Chevesich (born 1958), Chilean judge, paternal Serb descent
- Eleodoro Damianovich (1843–1925), Argentine doctor
- Andrea Jeftanovic (born 1970), Chilean sociologist and author, paternal Serb descent
- Blagoje Jovović (1922–1999), Chetnik guerilla fighter
- Sergio Mihanovich (1937–2012), Argentine jazz musician, maternal Serb descent
- Emilio Ogñénovich (1923–2011), Catholic archbishop of Mercedes-Luján, Argentine, paternal Serb descent
- Claudia Pavlovich Arellano (born 1969), Chilean politician, paternal Serb descent
- Miguel Socolovich (born 1986), Venezuelan baseball player
- Milan Stojadinović (1888–1961), Serbian politician
- Lyanco (born 1997), Brazilian footballer, paternal Serb descent
- Miloš Vukasović/Miguel Vucassovich (1842–1908), shipbuilder
- Paola Vukojicic (born 1974), Argentine field hockey player
- Geraldine Zivic (born 1975), Argentine-born Colombian actress, paternal Serb descent

== See also ==
- Serbian Argentines
- Serbian Venezuelans
- Serbian Orthodox Eparchy of Buenos Aires, South America, and Central America

== Sources ==
- Mozzart Sport (26 April 2013). "SRPSKI SINOVI: Orlovi iz Južne Amerike (VIDEO)". Mozzart Sport.
