= Serbian Argentines =

Argentinos Serbios Аргентински Срби Argentinski Srbi

Total population
- ~5,000 (est.)

Regions with significant populations
- Buenos Aires, Chaco, and Santa Fe

Languages
- Argentine Spanish

Religion
- Predominately Catholicism, minority Eastern Orthodoxy (Serbian Orthodox Church)

Related ethnic groups
- Montenegrin Argentines, Croatian Argentines, Slovene Argentines, Bulgarian Argentines, Macedonian Argentines

Serbian Argentines or Serb Argentines are Argentine citizens of ethnic Serb descent, mostly with partial or distant Serb ancestry, i.e. third- or fourth-generation of immigrants.

== History ==
Serbs began to settle in South America in mid-19th century. These were primarily sailors from the Bay of Kotor and Dalmatia who sailed on ships under various flags. One of the sailors from the Bay of Kotor who settled in Argentina was Miloš Vukasović. In 1870, he opened the steamship company "La Platense" in Buenos Aires. Later, Vukasović was appointed honorary consul of the Principality of Montenegro in Argentina and was also the honorary president of the Slavic Mutual Aid Society, which was founded in 1880 in Buenos Aires by South Slavic emigrants, while the secretary of the society was his brother Božo Vukasović.

In the period up to 1908, among millions of people who immigrated to Argentina, there were 21 Serbs from the Kingdom of Serbia, about 300 Serbs from the Principality of Montenegro, and as many as 500 Serbs from Austria-Hungary. Among the prominent and older emigrants from Montenegro were the Radonjić family, which originated from Njeguši. The Radonjićs came to Buenos Aires in 1870, and the first among them to establish themselves was Dušan Radonjić, who became a prominent businessman and director of the newspaper "El economista". He was the son-in-law of Milan Stojadinović. Dušan Radonjić's son, Juan Radonjić, was a famous Argentine politician, and his daughter, Vanessa Radonjić, became the 1986 Miss Argentine. Among other notable immigrants, there was Dragomir Kostić the founder of the Serbian Orthodox Church community in Argentina.

In 1886, the Argentine state awarded a Serb from Bay of Kotor, Jovo Vukasović, captain of the French ship "Minerva", a gold medal for his services. On this occasion, the Industrial Club organized a ceremony for him in the theater, where a eulogy was given by Dr. Moret. The Serbian tricolor fluttered in the local Slavic Reading Room. The poet Niko Abramović published a poem dedicated to Vukasović in a local newspaper.

In 1905, the Belgrade newspaper listed the then Serb millionaires in Argentina. Among them, M. Mihanović, a Serb from bay of Kotor, was a shipowner in Buenos Aires, and at the same time an honorary consul of Austria-Hungary. Marko Vukasović, a Serb from Dalmatia, was also a shipowner and his capital was estimated at 50 million dollars at the time. His large ocean-going ships maintained traffic between Argentina and Spain. Professor Rafajlović, Vojvodina native was a professor of classical philology at the University of Buenos Aires.

After the World War II, certain members of the royalist Chetnik movement fleeing political persecution by the Communist regime of Josip Broz Tito, settled in Argentina. Among them was Blagoje Jovović who built a successful hotel business in Argentina and, in 1957 in Buenos Aires, carried out a notorious assassination attempt on Ante Pavelić, the Croatian fascist Ustaše leader responsible for wartime atrocities against Serbs, shooting him twice and mortally wounding him. In recognition of his actions, a Belgrade street was named after him in 2020.

In 2011, the Serbian Orthodox Eparchy of Buenos Aires and South America was established with its headquarters in Buenos Aires.

== Demographics ==
Approximately 5,000 Argentines of Serb descent live in Argentina, originating from the territories of today’s Montenegro (Bay of Kotor) and Croatia (Dalmatia), and, to a much lesser extent, from Serbia and Bosnia and Herzegovina. They live mostly in the provinces Buenos Aires, Chaco, and Santa Fe.

The research on Serb diaspora in Argentina, conducted by Ethnographic Institute of the Serbian Academy of Sciences and Arts, had several conclusions. First, that this community is bounded to its ethnic origin, even though they are assimilated. Secondly, they consider themselves both as an integral part of Serb people and Argentines, although they are frequently unable to clearly define their ethnic identity, and thus a great number of them use the term “our” to refer to their origin, language, culture, and community. Thirdly, only a very small fraction of immigrant descendants use Serbian language.

Some of homeland clubs, founded by first generations of immigrants in late 19th and early 20th century are still active and represent places where some of their descendants gather. It is important to mention that Serbian Orthodox Eparchy of Buenos Aires and South America also plays important role in this community, serving as their connection with the ethnic and cultural heritage.

== Notable people ==
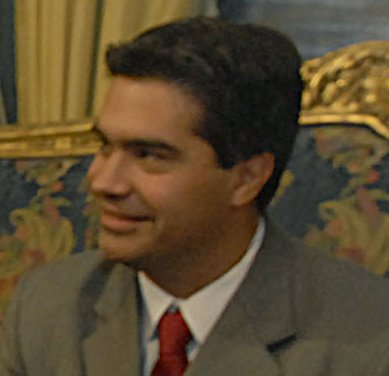
Jorge Capitanich

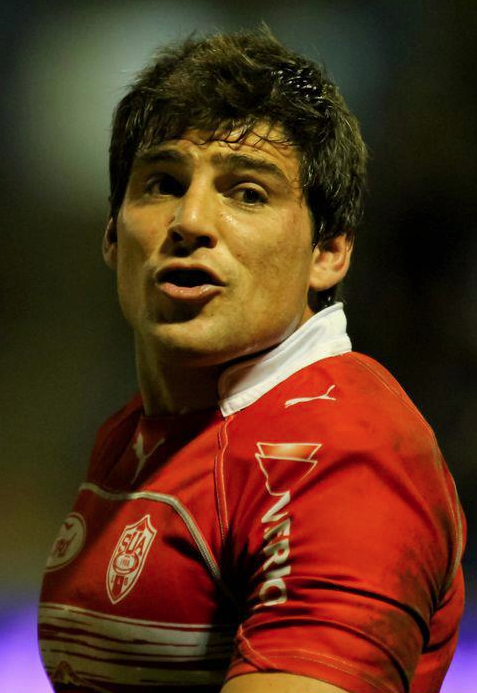
Miguel Avramovic

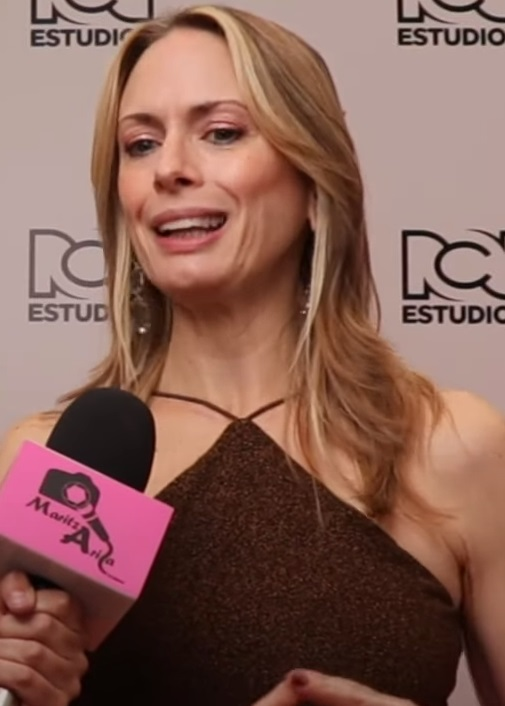
Geraldine Zivic

- Miguel Avramovic – rugby union player, paternal Serb descent
- Marcelo Burzac – football player, paternal Serb descent
- Jorge Capitanich – politician
- Blagoje Jovović – assassin, emigrated to Argentina in the 1940s
- Sergio Mihanovich – musician, maternal Serb descent
- Nicolás Pavlovich – football player, paternal Serb descent
- Milan Stojadinović – politician, emigrated to Argentina in the 1940s
- Horacio Tijanovich – football player, paternal Serb descent
- Paola Vukojicic – field hockey player, paternal Serb descent
- Geraldine Zivic – actress, paternal Serb descent

== See also ==
- Immigration to Argentina
- Argentines of European descent
- Serb diaspora
- Argentina–Serbia relations
- Serbian Orthodox Eparchy of Buenos Aires, South America, and Central America
