= Argentines =

People of Argentina

Argentinos (Spanish)

Total population
- c. 45.5 million

Regions with significant populations
- Argentina 44,385,188 (2025) (Note: RENAPER (Registro Nacional de las Personas) estimates Argentina's population at 46,735,004 inhabitants in 2025, of whom 2,349,816 are immigrants (excluding their children).)

Diaspora
- Spain: 450,883
- United States: 365,479
- Chile: 83,265 (2023)
- Brazil: 78,350 (2025)
- Paraguay: 58,535
- Israel: 48,312
- Bolivia: 46,609
- Canada: 23,500
- Uruguay: 22,743
- Italy: 18,104
- France: 17,999–25,040 (2024)
- Germany: 17,141
- Australia: 14,190
- Peru: 11,444
- Mexico: 10,214
- United Kingdom: 10,200
- Venezuela: 9,740
- Switzerland: 9,391
- Sweden: 4,502
- Japan: 3,762
- South Africa: 3,000
- Belgium: 3,000
- Austria: 2,000
- Netherlands: 2,189
- Denmark: 1,046
- New Zealand: 1,824
- Puerto Rico: 1,431

Languages
- Majority: Spanish (Rioplatense Spanish · Cordoban Spanish · Cuyo Spanish · Andean Spanish); Minority: Italian (Argentine Italian); Catalan (Argentine Catalan); Guarani (Chiripá Guaraní · Mbyá Guaraní · Chawuncu Guaraní); German (Argentinien-schwyzertütsch · Riograndese Hunsrik · Plautdietsch); Welsh (Patagonian Welsh); Quechua (Santiagueño Quechua); Afrikaans (Patagonian Afrikaans)

Religion
- Predominantly Christianity (mainly Latin Catholicism)

Related ethnic groups
- Uruguayans; Southern Brazilians; Southeastern Brazilians; Other South Americans

Argentines, also known as Argentinians or Argentineans, are people associated with Argentina. These ties may be legal, historical, ancestral, or cultural. For most Argentines, several of these connections exist and are collectively the source of their Argentine identity.

Argentina is a multiethnic society, home to people of various ethnic, racial, religious, denomination, and national origins, with the majority of the population made up of Old World immigrants and their descendants. As a result, Argentines do not equate their nationality with ethnicity, but with citizenship and allegiance to Argentina. Aside from the indigenous population, nearly all Argentines or their ancestors immigrated within the past five centuries. Among countries in the world that have received the most immigrants in modern history, Argentina, with 6.6 million, ranks second to the United States (27 million), and ahead of other immigrant destinations such as Canada, Brazil, and Australia.

It is estimated that between 79.4% to 85% of Argentina's population are whites (predominantly European or Levantine ancestry), while mestizos (mixed European and Amerindian ancestry without predominance) constitute between 10.7% to 16.3%; according to the 2022 census, indigenous (predominantly Amerindian ancestry) make up 2.8%, while blacks account 0.7% (predominantly African ancestry). Regardless of predominant ancestry, it is estimated that between 30% and 56% of Argentines have at least one Amerindian ancestor, and between 4% and 6% have at least one African ancestor.

== Ethnic groups ==
=== Overview ===
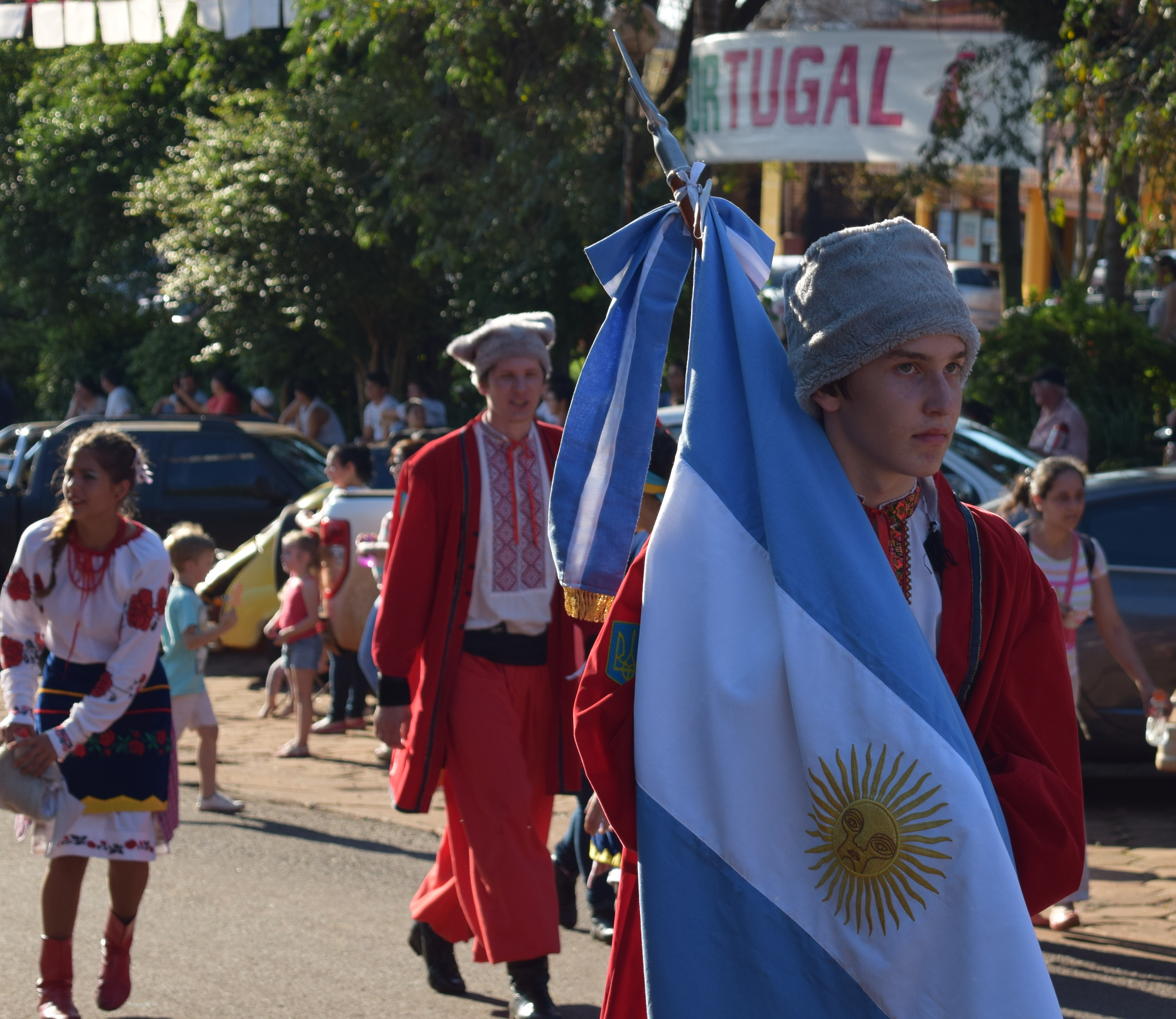
Argentines during the opening parade of the XXXIV Immigrant's Festival in Oberá, Misiones.

Argentina is a multiethnic society, which means that it is home to people of many different ethnic, racial, religious, and denominational backgrounds. Argentina is a melting pot of different peoples.

In the mid-19th century a large wave of immigration started to arrive in Argentina due to new Constitutional policies that encouraged immigration, and issues in the countries the immigrants came from, such as wars, poverty, hunger, and famines. The main immigration sources were from Europe, the countries from the Near and the Middle East, Russia, and Japan. Eventually, Argentina became the country with the second-largest number of immigrants in the period, with 6.6 million, second only to the United States with 27 million.

Therefore, most Argentines have some European ancestry (with a significant indigenous component, and a less prominent black component), and are either descendants of colonial-era settlers and/or of the 19th and 20th century immigrants from Europe.

The most common ethnic groups are Europeans (mostly Spanish and Italian descent) and/or Mestizos (mixed European and Native American ancestry). According to Argentine government websites, it is estimated that more than 20 million Argentines, more than 46% of the total population, have Italian ancestry, wholly or in part. Argentines descend mostly from Spaniards, Italians, Native Americans and to a lesser extent from French, Germans, East Asians, and others.

Immigration of recent decades includes mainly Paraguayans, Bolivians, Peruvians, and Brazilians, among other Latin Americans, Eastern Europeans, Africans, Arabs, and Asians.

Results of the ethno-racial censuses of Argentina 1778–2022
Year	White (Europe and West Asia)		Native (The Americas)		Mestizo (Multiracial)		Mulatto (Multiracial)	Black (Sub-Sahara)		East Asian (Far East)	Total
1778	69,804	37.54%	41,517	22.33%	6,134	3.31%	68,465		36.82%		▲185,920
2001			600,329	1.66%							▲36,260,130
2010			955,032	2.38%				149,493	0.37%		▲40,117,096
2022			1,306,730	2.83%				302,936	0.66%		▲46,044,703

- In the 1778 census, mulattoes were included in the "Black" category despite having up to 50% White admixture.

=== Genetics studies ===
Genetic ancestry of the average Argentine gene pool according to Caputo et al. (2021) using X-DIPs (matrilineal).
1. Caucasian DNA (77.8%)
2. Amerindian DNA (17.9%)
3. Sub-saharan DNA (4.20%)

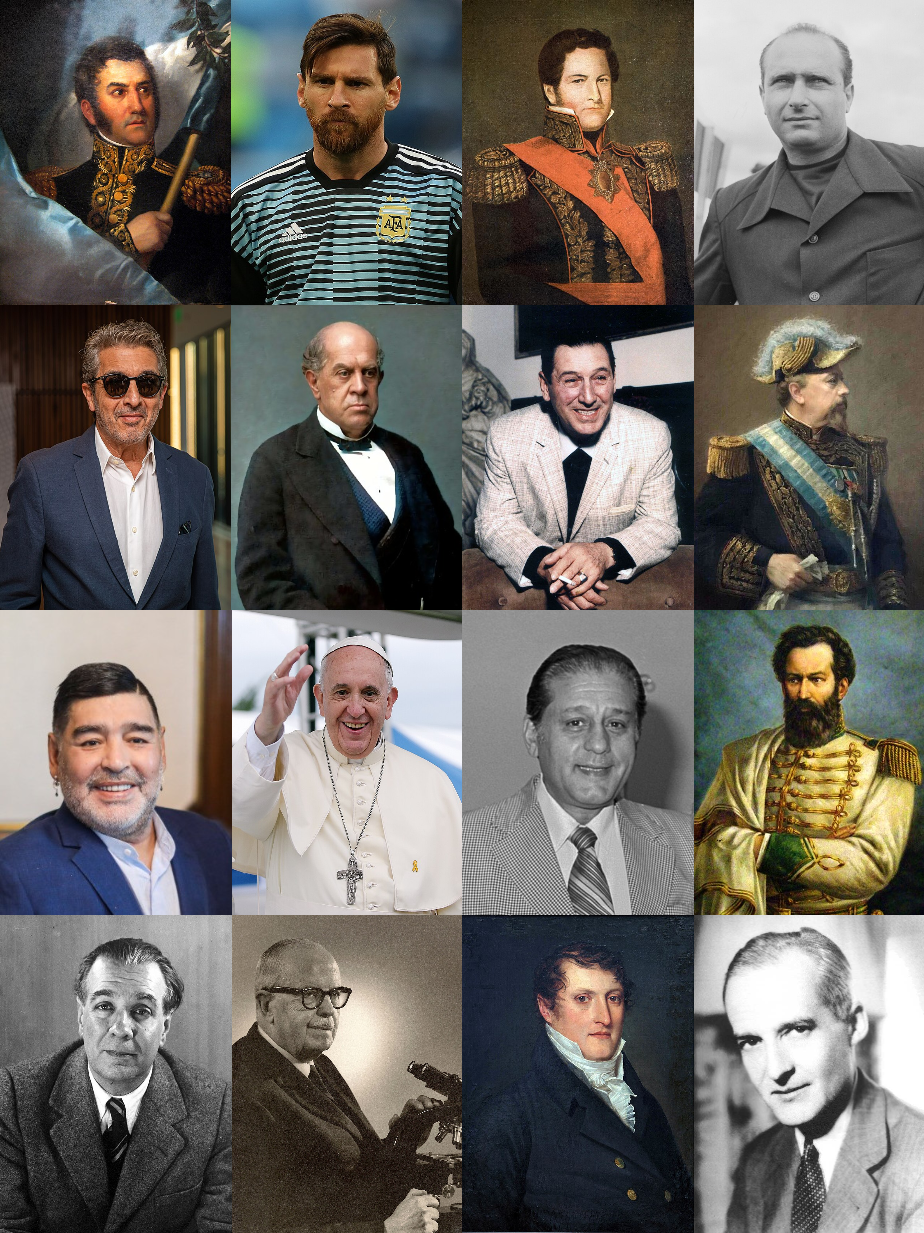
Origin of the surnames of some of the most prominent Argentines: • José de San Martín (Spanish) • Lionel Andrés Messi (Italian) • Juan Manuel de Rosas (Spanish) • Juan Manuel Fangio (Italian) • Ricardo Alberto Darín (Italian) • Domingo F. Sarmiento (Spanish) • Juan Domingo Perón (French) • Julio Argentino Roca (Spanish) • Diego Armando Maradona (Spanish) • Jorge Mario Bergoglio (Italian) • René Gerónimo Favaloro (Italian) • Martín Miguel de Güemes (Basque) • Bernardo Alberto Houssay (French) • Jorge Luis Borges (Portuguese) • Manuel Belgrano (Italian) • Luis Federico Leloir (French)

Large comprehensive studies across Argentina's many regions in order to characterize the genetic admixture have been lacking. Small sample size studies give the following composition.

- Corach et al., 2011, Genetic Structure of Argentina:, 52% Amerindian ancestry in the Center region, 56% Ameridian in the South-Southwest y 66% Amerindian in the North-Northeast. On average, 36.4% of the population does not have any Amerindian ancestry.
- Homburguer et al., 2015, PLOS One Genetics: 67% European, 28% Amerindian, 4% African and 1.4% Asian.
- Olivas et al., 2017, Nature: 84,1% predominantly European ancestry and 12,8% predominanty Amerindian ancestry.
- Seldin et al., 2006, American Journal of Physical Anthropology: 78.0% European, 19.4% Amerindian and 2.5% African. Using other methods it was found that it could be: 80.2% European, 18.1% Amerindian and 1.7% African.
- Genera (2022): 85% Caucasian (74% European + 11% Middle East), 13% Amerindian and 1% African.
- According to Caputo et al., 2021, The X-DIPs matrilineal show 52.9% European, 39.6% Amerindian and 7.5% African. The study of autosomal DIPs show that the genetic contribution is 77.8% European, 17.9% Amerindian and 4.2% African.
- Avena et al., 2012, PLOS One Genetics: 65% European, 31% Amerindian, and 4% African.
  - Buenos Aires Province: 76% European and 24% others.
  - South Zone (Chubut Province): 54% European and 46% others.
  - Northeast Zone (Misiones, Corrientes, Chaco & Formosa provinces): 54% European and 46% others.
  - Northwest Zone (Salta Province): 33% European and 67% others.
- Other studies indicate that the genetic composition between regions would be:
  - Central Zone: 81% European, 15% Amerindian and 4% African
  - South Zone: 68% European, 28% Amerindian and 4% African
  - Northeast Zone: 79% European, 17% Amerindian and 4% African
  - Northwest Zone: 55% European, 35% Amerindian and 10% African
- Corach et al.,. 2010, Annals of Human Genetics: 78.5% European, 17.3% Amerindian, and 4.2% African ancestry.
- Oliveira, 2008, on Universidade de Brasília: 60% European, 31% Amerindian and 9% African.
- National Geographic: 61% Caucasian (52% European + 9% Middle East/North Africa), 27% Amerindian ancestry and 9% African.

A team led by Daniel Corach conducted a study in 2010, analyzing 246 samples from eight provinces and three different regions of the country. The results were as follows: Mitochondrial DNA analysis again showed a great Amerindian contribution by maternal lineage, at 53.7%, with 44.3% of European contribution, and a 2% African contribution. The analysis of Y-Chromosome DNA revealed a 94.1% of European contribution, and only 4.9% and 0.9% of Native American and Black African contribution, respectively. The study of 24 autosomal markers also proved a large European contribution of 78.5%, against 17.3% of Amerindian and 4.2% Black African contributions.

Several studies found out that the European ancestry in Argentina comes mainly from the Iberian Peninsula and Italy with a much lower contribution from Central and Northern Europe. The Italian component appears strongest in the East and Center-West, while the Spanish influence dominates in the North East and North West.

=== European Argentines ===
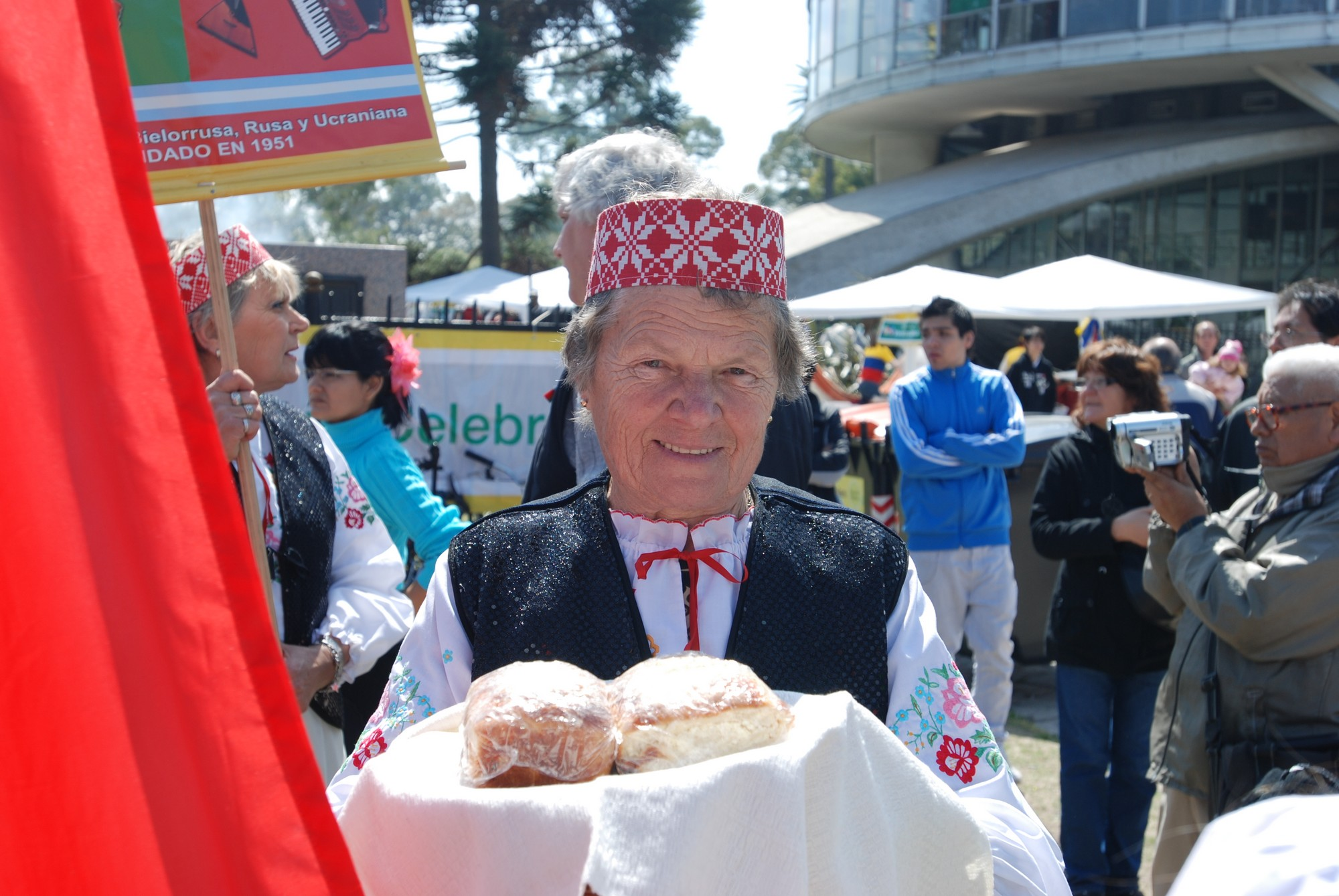
Belarusian Argentine woman during Immigrant Day festivities in Buenos Aires, 2010.

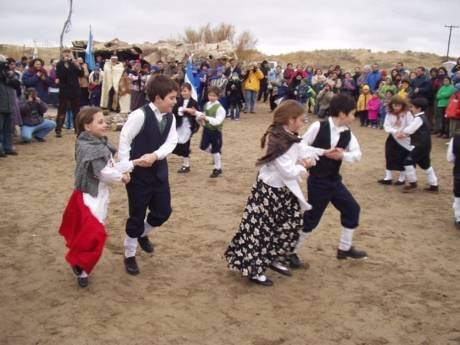
Descendants of Welsh settlers in Rawson, Chubut Province

Argentines of partial European include the Argentine descendants of colonists from Spain during the colonial period prior to 1810, and mainly of immigrants from Europe in the great immigratory wave from the mid 19th century to the mid 20th century. No recent Argentine census has included comprehensive questions on ethnicity, although numerous studies have determined that European Argentines have been a majority in the country since 1914.

The most numerous immigrant European communities are: Spaniards (including Basques, Asturians and Galicians), Italians (62.5% of the population have some degree of Italian descent), Germans, Scandinavians (mainly Danes and Swedes), Slavs (including Russians, Ukrainians, Poles, Czechs, Bulgarians, Slovenes, Serbs and Croats), Finns, the French (including francophone Basques), the Irish, Portuguese, the Dutch, among others in smaller number.

There are approximately 300,000 Romani descendants in Argentina. They belong to the Romani subgroups Greek, Moldavian and Russian Kalderash, some Lovari and some Chilean Xoraxane. There are also Spanish Kalé and Boyash living in Argentina.

=== Mixed Argentines ===
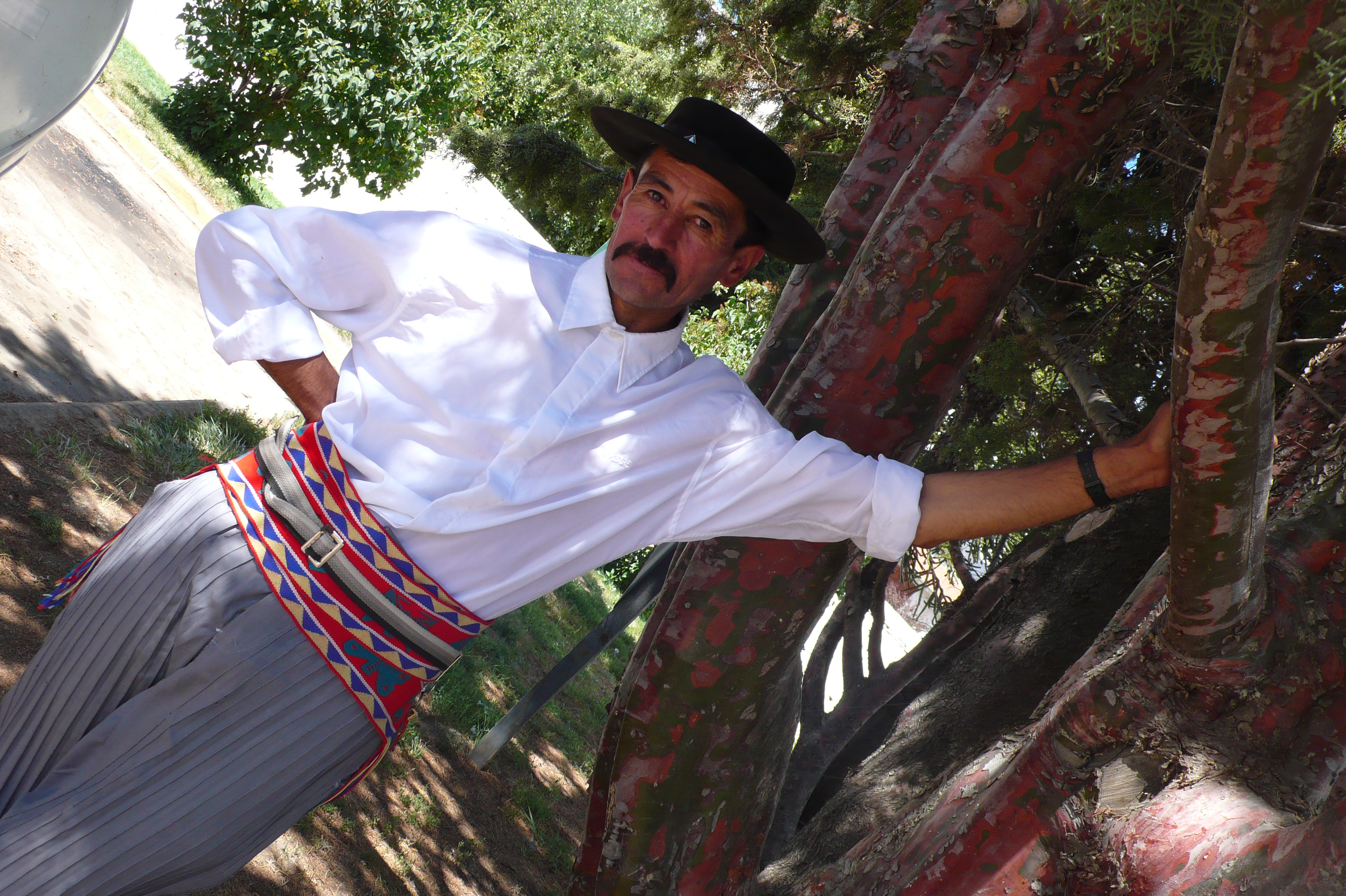
A gaucho man in Junín de los Andes, Neuquén.

Within the population totals, there may be an imprecise amount of mixed population. In one of the most comprehensive genetic studies involving the population of Argentina, 441 Argentines from across the North East, Salta, Chubut and Buenos Aires (especially the urban conglomeration of Buenos Aires) of the country, it was observed that the sample population comprised on average of 65% European, followed by 31% Amerindian, and finally 4% of African ancestry; however, this study was unweighted and meant to be a representation of the diversity of Argentine DNA rather than a demonstration of the average ethnic composition of the country. It was also found there were great differences in the ancestry amongst Argentines as one traveled across the country. A study by Daniel Corach that attempted to find the average Argentine ancestry by weighing the population of various regions gave a significantly higher estimate of European ancestry at 78.5% of the average Argentine's autosomal DNA.

=== Indigenous Argentines ===
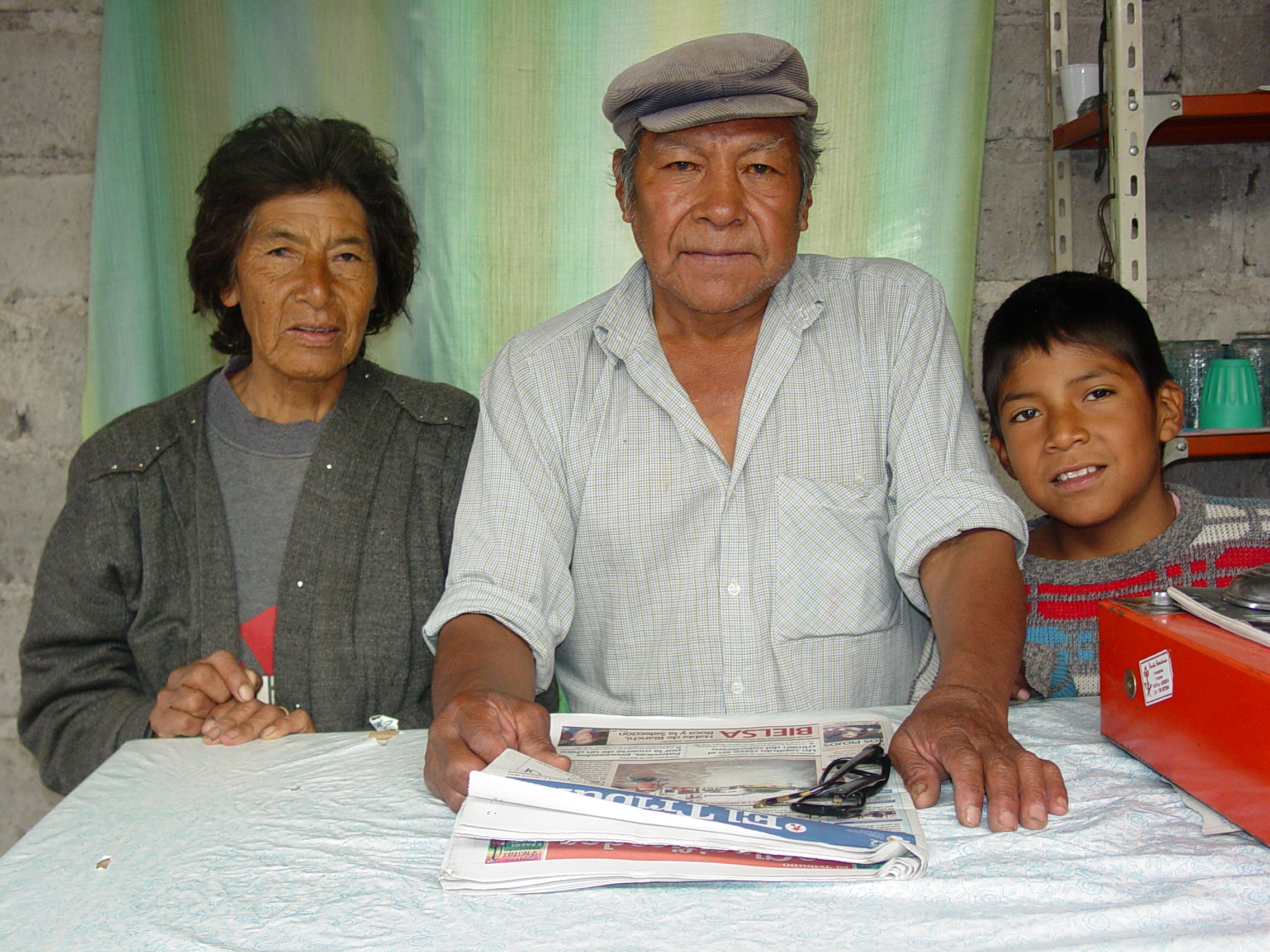
Family in Cachi, Salta Province

Argentina has 35 officially recognized indigenous people groups. As of the 2010 census [INDEC], some 955,032 Argentines (2.38% of the country's population) self-identify as indigenous or first-generation descendants of indigenous peoples.

The most populous indigenous groups were the Aonikenk, Kolla, Qom, Wichí, Diaguita, Mocoví, Huarpe peoples, Mapuche and Guarani Many Argentines also identify as having at least one indigenous ancestor; a genetic study conducted by the University of Buenos Aires in 2011 showed that 56% of the 320 Argentines sampled were shown to have at least one indigenous ancestor in one parental lineage and around 11% had indigenous ancestors in both parental lineages. Other studies suggest that figure could be 30%.

Jujuy Province, in the Argentine Northwest, is home to the highest percentage of households (15%) with at least one indigenous resident or a direct descendant of an indigenous person; Chubut and Neuquén Provinces, in Patagonia, have upwards of 12%.

=== Asian Argentines ===
Argentines of Asian ancestry are defined as either born within Argentina, or born elsewhere and later to become a citizen or resident of Argentina. Asian Argentines settled in Argentina in large numbers during several waves of immigration in the 19th and 20th centuries. In the 19th century, West Asian immigrants, primarily from Lebanon and Syria came as a result of the 1860 Mount Lebanon civil war. In the early 20th century, a small wave of East Asian immigrants, particularly from Japan came to the country.

==== East Asians Argentines ====
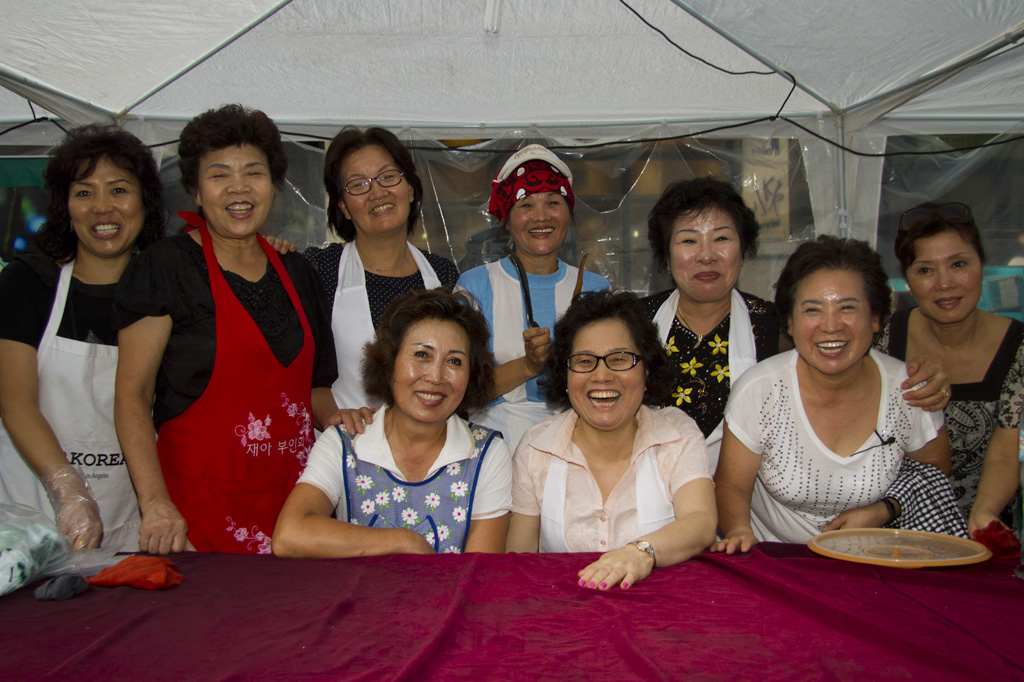
East Asian Argentines at the Korean stand of the 2012 Gastronomic Patio held in Buenos Aires.

The first Argentines of East Asian descent were a small group of Japanese immigrants, mainly from the Okinawa prefecture, which came in the period between the early and mid 20th century. In the 1960s, Koreans began to arrive, and in the 1980s, Taiwanese immigrants. The 1990s brought the largest wave of Asian immigration so far to Argentina, from mainland Chinese immigrants, eventually becoming the fourth largest immigrant community in 2013, after Paraguayans, Bolivians, and Peruvians. The small East Asian Argentine population has generally kept a low profile, and is accepted by greater Argentine society. Primarily living in their own neighbourhoods in Buenos Aires, many currently own their own businesses of varying sizes – largely textiles, grocery stores, and buffet-style restaurants.

==== West Asian Argentines ====
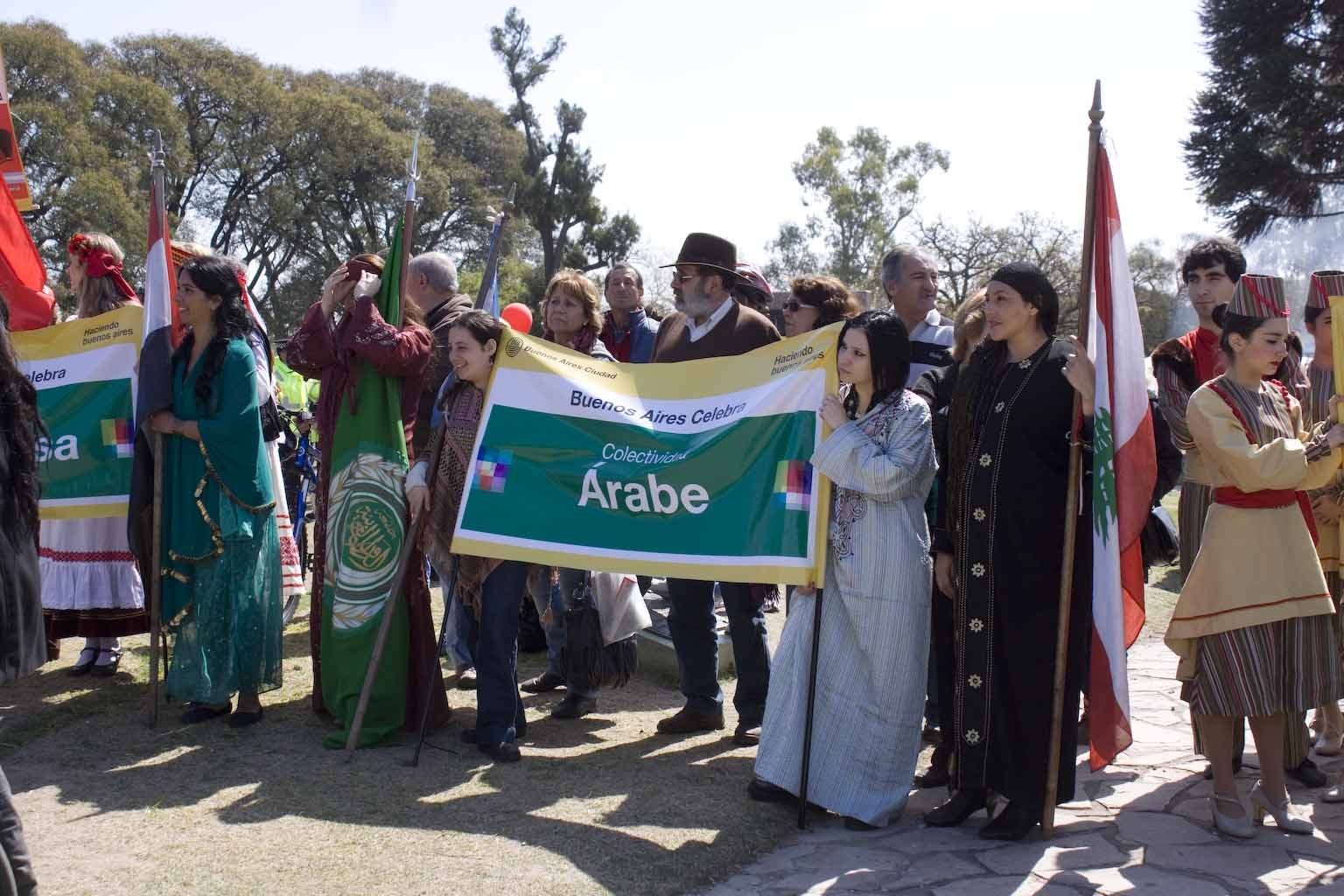
Arab-Argentines during the Day of the immigrants in Buenos Aires.

Arabs and Argentines with partial Arab ancestry represent about 3.2 million people, whose ancestry traces back to any of various waves of immigrants, largely from the Levantine region of Western Asia, from what is now Syria and Lebanon; and from Cilicia and Palestine in a lesser extent. Due to the fact that many Arab countries were under control of the Ottoman Empire by the time the large immigration wave took place, most Arabs entered the country with Turkish passports, and so they are colloquially referred to as los turcos.

There are also 80,000 to 135,000 descendants of Armenians in Argentina, most of them in Buenos Aires, representing one of the largest Armenian diasporas in the world.

=== Black Argentines ===
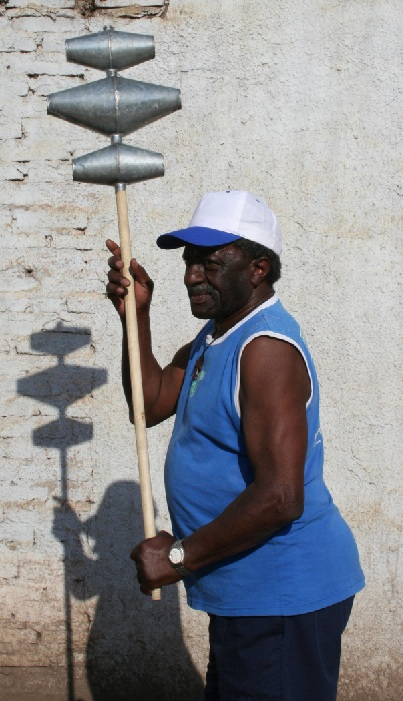
Afro-Argentine man in Merlo with a masacalla, used for Argentine candombe.

According to the Argentine national census of 2010, 149,493 (0.37% of the country's overall population) identified as Afro-Argentine, although according to gene pools studies, the Argentine population with some degree of Sub-Saharan African descent would be around 7.5%. World Bank and Argentine government estimates have suggested the Argentine population with at least some African ancestry could number over 2 million, or between 4% and 6% of the population.

Despite the fact that in the 1960s it was calculated that Argentina owed two thirds of the volume of its population to European immigration, over 5% of Argentines state they have at least one black ancestor, and a further 20% state they do not know whether or not they have any black ancestors. Genetic studies carried out in 2005 showed that the average level of African genetic contribution in the population of Buenos Aires is 2.2%, but that this component is concentrated in 10% of the population who display notably higher levels of African ancestry. Today there is still a notable Afro-Argentine community in the Buenos Aires districts of San Telmo and La Boca. There are also quite a few African-descended Argentines in Merlo and Ciudad Evita, in the Buenos Aires metropolitan area.

Immigration from Cape Verde was one of the earliest African migratory flows in the post-colonial era, beginning as early as the late 19th century and well into the 20th century. Today, Cape Verdeans constitute one of the largest African immigrant communities, numbering over 15,000; they mainly live in port cities in Buenos Aires Province, such as Ensenada and Dock Sud. Immigration from Senegal, Nigeria, Sierra Leone, Angola and other African countries in recent decades has caused a surge in the country's black population as well.

== Languages ==
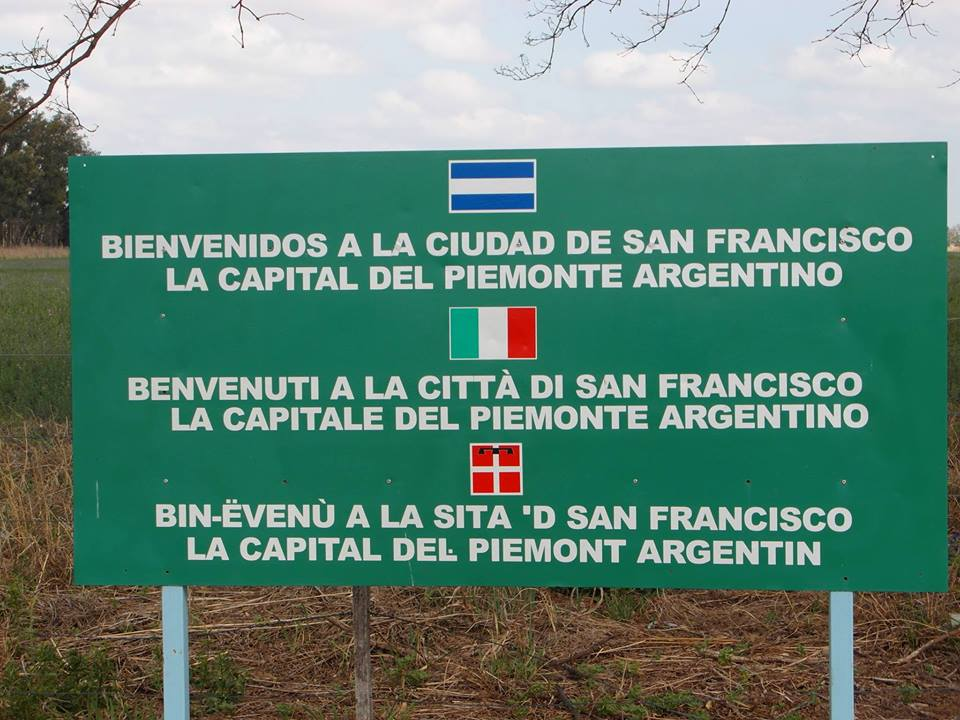
Sign in San Francisco, Córdoba, in Spanish, Italian and Piedmontese, reading: "Welcome to the city of San Francisco, the capital of the Argentine Piedmont".

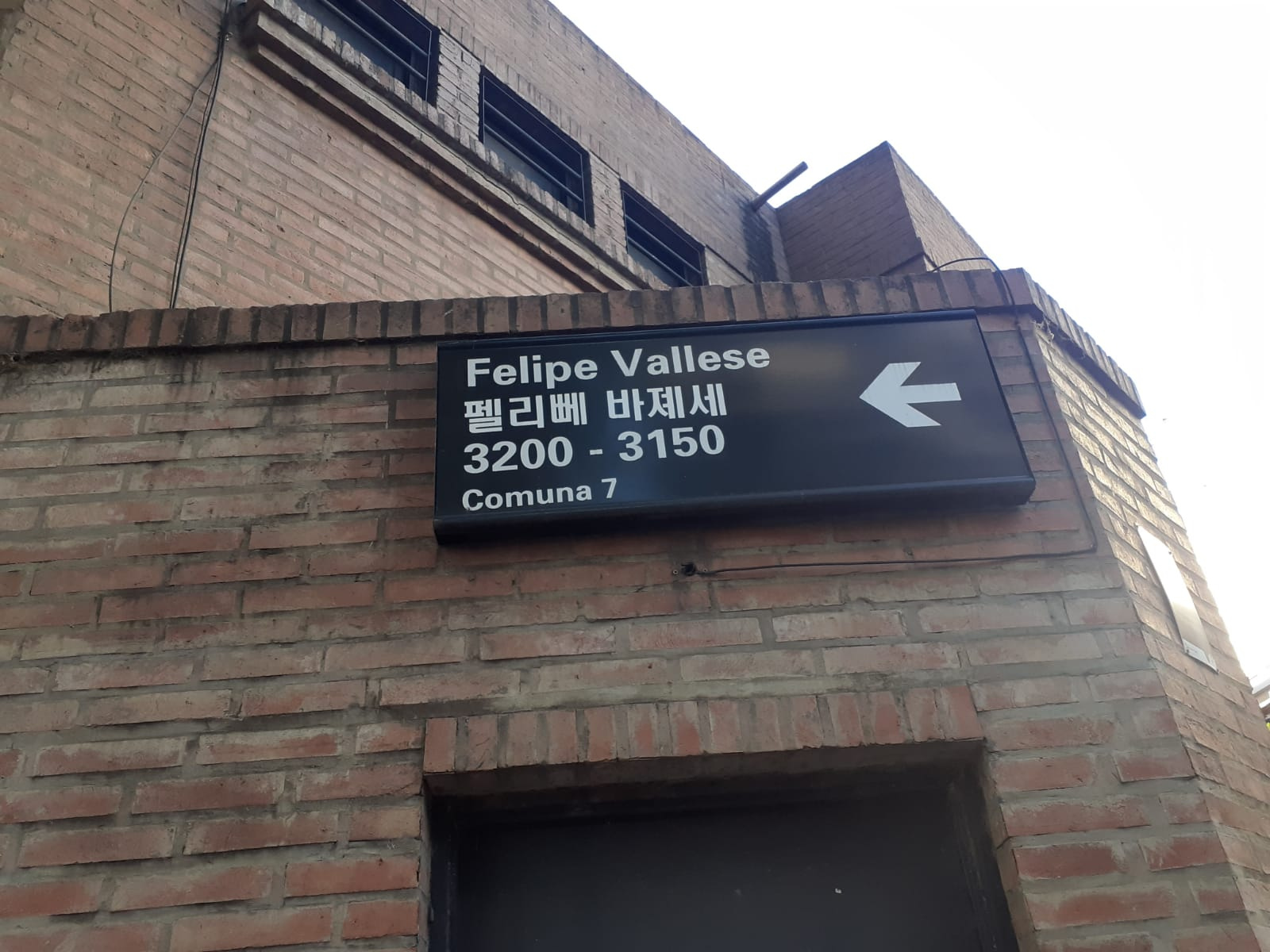
Sign in Buenos Aires in Spanish and Korean, reading the street name and the Korean phonetic transliteration.

Although Spanish is dominant, being the national language spoken by virtually all Argentines, at least 40 languages are spoken in Argentina. Languages spoken by at least 100,000 Argentines include Amerindian languages such as Southern Quechua, Guaraní and Mapudungun, and immigrant languages such as German, Italian, English, French or Levantine Arabic.

Two native languages are extinct (Abipón and Chané), while some others are endangered, spoken by elderly people whose descendants do not speak the languages (such as Vilela, Puelche, Tehuelche and Selkʼnam).

There are also other communities of immigrants that speak their native languages, such as the Chinese language spoken by at least half of the over 60,000 Chinese immigrants (mostly in Buenos Aires) and an Occitan-speaking community in Pigüé, Buenos Aires Province. Welsh is also spoken by over 35,000 people in the Chubut Province. This includes a dialect called Patagonian Welsh, which has developed since the start of the Welsh settlement in Argentina in 1865.

A high percentage of Argentines are proficient in the English language since its teaching is included in educational establishments as early as kindergarten. According to the 2023 edition of the English Proficiency Index, Argentines have the highest level of English proficiency in Latin America, ranking 28th worldwide.

== Religion ==
Religion in Argentina (2022)
1. Catholicism (67.8%)
2. Evangelicalism (6.30%)
3. Mormonism (0.90%)
4. Irreligion (16.8%)
5. Islam (1.50%)
6. Buddhism (0.50%)
7. Judaism (0.40%)
8. Hinduism (0.10%)
9. Others (5.70%)

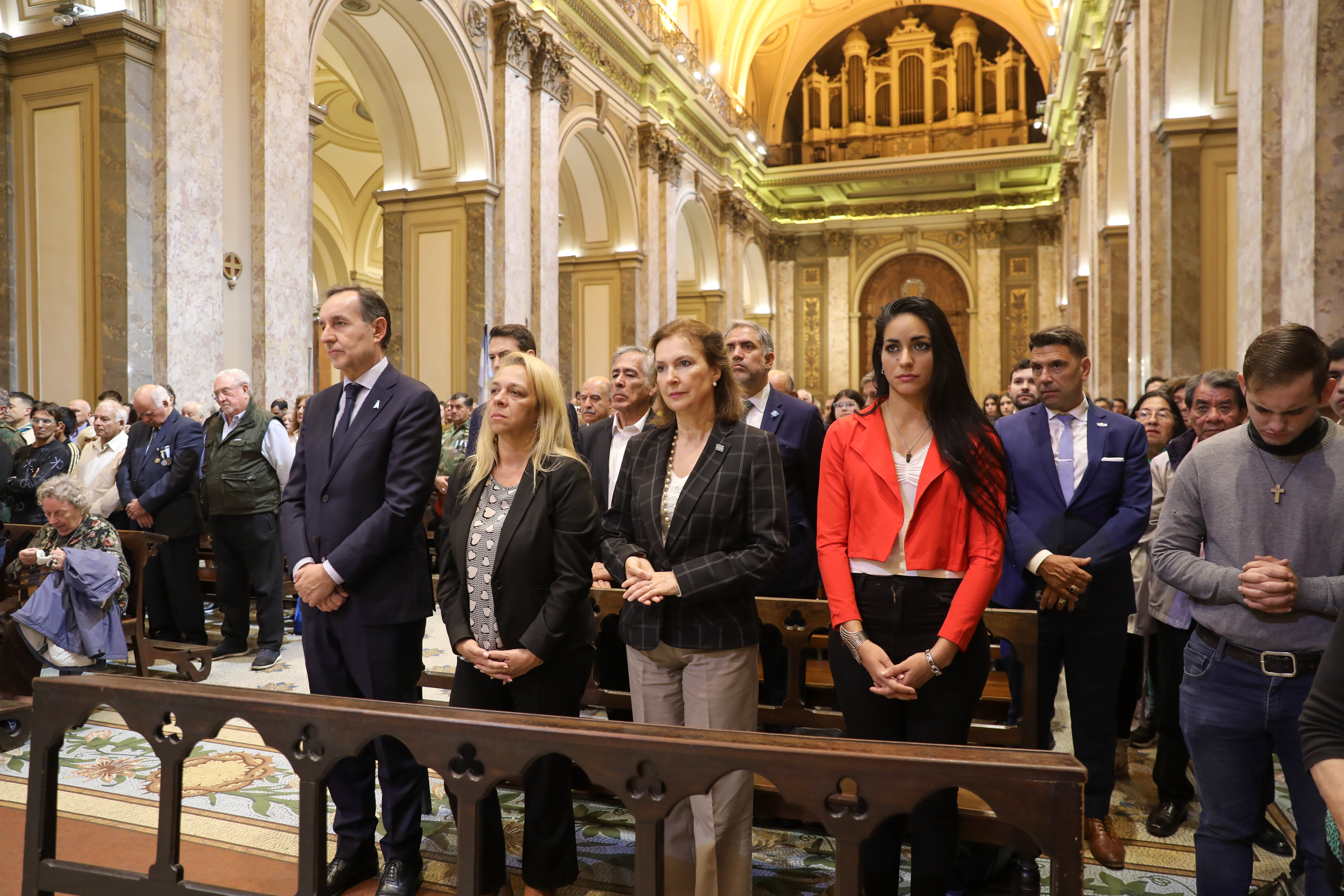
Argentines during a Catholic Mass. Christianity is the majority, historical, and cultural religion in Argentina.

A majority of the population of Argentina is Christian. According to CONICET survey on creeds, about 76.5% of Argentines are Roman Catholic, 11.3% religiously indifferent, 9% Protestant (with 7.9% in Pentecostal denominations), 1.2% Jehovah's Witnesses, and 0.9% Mormons.

Argentina is home to the largest Jewish population in Latin America and 6th in the world, numbering 182,300 individuals or 0.45% of the population. On a city level, Buenos Aires has the second largest population of Jews in the Americas, second only to New York City.

Argentina is also home to the largest Muslim minority in Latin America (see Islam in Argentina). Although accurate statistics on religion are not available (because the national census does not solicit religious data), the actual size of Argentina's Muslim community is estimated to be around 1% of the total population (400,000 to 500,000 members), according to the International Religious Freedom Report in 2015. Buenos Aires hosts the largest mosque in Latin America.

Buenos Aires also features notable Greek, Armenian and Russian Orthodox churches, Presbyterian Korean and Anglican churches, as well as Buddhist temples, among other minority religions.

== Emigration ==
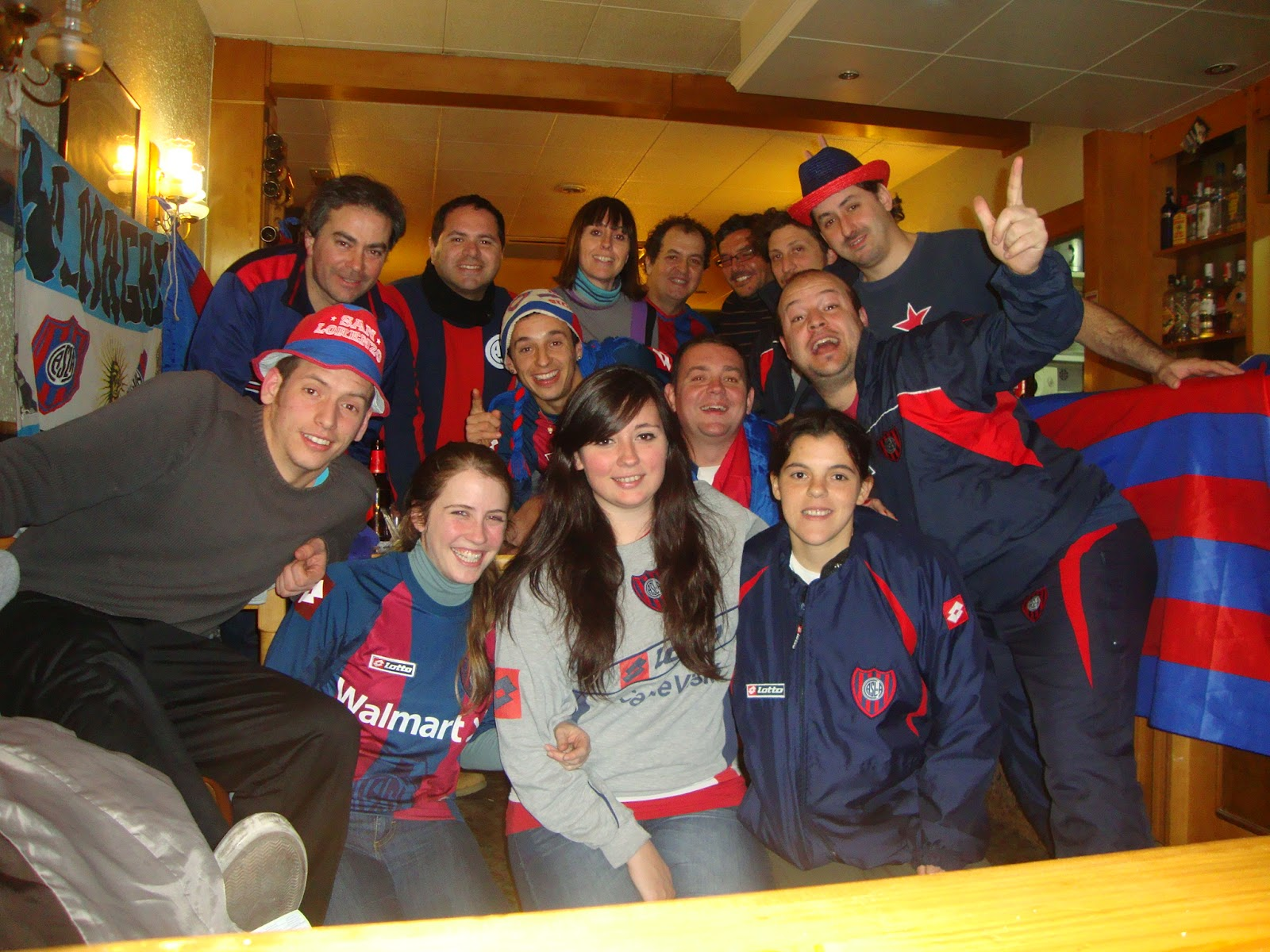
Supporters of Club Atlético San Lorenzo de Almagro of Barcelona.

According to official estimates there are 600,000 Argentines worldwide, and according to estimates by the International Organization for Migration there have been about 806,369 since 2001. The first wave of emigration occurred during the military dictatorship between 1976 and 1983, principally to Spain, the United States, Mexico and Venezuela. During the 1990s, due to the abolition of visas between Argentina and the United States, thousands of Argentines emigrated to North America. The last major wave of emigration occurred during the 2001 crisis, mainly to Europe, especially Spain, although there was also an increase in emigration to neighboring countries, particularly Brazil, Chile and Paraguay.

=== Europe ===
The rate of Argentine emigration to Europe (especially to Spain and Italy) peaked in the late 1970s and early 1980s and is noteworthy. Spain and Italy have the largest Argentine communities in Europe, however, there are also important communities in France, the United Kingdom and Germany.

=== Americas ===
The most popular immigration destinations in the Americas are: the United States and Brazil, and to a lesser degree, mostly to (Uruguay and Canada): Chile, Paraguay and Bolivia, while other communities settled in Venezuela, Peru, Colombia, Ecuador and Costa Rica.

=== Middle East ===
Israel is home to the largest Argentine diaspora in the Middle East.

=== Oceania ===
In Oceania, Australia has the largest Argentine community, followed by New Zealand.

== See also ==
- List of Argentines
- Ethnography of Argentina
- Demographics of Argentina
- Criollo people
- Immigration to Argentina
- History of Argentine nationality

- Indigenous peoples in Argentina
- Argentines in Uruguay
- Argentine Brazilians
- Argentina
- Argentine Americans
- Argentine Mexicans
- Argentines in Spain
- South Americans
