= Argentina–Montenegro relations =

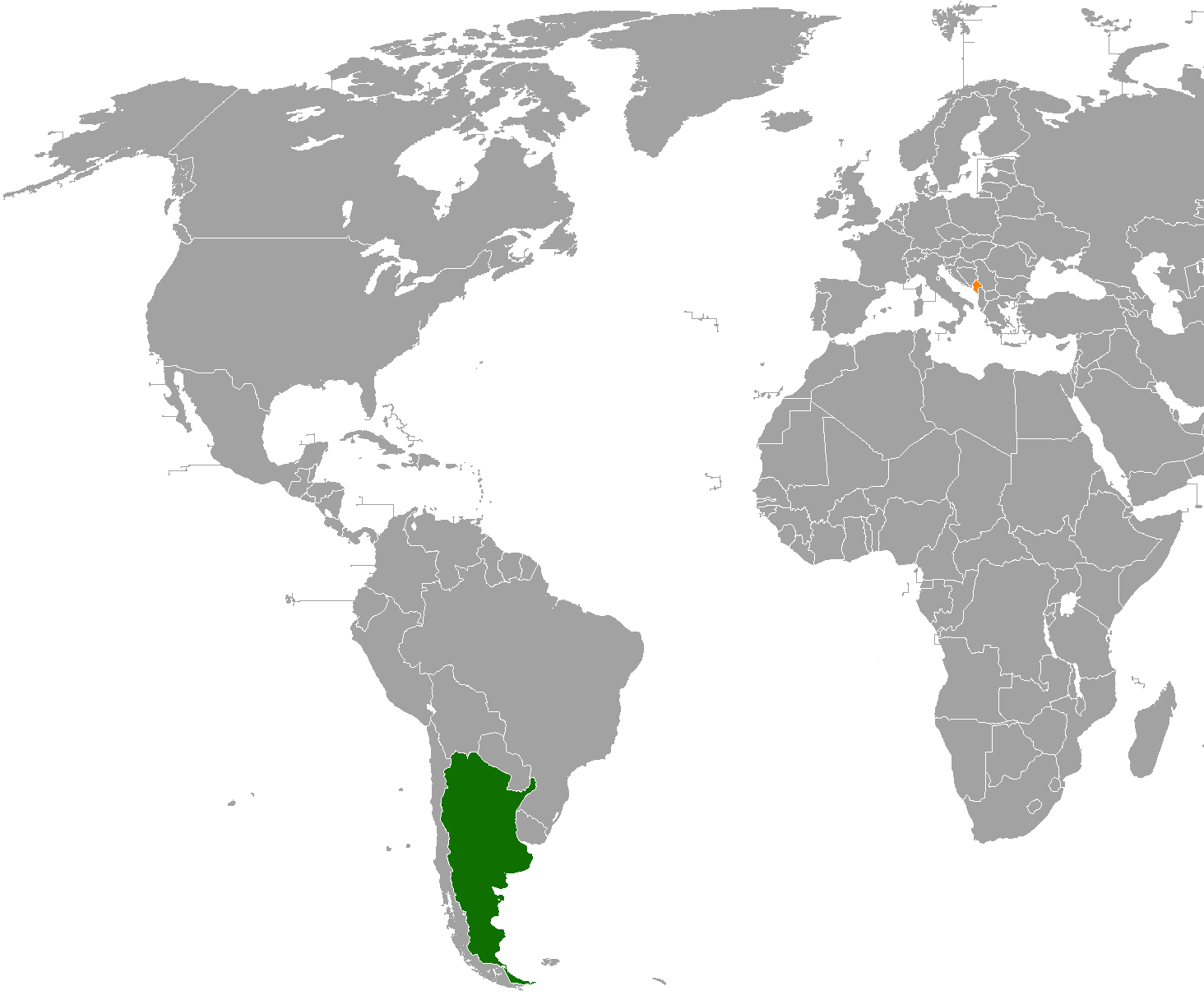

- Argentina: Montenegro

Argentina and Montenegro have a long-standing bilateral relationship. Both nations are members of the United Nations.

== History ==
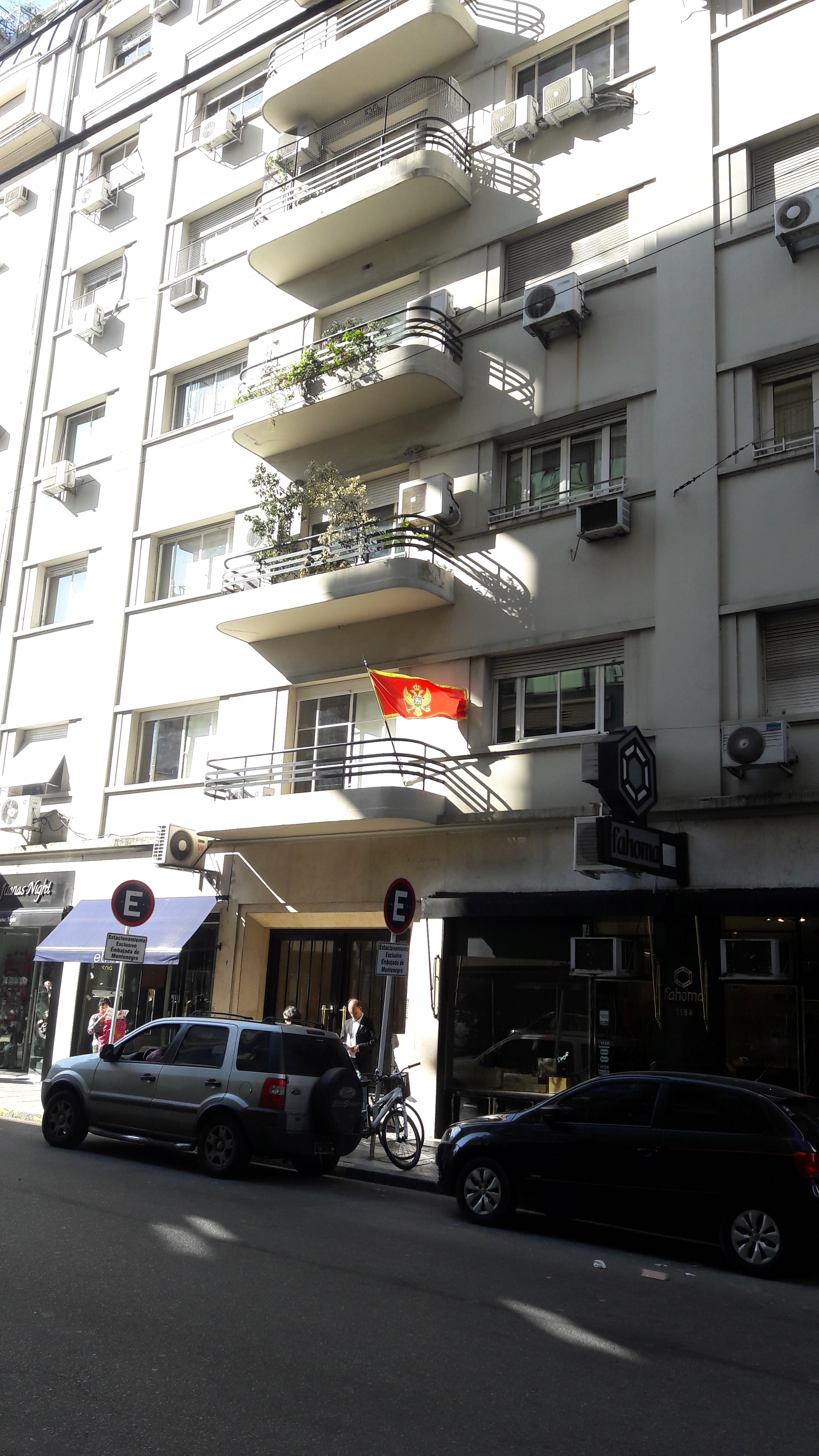
Embassy of Montenegro in Buenos Aires

Argentina has the largest communities of ethnic Montenegrins outside Europe. During the early 1900s, Montenegrins from the Kingdom of Montenegro began emigrating to the country, and nowadays there are approximately 80,000 Montenegrins and descendants living in Argentina. Currently most of them are settled in the northern province of Chaco, while the remaining part lives in Buenos Aires, Tandil, Venado Tuerto, and General Madariaga, a town of around 5,000 inhabitants.

Argentina officially recognized Montenegro's Independence on 23 June 2006, and diplomatic relations was established on 13 September, 2006. Argentina is accredited to Montenegro through its embassy in Belgrade, Serbia. And since 2013, Montenegro has an embassy in Buenos Aires, which is the only Montenegrin embassy in Latin America.

== Resident diplomatic missions ==
- Argentina is accredited to Montenegro from its embassy in Belgrade, Serbia.
- Montenegro has an embassy in Buenos Aires.

== See also ==
- Montenegrin Argentine
- Argentina–Serbia relations
- Gallery of the Non-Aligned Countries "Josip Broz Tito"
