= Montenegrin Bolivians =

Bolivians of Montenegrin birth or descent

Montenegrin Bolivians Crnogorski Bolivijanci Црногорски Боливијци
Total population
- Unknown; 1,500-2,000 (2017 estimate)

Regions with significant populations
- La Paz, Santa Cruz, Cochabamba

Languages
- Bolivian Spanish, Montenegrin

Religion
- Predominantly Eastern Orthodox

Related ethnic groups
- Montenegrins, Montenegrin Argentine, Montenegrin Chileans

Montenegrin Bolivians are Bolivians who are of Montenegrin origin. The figure includes all people affiliated with Bolivia who claim Montenegrin ancestry, both those born in the country and naturalized citizens, as well as those with dual citizenship who affiliate themselves with both countries or cultures.
