= Diocese of Buenos Aires =

The term Diocese of Buenos Aires may refer to:

- Roman Catholic Diocese of Buenos Aires, former name (diocese created in 1620, elevated to Archdiocese in 1866)
- Greek Orthodox Archdiocese of Buenos Aires and South America, an archdiocese (metropolis) of the Ecumenical Patriarchate of Constantinople
- Antiochian Orthodox Archdiocese of Buenos Aires and Argentina, an archdiocese of the Greek Orthodox Patriarchate of Antioch
- Serbian Orthodox Diocese of Buenos Aires, an Eastern-Orthodox diocese of the Serbian Orthodox Church, created in 2011

== See also ==
- Buenos Aires
- Catholic Church in Argentina
- Serbian Orthodox Church in North and South America
