= Serbian Orthodox Eparchy of Buenos Aires, South America, and Central America =

Diocese of the Serbian Orthodox Church

Location
- Territory: South America and Middle America
- Headquarters: Buenos Aires, Argentina

Information
- Denomination: Eastern Orthodox
- Sui iuris church: Serbian Orthodox Church
- Established: 2011
- Cathedral: Cathedral of the Nativity of the Theotokos, Buenos Aires
- Language: Church Slavonic, Serbian, Spanish

Current leadership
- Bishop: Kirilo Bojović

Website
- Serbian Orthodox Eparchy of Buenos Aires, South America, and Central America

The Serbian Orthodox Eparchy of Buenos Aires, South America, and Central America (Serbian: Српска православна епархија буеносајреска и јужноцентралноамеричка, romanized: Srpska pravoslavna eparhija buenosajreska i južnocentralnoamerička; Spanish: Diócesis ortodoxo serbia de Buenos Aires, Sudamérica y Centroamérica) is a diocese (eparchy) of the Serbian Orthodox Church. The diocese encompasses 20 places of worship in Argentina (with episcopal seat located in Buenos Aires); 16 in Brazil; 5 in Colombia; four each in Peru and Nicaragua; three each in Venezuela, Ecuador, and Costa Rica; two each in Chile, Bolivia, Guatemala, and El Salvador; and one each in Dominican Republic and Panama.

Among Serb and Montenegrin diaspora communities in Argentina, Orthodox Christianity functions as a key ethnic marker. Emigrants have therefore underscored the central role of the Serbian Orthodox Church in their social and cultural existence. Driven by the imperative of group ‘survival’ this need has historically, and continues to, express itself chiefly through communal organization and gatherings in the church, with homeland clubs playing a secondary role.

== See also ==
- Serbian Orthodox Church in North and South America
- Assembly of Canonical Orthodox Bishops of Latin America
- Eparchies and metropolitanates of the Serbian Orthodox Church
- Serbs in South America

== Sources ==
- Vuković, Sava (1998). History of the Serbian Orthodox Church in America and Canada 1891–1941. Kragujevac: Kalenić.
