= Attempted assassination of Ante Pavelić =

1957 murder of NDH dictator

- Part of the aftermath of World War II in Yugoslavia and the Cold War
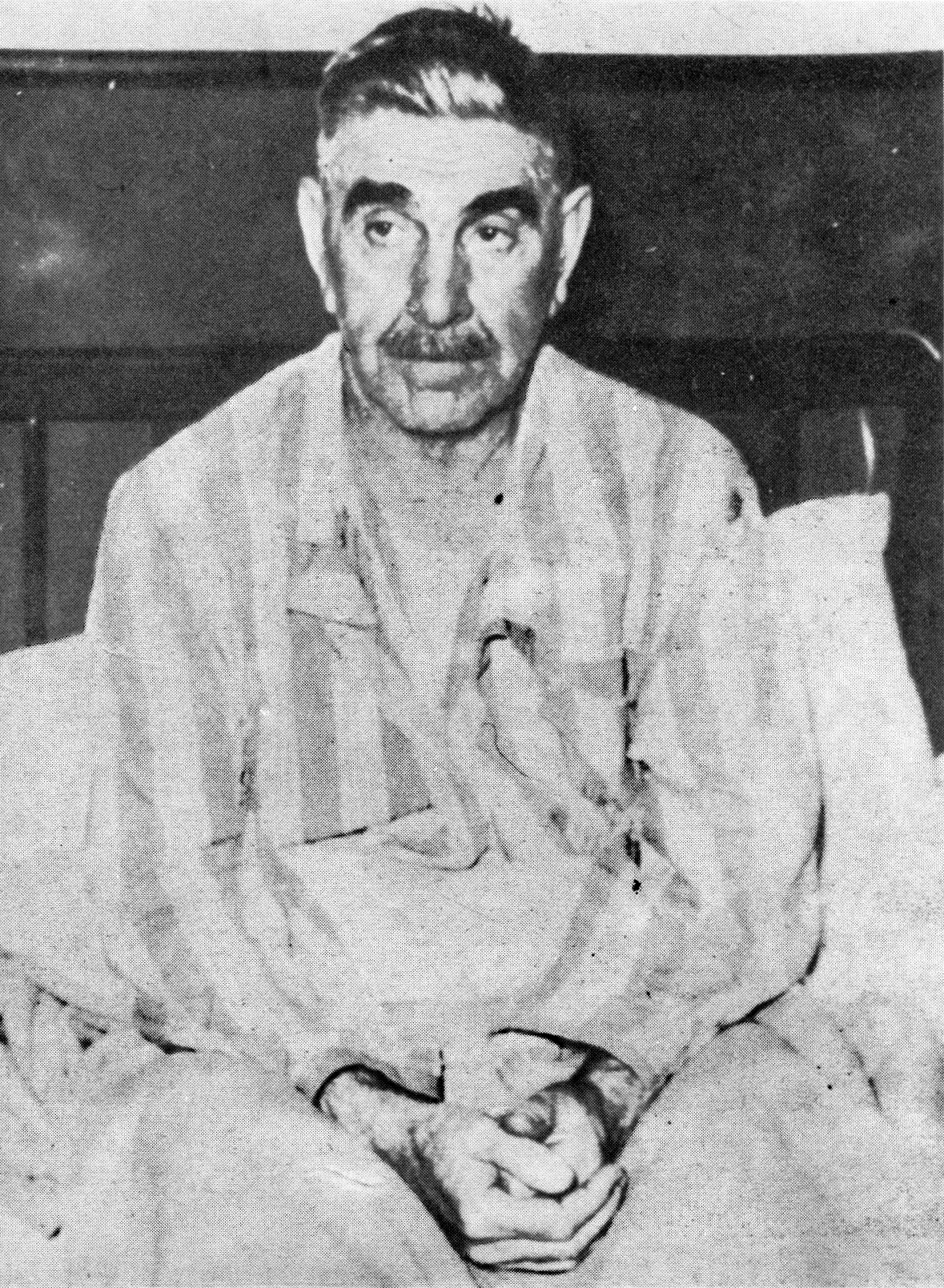
- Pavelić after the assassination attempt
- Date: April 10, 1957
- Location: Buenos Aires, Argentina
- Type: Assassination by shooting
- Target: Ante Pavelić
- Perpetrator: unknown
- Organized by: unknown
- Participants: Blagoje Jovović (claimed)
- Outcome: Successful: Ante Pavelić eventually dies from complications from gunshot wounds on 28 December 1959
- Deaths: 1

Ante Pavelić, the dictator of the Independent State of Croatia who fled Yugoslavia through the ratlines, was shot on April 10, 1957, in Buenos Aires, Argentina. He died two years later from wounds sustained in the assassination attempt.

== Background ==
After the end of World War II, several members of the NDH government were executed after a one-day trial in Zagreb on 6 June 1945. Shortly after this, Pavelić moved to Austria. There, he remained for a few months before fleeing to Rome, where the Catholic Church sheltered him despite his condition as a war criminal (as evidenced in declassified documents from United States intelligence agencies). Briefly detained by the British in Austria, he was released.

Pavelić arrived in the Italian capital in 1946, disguised as a monk and with a Spanish passport. Croatian-run San Girolamo degli Illirici College aided exiled Ustaše, and Pavelić sheltered there and in other locations around Rome until 1948. The United States secret services knew that he was living in Rome but were not interested in the arrest of any anti-communist from Eastern Europe, due to the growing tension with the Soviet bloc. After considering his arrest, the possible loss of sympathies among the Ustaše émigrés led the military authorities to desist from arresting him. Six months later, in November 1948, he fled to Argentina on board the Italian ship Sestriere. Pavelić had maintained correspondence with the Archbisop of Buenos Aires, Monsignor De Andrea. The Vatican provided assistance with obtaining false documents and a Red Cross-issued passport, and he assumed the identity of a Sicilian Jew to flee the country. De Andrea helped him evade immigration control once he reached Argentina. Likewise, Pavelić also made his way to Francoist Spain and spent some time there alongside 25,000 Nazis and Nazi collaborators who fled through the ratlines before returning to Argentina.

== Assassination ==
According to the United States Department of State, the government of Marshal Josip Broz Tito attempted to assassinate Pavelić on two occasions through the Yugoslav secret services (UDBA), yet he survived both attempts with injuries.

On 10 April 1957, Pavelić was wounded in Buenos Aires by an assailant. Out of five shots, one hit his clavicle and a second hit near his spine, the rest missing. At that time, he was reportedly sought by the UDBA, as well as by the Israeli Mossad. As the Argentine government agreed to extradite him to Yugoslavia, he fled to Chile and then took refuge with his family in Madrid, Spain with assistance from the Franco regime. Pavelić eventually died there in 1959 from his injuries.

== Aftermath ==
Pavelić was buried in the Saint Isidore cemetery in Madrid.

The Spanish state, however, did not provide sufficiently convincing proof of Pavelić's death: no photograph was released, nor could any Yugoslav official confirm his death; consequently, the Yugoslav state doubted this information until 1980, the year of Tito's death. Between 1981 and 1987, the Yugoslav authorities requested access to Pavelić's remains to confirm his death, without success. The dissolution of Yugoslavia into several states from 1991 put an end to these proceedings.

== Attribution ==
A 1992 book Pet hitaca u Pavelića (transl. Five shots at Pavelić) by writer and publicist Đurica Labović describes a UDBA agent named "Žarko" as Pavelić's assassin, who was acting on instructions from the Yugoslav diplomatic and consular mission in Argentina.

The assassination is often attributed to Blagoje Jovović, a Serbian nationalist and Montenegrin émigré to Argentina. In 1998, a book about Jovović's claims was published by Tihomir-Tiho Burzanović, entitled Two Bullets for Pavelić („Два метка за Павелића”). Jovović was a participant in World War II, who initially fought for the Yugoslav Partisans and then the Chetniks. Jovović first publicly made the claim that he was the assassin in 1999 upon returning for the first time to Yugoslavia and visiting Ostrog, where he met with the Metropolitan of Montenegro Amfilohije Radović.

The lack of reliable information around the attempt makes it unclear if Jovović was working for the Yugoslav State Security Service, or if he was even the assassin. The Yugoslav State Security Service was interested in silencing Pavelić through kidnapping or assassination, and many Croat émigrés blamed the Yugoslav state for the attempt.

Mate Nikola Tokić of the Central European University writes that Jovović was the most likely assailant. Conversely, the Montenegrin historian and politician Novak Adžić has disputed the theory of Jovović as the assassin, citing the lack of primary documents and mentions of Jovović anywhere prior to his alleged confession in 1999, as well as the fact that the post-World War II Chetnik emigration never mentioned it either.

== Legacy ==
Pavelić's grave became a place of homage for Croatian neo-Nazis. In 1996, Croatian footballer Davor Šuker visited it alongside "two prominent members of the Zagreb [criminal] underworld", and was photographed in front of it. His grave has also been visited by Goran Kovač Macko, the leader of the ultras group Bad Blue Boys, along with around 200 Dinamo Zagreb fans in 1997, Croatian Minister of Health Milan Kujundžić in 2003, and former Homeland Movement politician Martin Pauk in 2025.

In 2019, Pavelić's grave was vandalised with graffiti of a hammer and sickle, Communist star and the Cyrillic letters "СКОЈ", an abbreviation referring to the Yugoslav Communist Party.

== Sources ==
- Delić, Ante (2011). "On the concealment of Ante Pavelić in Austria in 1945–1946". Review of Croatian History. VII (1): 293–313.
- Trifkovic, Srdja (2011). Ustaša: Croatian fascism and European politics, 1929-1945 (2nd ed.). The Lord Byron Foundation for Balkan Studies. ISBN 9781892478016. OCLC 747097858.
