= Italian language in Argentina =

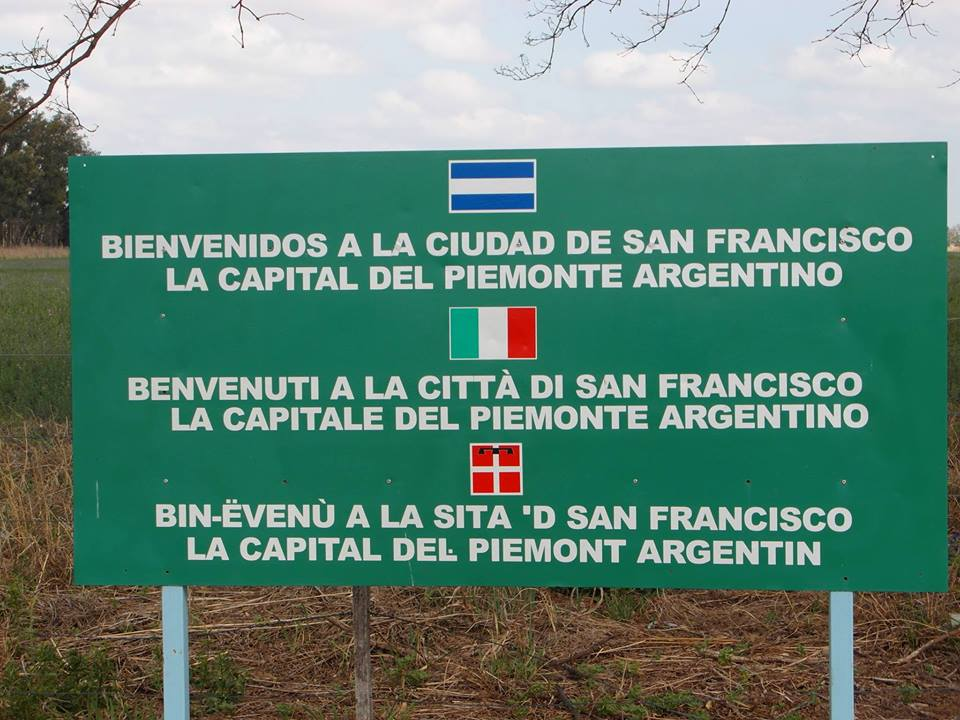
Sign in San Francisco, Córdoba, in Spanish, Italian and Piedmontese, reading: "Welcome to the city of San Francisco, the capital of the Argentine Piedmont".

According to Ethnologue, Italian is spoken by approximately 1,120,000 people in Argentina, making it the third most spoken and fourth most studied language in the country. The sociocultural blending of Italian and Spanish resulting from Italian immigration gave rise to the Cocoliche pidgin, Lunfardo slang, and Rosarigasino slang, introducing Italianisms into the Rioplatense dialect and, to a lesser extent, the Cordoban and Cuyan dialects. Jorge Luis Borges famously stated that "an Argentine is an Italian who speaks Spanish".

== History ==
=== Argentine educational system (1863-1941) ===
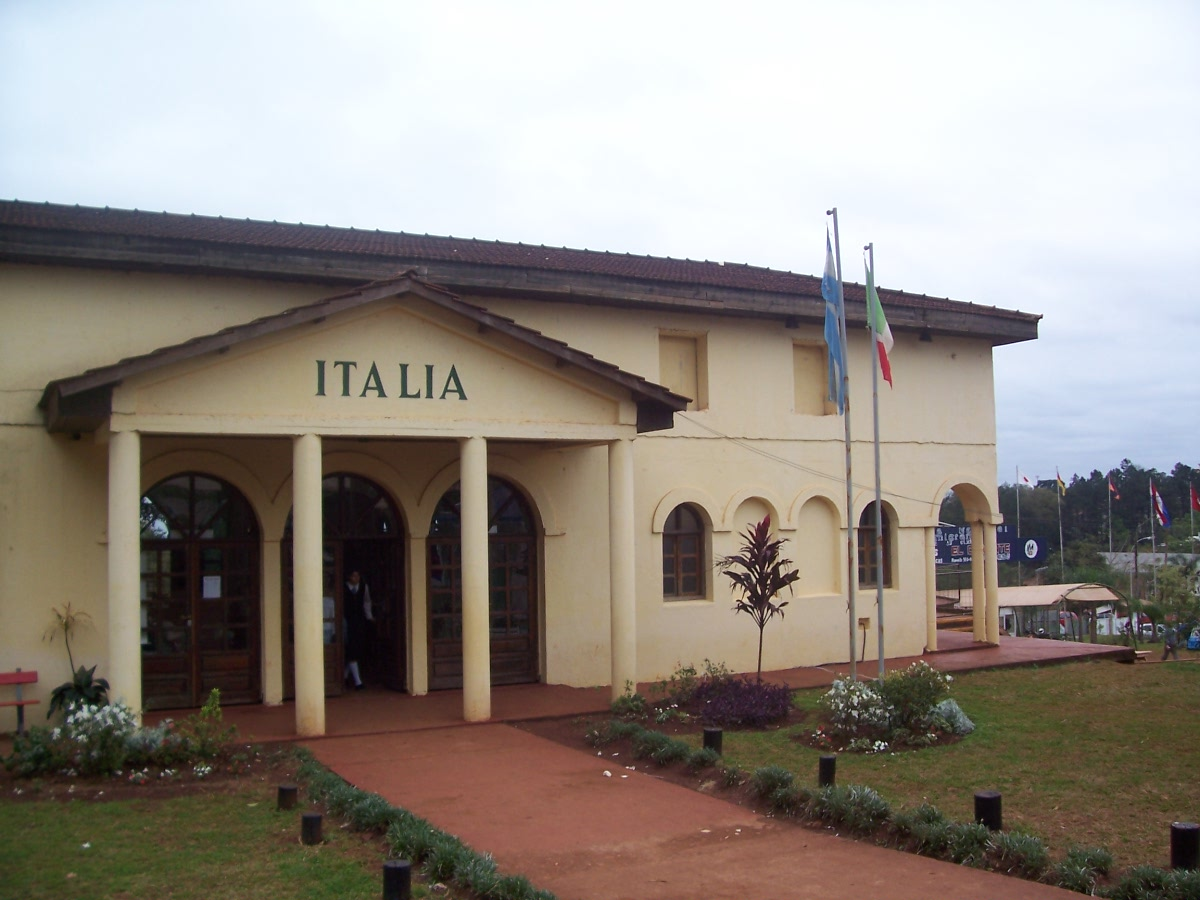
House of the Italian Community of Oberá, Misiones.

By the mid-19th century, a need arose to equip nation-states with educational systems. In Argentina, this system emerged by assigning distinct functions to each of its levels. Primary schools were tasked with shaping citizens. Teaching Spanish, the national language, was crucial in a country defined by immigration; consequently, neither Italian nor other European languages were excluded. This policy served two objectives: first, to "Argentinize" the children of foreigners—not only through language but also through customs and a sense of national identity; and second, to dissolve foreign enclaves—particularly those formed by Italian immigrants—which the ruling sectors perceived as a threat.

The inclusion of foreign languages aimed to train the country's future ruling elites—modeled after European elites—through national secondary schools. For this reason, such schools were established early on in every provincial capital. Foreign languages were a fundamental component of these schools from their inception, as their study sought to facilitate the reading of great European intellectuals and foster an understanding of a culture deemed "superior". Furthermore, proficiency in foreign languages was associated with erudition. Italian was introduced as a third language in these schools—initially through specific national academic chairs—before being fully integrated into the system in 1941 under the "Rothe Plan". The reasons for including Italian mirrored those justifying the teaching of other foreign languages and were unrelated to the country's large Italian population. The 1912 "Garro Plan" highlighted the teaching of Italian as a source of academic value and prestige in Argentina.

This period concludes with the "Rothe Plan," which proved decisive due to the changes it introduced regarding the structure of secondary education and the inclusion of foreign languages within the system. It eliminated the simultaneous teaching of foreign languages, citing pedagogical, cultural, and political arguments. The established structure consisted of three years dedicated to a Romance language and two years to an Anglo-Saxon language. Furthermore, it consolidated the preeminence of English at the secondary level (displacing French, which had previously been the dominant language). The decision to establish a basic cycle and an advanced cycle, as well as the elimination of the simultaneous teaching of foreign languages, was debated in numerous prior documents and finally implemented in 1941.

== Partnerships or offers ==
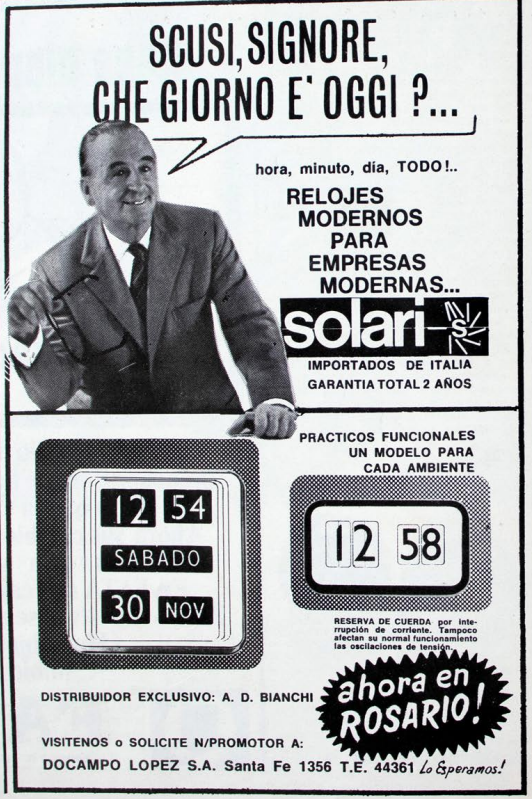
Argentine advertisement with Italian text from 1968.

Italian language instruction relies heavily on after-school and community activities dedicated to keeping the Italian language and culture alive. There are 1,372 associations, primarily based in Italy (1,207), Switzerland (62), and San Marino (11); two-thirds of these are regional in nature. Of the 873 registered offerings, courses account for 51%, exam preparation for 20%, and translation services for 24%, with the remaining 5% consisting of programs conducted abroad. Geographically, Italian language offerings are distributed as follows: 40% in the interior of the country, another 40% in the Autonomous City of Buenos Aires (CABA), and the remaining 20% in Greater Buenos Aires.

In the rest of the country, they cover 18 provinces, most notably Buenos Aires, Santa Fe, Córdoba, and Mendoza. In the Autonomous City of Buenos Aires (CABA), more than half of the offerings originate in the Macrocentro area (Balvanera, Tribunales, Retiro, Catedral, San Telmo, Montserrat, and Ingeniero Huergo), as well as in the neighborhoods of Palermo Chico, San Agustín, Botánico, and Nuestra Sra. del Valle. In Greater Buenos Aires, offerings are slightly more concentrated in the South (40%) compared to the North and West (30% each). Among the 447 courses offered, standard courses predominate at 65%, with the majority aimed at adults and—to a lesser extent—adolescents and children. Intensive courses rank second at 11%, followed by courses for specific purposes at 8%, particularly those related to travel or tourism and business/economics.

Preparation for international exams comprises 177 offerings: 49% in Buenos Aires City and Greater Buenos Aires, and 51% in the rest of Argentina. From an institutional standpoint, exams from the Dante Alighieri Society of Rome lead this market segment, accounting for 89% of the offerings distributed across nine levels of the PLIDA (Progetto Lingua Italiana Dante Alighieri) tests.

The 209 registered translation and/or interpretation services are concentrated primarily in CABA (71%—mainly the Macro-center and Northern zone), compared to the rest of the country (22%) and Greater Buenos Aires (7%). Public, technical, business, cultural, and scientific translation services lead the way in terms of the volume of offerings; however, the value of all categories becomes more apparent when professional subject areas are analyzed in greater detail—highlighting fields such as literature, websites, medicine, film and video, and finance, among others.

Regarding the 40 offerings of Italian courses and services abroad, they originate from both the Autonomous City of Buenos Aires (45%) and the interior of the country (45%), specifically from four provinces: Buenos Aires, Santa Fe, Córdoba, and Mendoza. The remaining offers come from Greater Buenos Aires (10%). Italian language courses in Italy predominate, followed to a lesser extent by travel visa or Italian citizenship processing services. Cultural or student exchange programs account for only 5% of the total offerings.

== See also ==
- Languages of Argentina
- Italian Argentines
