= Argentina–Serbia relations =

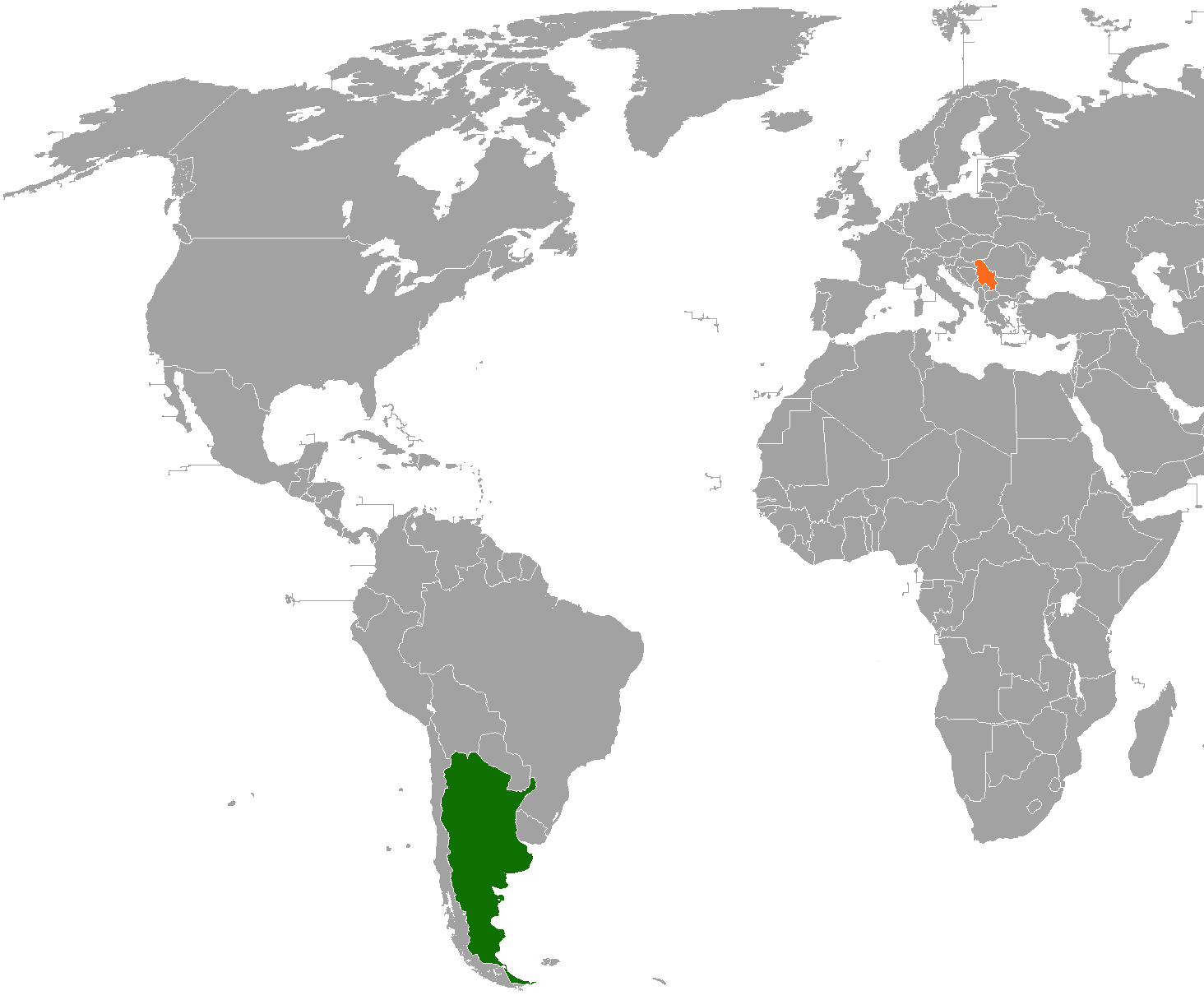
- Argentina: Serbia

Argentina and Serbia maintain diplomatic relations established between Argentina and Kingdom of Yugoslavia in 1938. From 1938 to 2006, Argentina maintained relations with the Kingdom of Yugoslavia, the Socialist Federal Republic of Yugoslavia (SFRY), and the Federal Republic of Yugoslavia (FRY) (later Serbia and Montenegro), of which Serbia is considered shared (SFRY) or sole (FRY) legal successor.

== History ==
In the 1870s, the first registered Serbian immigrants arrived and settled in Argentina. By 1914, it was estimated that 38,000 Serbs had immigrated to Argentina since the arrival of the first immigrants.

== Argentina's stance on Kosovo ==
In 2008, after Kosovo declared independence, Argentine Foreign Minister Jorge Taiana said "if we were to recognise Kosovo, which has declared its independence unilaterally, without an agreement with Serbia, we would set a dangerous precedent that would seriously threaten our chances of a political settlement in the case of the Falkland Islands. Argentina will not recognize also because it supports the principle of territorial integrity." Additionally, he stressed that the 1999 UN Resolution 1244 called for the mutual agreement of all parties to solve the dispute. He said that President Cristina Fernández de Kirchner would not give any official statement on the issue, reiterating that there would be no recognition of Kosovo. Serbian Minister of Foreign Affairs Vuk Jeremić visited Argentina in 2008, and agreed with Argentine Foreign Minister Jorge Taiana, on a series of joint steps within international multilateral institutions related to Serbia's diplomatic approach to Kosovo. Argentina supported the initiative of Serbia within the UN General Assembly to ask the opinion of the International Court of Justice on the legality of recognising Kosovo's unilateral independence and actively advocated that this initiative is supported by Latin America countries and within the Non-Aligned Movement and Mercosur.

== Bilateral treaties ==
Dates	Treaty	City	Ratification
October 8, 1928	Convention on reciprocity in the payment of compensation for industrial accidents	Buenos Aires	January 9, 1935
September 19, 1946	Agreement establishing diplomatic and trade relations	Buenos Aires	September 19, 1946
June 19, 1965	Commercial Agreement	Buenos Aires	May 10, 1967
July 19, 1974	Draft Agreement on Economic Cooperation	Buenos Aires	
September 21, 1977	Final Act of the II Meeting of the Joint Argentine-Yugoslav Commission	Belgrade	
September 21, 1977	Agreement on Scientific and Technical Cooperation	Belgrade	August 10, 1979
September 21, 1977	Convention on Economic and Technical Cooperation	Belgrade	November 3, 1978
August 4, 1981	Agreement on abolishing visas for diplomatic and official passports	Belgrade	August 31, 1981
October 26, 1987	Agreement on abolishing visas for ordinary passports	Buenos Aires	October 16, 1988
October 27, 1987	Veterinary and Sanitary Agreement	Buenos Aires	June 27, 1988
October 27, 1987	Convention on Cultural Cooperation	Buenos Aires	June 20, 1996
November 26, 2014	Agreement on Scientific and Technological Cooperation	Buenos Aires	November 26, 2014
November 26, 2014	Agreement in Educational and Cultural Cooperation	Buenos Aires	November 26, 2014

== Resident diplomatic missions ==
- Argentina has an embassy in Belgrade.
- Serbia has an embassy in Buenos Aires.
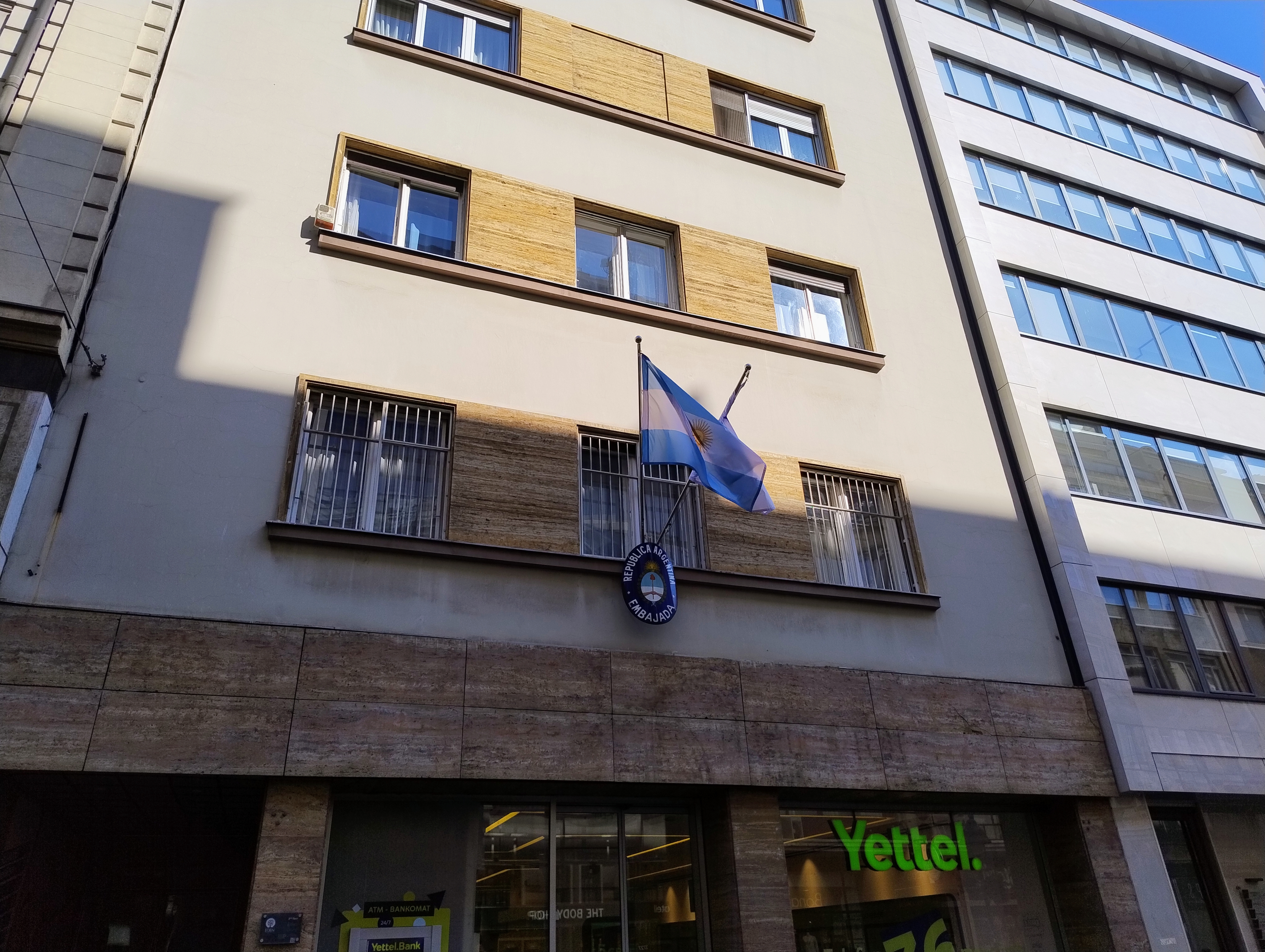
Embassy of Argentina in Belgrade

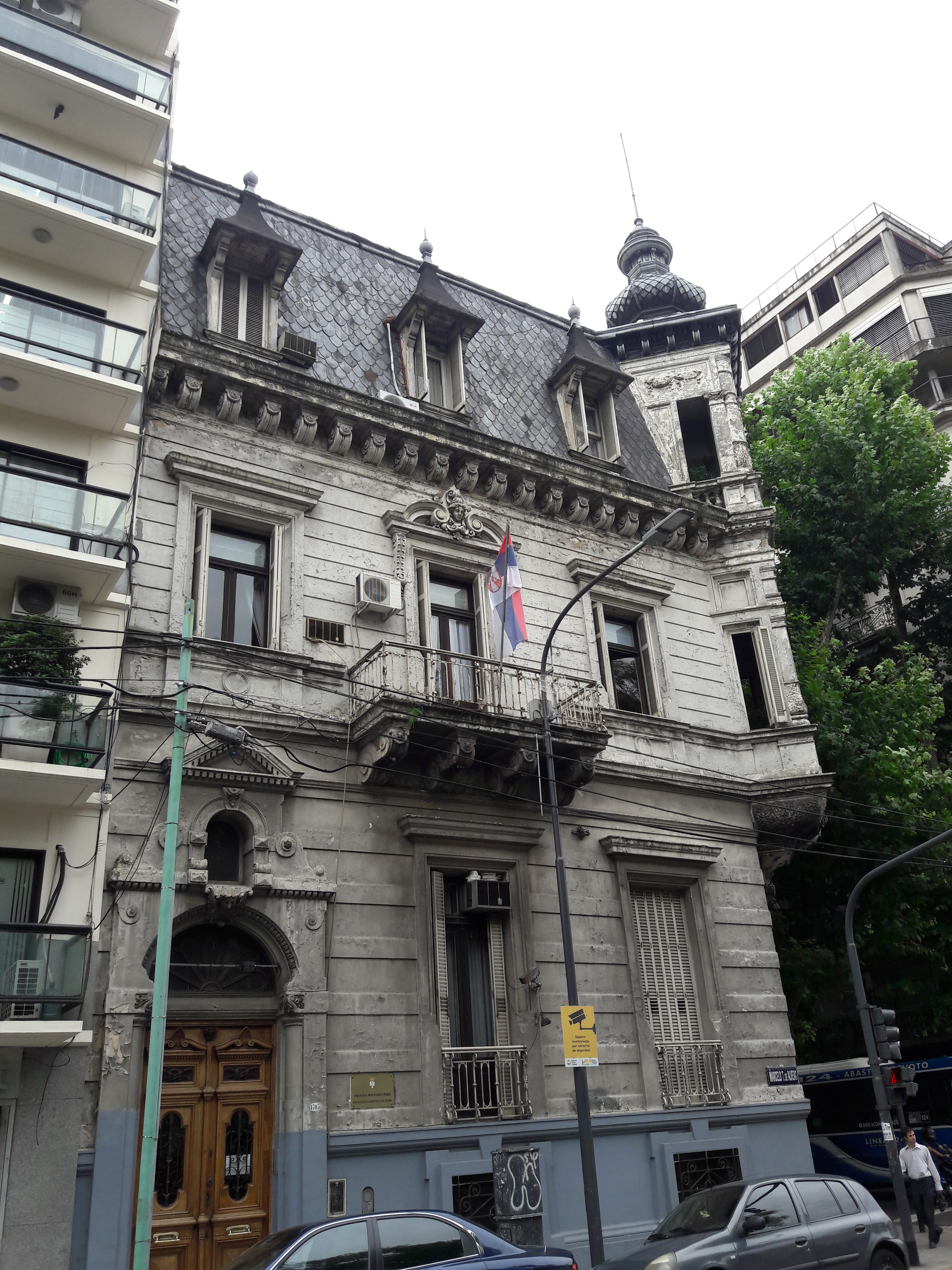
Embassy of Serbia in Buenos Aires

== See also ==
- Foreign relations of Argentina
- Foreign relations of Serbia
- Serbian Argentines
