= Miguel Avramovic =

Argentine rugby union player (born 1981)

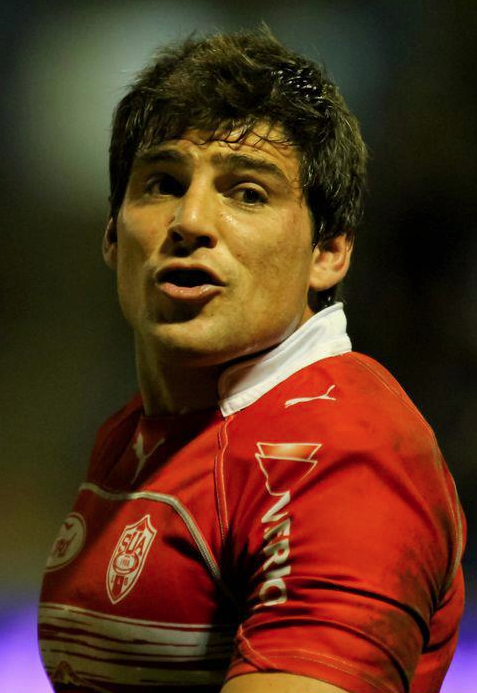
- Born: 18 July 1981 (age 45) Buenos Aires, Argentina
- Height: 1.85 m (6 ft 1 in)
- Weight: 98 kg (216 lb; 15 st 6 lb)
- University: University of Buenos Aires

Rugby union career
- Position(s): Centre, Fullback
Senior career
Years	Team	Apps	(Points)
- Club San Carlos
1998-2006	Asociación Alumni		
2006-2007	Worcester		
2007-2009	Montauban		
2009-2010	Pampas XV		
2010-2013	Agen		
2013-2014	Asociación Alumni		
International career
Years	Team	Apps	(Points)
2005-2009	Argentina	11	(20)
- Correct as of 30 September 2019

Miguel Avramovic (born 18 July 1981 in Buenos Aires) is a former Argentine rugby union footballer. He has also played for Worcester Warriors in the Premiership. He usually plays in at centre or fullback. He has 11 caps and 20 points (4 tries for Los Pumas.

He had 11 caps for the Argentina national team, from 2005 to 2009. He made his international debut for Argentina in April 2005 in a match against Japan. He then played two games for Argentina A in June, against the United States and a non-cap England XV. He earned another full two caps that year playing against Canada in July, and against Samoa in December. He played against Uruguay in July 2006 in what was a 2007 Rugby World Cup qualifying match.
