= Blagoje Jovović =

Serbian hotel owner and alleged assassin (1922–1999)

- Благоје Јововић
- Undated photo of Jovović
- Born: 25 December 1922; Kosić, Danilovgrad, Kingdom of Serbs, Croats and Slovenes (now Montenegro)
- Died: 2 June 1999 (aged 76); Rosario, Province of Santa Fe, Argentina
- Occupations: military officer hotel owner
- Known for: alleged role in the attempted assassination of Ante Pavelić

Blagoje Jovović (Serbian Cyrillic: Благоје Јововић; 25 December 1922 – 2 June 1999) was a Serbian hotel owner in Argentina, who was a participant of World War II in Yugoslavia initially as a member of the Partisan and later the Chetnik movement, and claimed to have shot former Croatian Ustaše leader and dictator Ante Pavelić in Argentina in 1957. Pavelić died in Madrid, Spain from his injuries two years later.

== Biography ==
Jovović was born in Kosić near Danilovgrad in today's Montenegro. During World War II, he initially fought for the Yugoslav Partisans and then the Chetniks, as a member of the Bjelopavlić Chetnik Brigade.

=== World War II ===
At the time when World War II started, he was serving in Strumica, near the Greek-Yugoslav border. When war broke out, Jovović reportedly returned to his birthplace, Kosić in Bjelopavlići. In July 1941, he took part in an antifascist uprising against Italian forces and later participated in the Battle of Pljevlja as a member of the Partisans. He later switched allegiances and fought for the Chetniks under the command of Bajo Stanišić, who collaborated with Fascist Italy.

In September 1944, he was part of the delegation led by Dušan Vlahović and Jakov Jovović, the latter being a royal Yugoslav naval officer. They were sent from Kotor across the Adriatic Sea to Taranto to negotiate with the British. There they were informed about the Allied change of support in favour of Tito's Partisans as a result of the agreement with Joseph Stalin at the Tehran Conference and they stayed in Italy until the remainder of the war. In 1948, Jovović emigrated to Argentina with the help of Jakov Jovović.

In Argentina, Jovović was known as the founder of the Serbian Orthodox community “Saint Sava”, and one of the founders of the Organisation of Fighters “Draža Mihailović” as well as the member of the Board of the “Njegoš” association.

=== Assassination of Pavelić ===
While living in Argentina and running a successful hotel enterprise that he owned, he received tips about Pavelić's whereabouts in Argentina. In the assassination attempt, Jovović received assistance from several people including Jakov Jovović and Milo Krivokapić, an associate of Blagoje. There are differing versions of how the attempted assassination unfolded.

Pavelić died on 28 December 1959 in Madrid from complications resulting from his wounds.

In 1998, a book about Jovović's claims was published by Tihomir-Tiho Burzanović. In 1999, Jovović went to Yugoslavia for the first time since he left and visited Ostrog, where he met with the Metropolitan of Montenegro Amfilohije Radović. It was there that he first publicly claimed that he was the person responsible for the attempted assassination of Ante Pavelić. By Jovović's own account, he acted on his own, independent of the Yugoslav or any other secret services, stating that he wanted to kill Pavelić in order to "avenge Serbian victims" from the "greatest butcher of Serbs".

Given the scarcity of reliable information surrounding Pavelić's assassination attempt, it is difficult to ascertain whether Jovović was in fact the assassin and whether or not he was acting on behalf of the Yugoslav State Security Service (UDBA). It is however known that UDBA was interested in either abducting or killing him. Most Croat émigrés believed that the Yugoslav state was behind the assassination attempt. A 1992 book Pet hitaca u Pavelića (transl. Five shots at Pavelić) by writer and publicist Đurica Labović describes a UDBA agent named "Žarko" as Pavelić's assassin, who was acting on instructions from the Yugoslav diplomatic and consular mission in Argentina.

Mate Nikola Tokić of the Central European University writes that Jovović was the most likely assailant. Conversely, the Montenegrin historian and politician Novak Adžić has disputed the theory of Jovović as the assassin, citing the lack of primary documents and mentions of Jovović anywhere prior to his alleged confession in 1999, as well as the fact that the post-World War II Chetnik emigration never mentioned it either.

=== Death ===
Jovović died on 2 June 1999 in Rosario, Argentina.

== Memorials ==
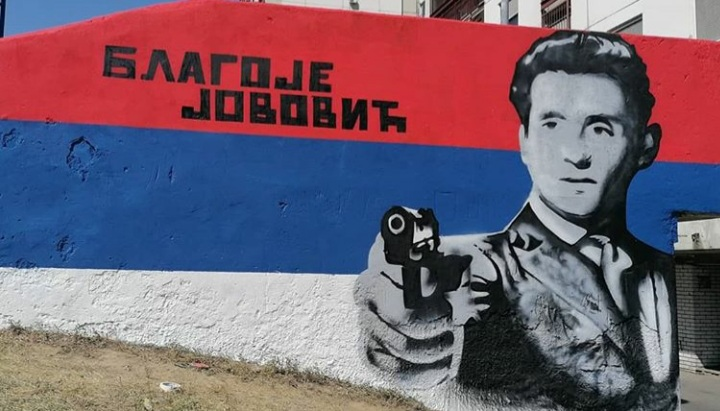
Mural depicting Jovović holding a pistol in Block 61, New Belgrade, with the Serbian tricolour in the background

In 2020, a street in Belgrade was renamed after Blagoje Jovović. A memorial plaque was also installed. A mural of him can be found in Block 61, New Belgrade.

The upcoming Serbian film The hand of justice (sr. Ruka pravde) tells the story of Jovović's assassination plot.

== See also ==
- Miloš Obilić, legendary assassin of Ottoman Sultan Murad I
- Gavrilo Princip, assassin of Austrian Archduke Franz Ferdinand
