= Romani people in Argentina =

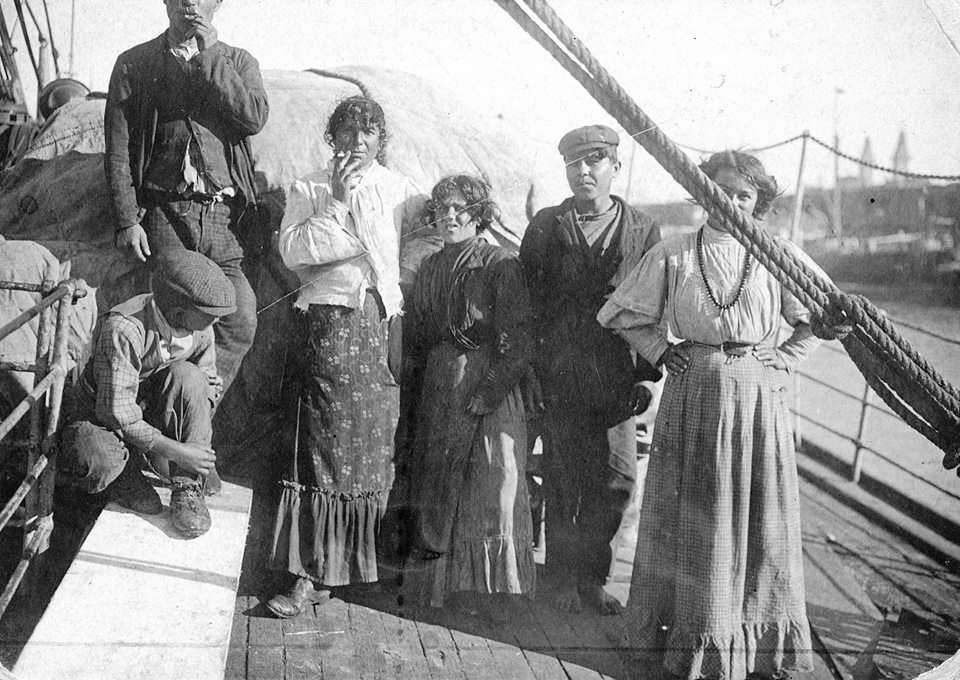
- Argentine Roma in 1919

Total population
- ≈ 300,000

Regions with significant populations
- Buenos Aires, Mar del Plata, Córdoba and Comodoro Rivadavia

Languages
- Argentinian Spanish, Romani

Religion
- Catholicism and Pentecostalism

The Roma community in Argentina (Spanish: Gitanos en Argentina) number more than 300,000. The first Roma to arrive in Argentina were Gitanos who came from Spain at different times and spoke only Spanish dialects instead of the Romani language. The Spanish Roma settled mainly in Buenos Aires.

== Notable people ==
- Sandro de América, singer and actor
