= Kosić, Montenegro =

Kosić Косић
- Village
- Location within Montenegro
- Coordinates: 42.521225°N 19.158106°E
- Country: Montenegro
- Municipality: Danilovgrad

Population (2011)
  - Total: 515
- Time zone: UTC+1 (CET)
  - Summer (DST): UTC+2 (CEST)

Kosić (Montenegrin Cyrillic: Косић) is a village in the municipality of Danilovgrad, Montenegro. It is located along the road from Podgorica to Danilovgrad.

== Demographics ==
According to the 2011 census, its population was 515.

Ethnicity in 2011
Ethnicity	Number	Percentage
Montenegrins	313	60.8%
Serbs	151	29.3%
other/undeclared	51	9.9%
Total	515	100%
