= Marcelo Burzac =

Argentine footballer

Personal information
- Full name: Raúl Marcelo Burzac
- Date of birth: February 14, 1988 (age 38)
- Place of birth: San Miguel de Tucumán, Argentina
- Height: 1.83 m (6 ft 0 in)
- Position: Attacking midfielder

Team information
- Current team: CA Fénix

Youth career
- Sportivo Guzman

Senior career*
Years	Team	Apps	(Gls)
2007–2010	River Plate	1	(0)
2010	La Paz		
2010–2011	Almagro		
2011	Los Andes		
2011–2012	CA Colegiales		
2012–2013	San Jorge	30	(1)
2013–2015	Sportivo Italiano	14	(2)
2015–	CA Fénix	3	(1)
- * Club domestic league appearances and goals as of 25 March 2015

Raúl Marcelo Burzac (born February 14, 1988) is an Argentine football midfielder who plays for CA Fénix. He is of ethnic Serb descent (his name in Serbian is rendered Марсело Раул Бурсаћ).

== Career ==
Burzac played for a number of local teams in Tucumán before being signed by River Plate. He played in the youth divisions of the club and made one senior appearance. While at River, Burzac was referred to in the Argentine press as the new Juan Román Riquelme. He was part of the squad that won the 2008 Clausura tournament, but did not play in any of the games.

In 2010, the Argentine midfielder joined Bolivian side La Paz F.C.
