= Montenegrin Argentines =

Argentine Montenegrins Argentinski Crnogorci
- (Argentina) (Montenegro)

Total population
- 80,000 (2024)

Regions with significant populations
- Chaco, Buenos Aires, Tandil, Venado Tuerto

Languages
- Montenegrin, Spanish

Religion
- Orthodox, Roman Catholic and Muslim

Related ethnic groups
- Other Montenegrins, Serbian Argentines

Argentine Montenegrins are people born in Argentina of Montenegrin descent. During the early 1900s, Montenegrins from the Kingdom of Montenegro began emigrating to the country, and nowadays there are approximately 80,000 Montenegrins and descendants living in Argentina. Currently most of them are located in the northern province of Chaco, while the remaining part lives in Buenos Aires, Tandil, Venado Tuerto, and General Madariaga.

Descendants of ethnic Montenegrins established Colonia La Montenegrina, the largest Montenegrin colony in the World, in which they are part of even today. General Madariaga is a specially important place for Montenegrins in Argentina since many of them have achieved a remarkable wealth there through the business of cattle breeding, and most Montenegrins and their descendants are buried in its cemetery. Additionally, the Montenegrin-Argentine organization, Yugoslav Society Njegoš (Sociedad Yugoslava Njegoš, previously called the Montenegrin Society and Montenegrin-Yugoslav Society for Mutual Aid before World War II) provides mutual aid inside the town. It is important to consider that the ethnic background of Montenegrin Argentines is not well-documented, and it is unclear whether all Montenegrin Argentines are of solely Montenegrin ethnic background or have a mixed Serbian-Montenegrin ancestry.

== Notable individuals ==
- Jorge Capitanich, politician, former senator and current governor of the Chaco Province
- Ljubo Čupić
- Emilio Ogñénovich, Roman Catholic bishop of the Roman Catholic Archdiocese of Mercedes-Luján, Argentina
- Esteban Saveljich, football player
- Gastón Bojanich, football player
- Nicolás Vuyovich, sportscar driver

== See also ==
- Argentina–Montenegro relations
- Montenegrin diaspora
- Argentines of European descent
