= Cuyo Spanish =

Dialect of Spanish

Cuyo Spanish or Cuyano Castilian (Castellano Cuyano) is the dialect of Spanish that evolved in the historical province of Cuyo and that is now spoken in the Argentine provinces of Mendoza and San Juan. To a lesser extent, it is also spoken in the provinces of San Luis and La Rioja. Cuyo Spanish shares a series of common traits with Chilean Spanish due to settlement history and commercial ties. Later on, under the Argentine Republic, Rioplatense Spanish, the dialect of Buenos Aires and Uruguay influenced Cuyo Spanish.
