= San Telmo, Buenos Aires =

Coordinates: 34°37′14″S 58°22′18″W

San Telmo
- Neighborhood of Buenos Aires
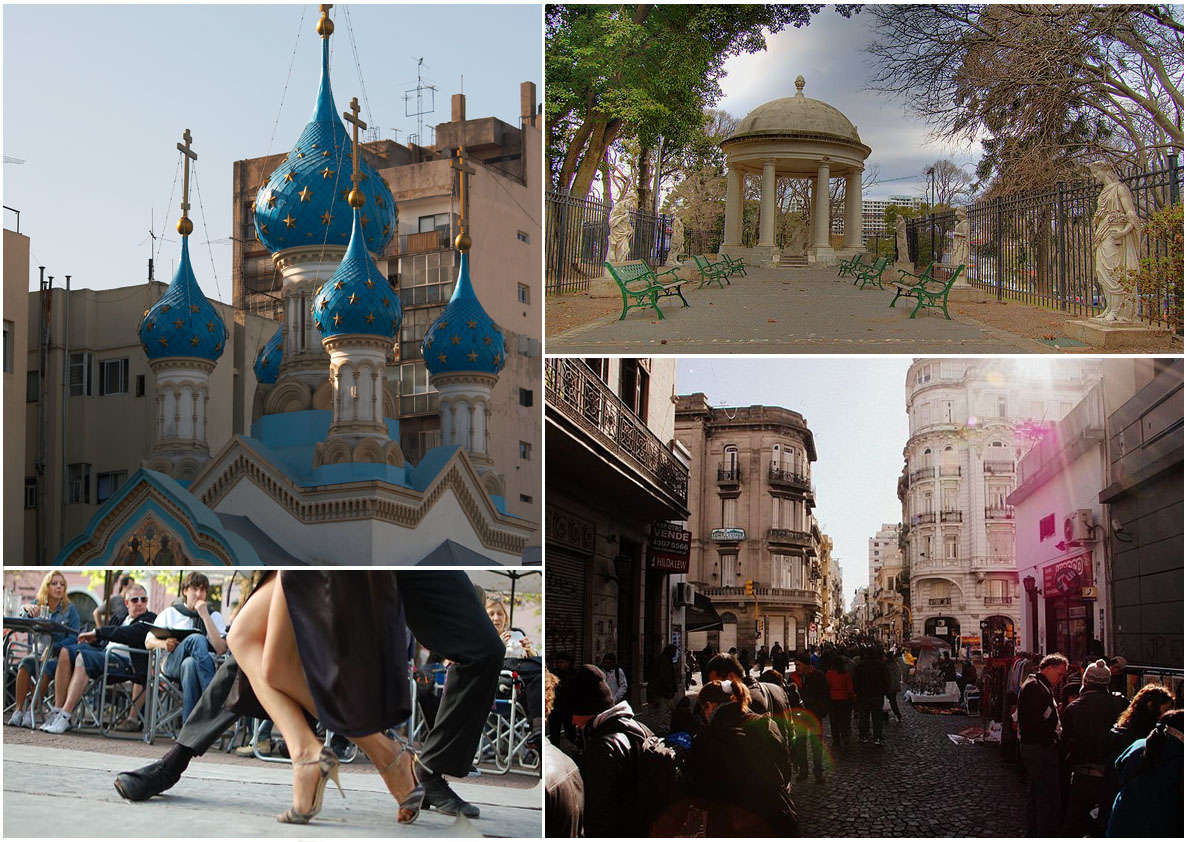
- Clockwise from top left: the Russian Orthodox Cathedral of the Holy Trinity, Lezama Park, antique fairs in Defensa Street, and a Tango show in Dorrego Square.

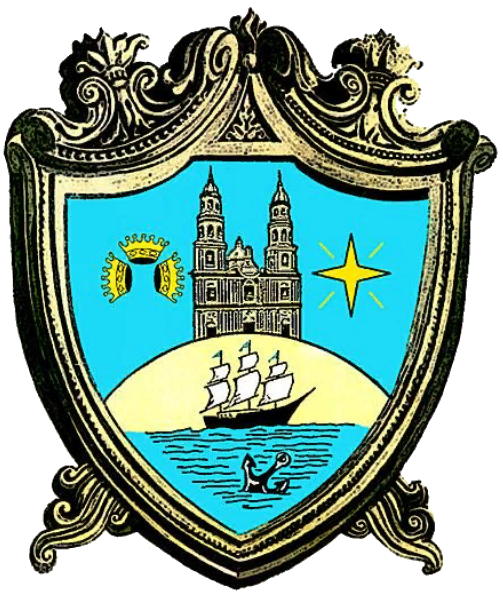
- Emblem
- Location of San Telmo within Buenos Aires
- Country: Argentina
- Autonomous City: Buenos Aires
- Comuna: C1
- Important sites: Plaza Dorrego; National Museum of History

Area
  - Total: 1.3 km^{2} (0.50 sq mi)

Population (2001)
  - Total: 25,969
  - Density: 20,000/km^{2} (52,000/sq mi)
- Time zone: UTC-3 (ART)

San Telmo ("Saint Pedro González Telmo") is the oldest barrio (neighborhood) of Buenos Aires, Argentina. A well-preserved area of the Argentine metropolis, it hosts some of its oldest buildings. One of the birthplaces of tango, during the mid 20th century it was the Bohemian district with painters ateliers and jazz clubs. Cafes, tango parlors and antique shops line the cobblestone streets, which are often filled with street artists and dancers.

San Telmo's attractions include old churches (e.g. San Pedro Telmo), museums, food halls and stalls, antique stores and a semi-permanent antique fair (Feria de Antigüedades) in the main public square, Plaza Dorrego. Tango-related activities for both locals and tourists are in the area.The "Manzana de las Luces" ("Enlightenment [city] block") hosted several colonial institutions.

== History ==
Known as San Pedro Heights during the 17th century, the area was mostly home to the city's growing contingent of dockworkers and brickmakers; the area became Buenos Aires' first "industrial" area, home to its first windmill and most of the early city's brick kilns and warehouses. The bulk of the city's exports of wool, hides and leather (the Argentine region's chief source of income as late as the 1870s) were prepared and stored here in colonial times. Their presence led to the first residential settlements in this area: that of Africans, slaves and free, alike.

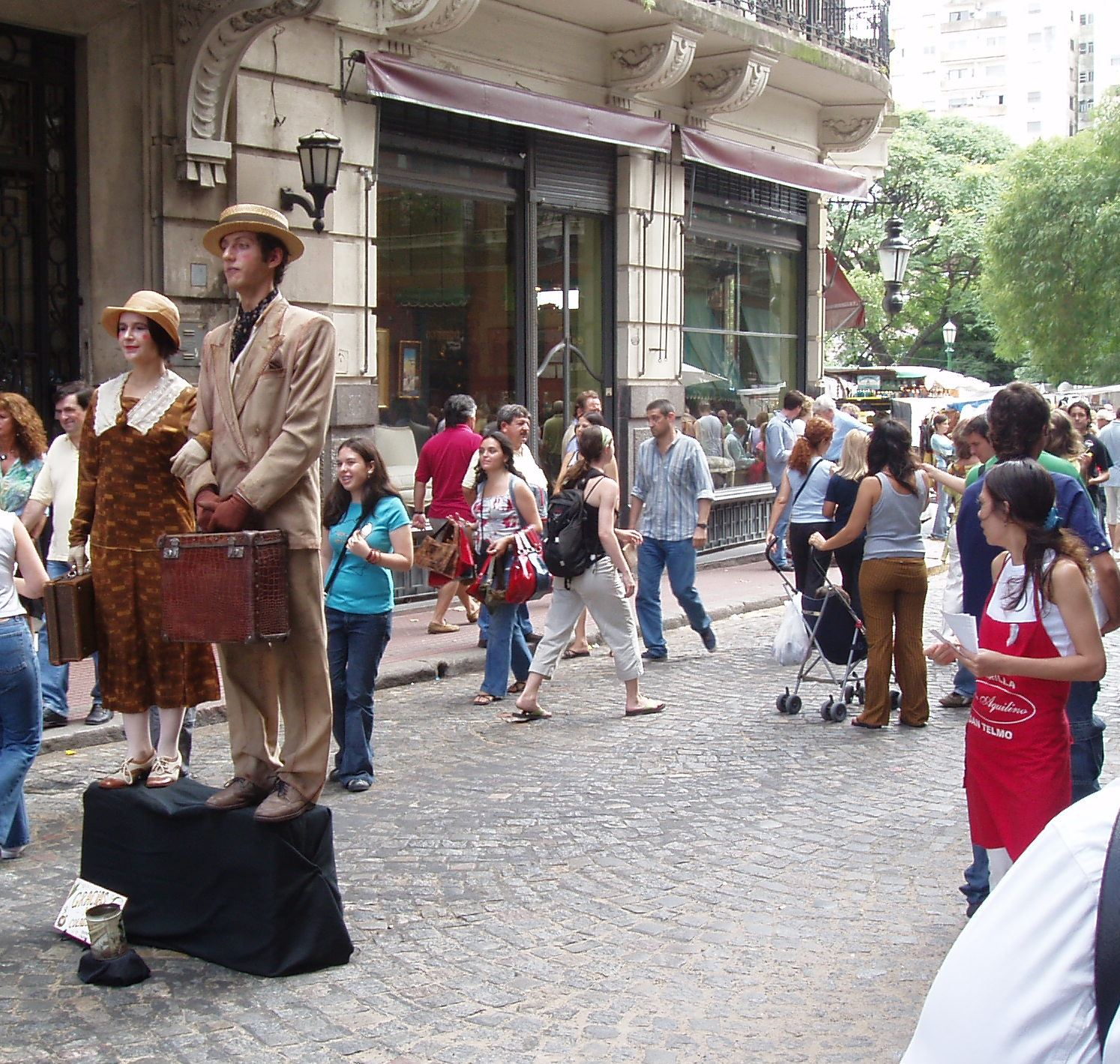
Street performers in San Telmo

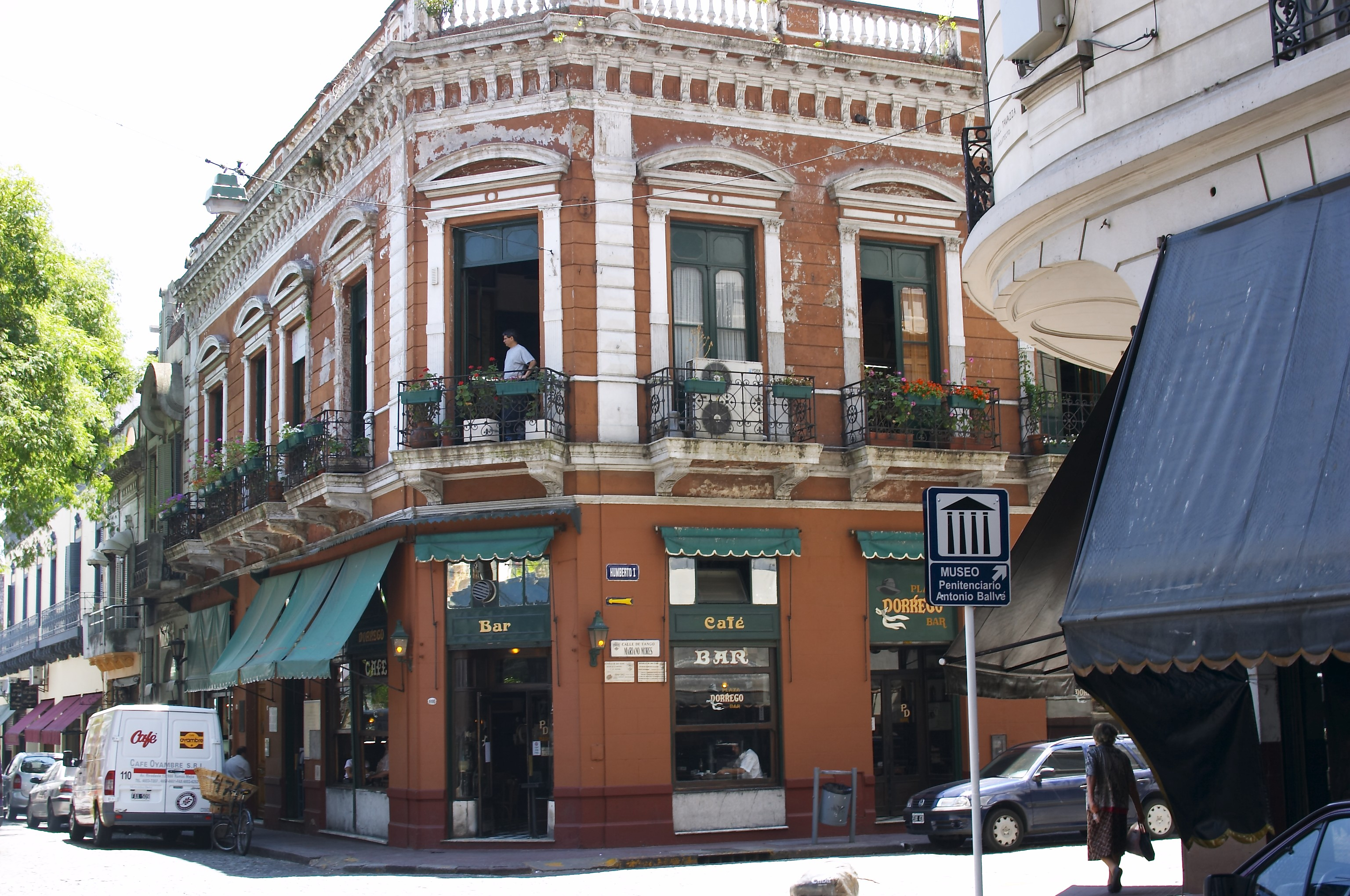
Dorrego Café

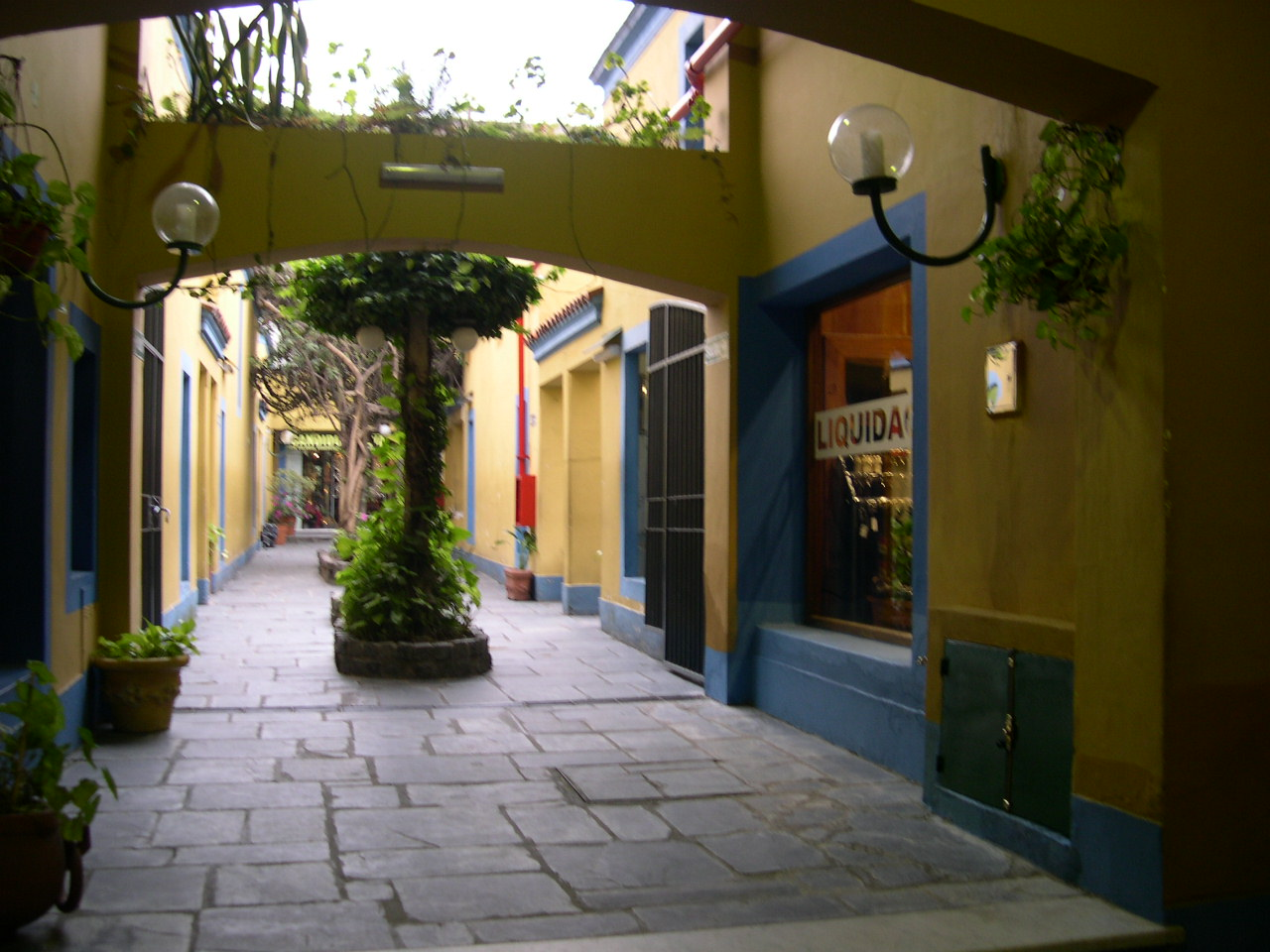
"El Solar de French," one of numerous colonial residences converted into lofts or galleries, since 1980

Previously separated from Buenos Aires proper by a ravine, the area was formally incorporated into the city in 1708 as the "Ovens and Storehouses of San Pedro." The neighborhood's poverty led the Jesuits to found a "Spiritual House" in the area, a charitable and educational mission referred to by San Pedro's indigent as "the Residence;" their 1767 suppression led to the mission's closure, however.

The void left by the Jesuits' departure was addressed by the 1806 establishment of the Parish of San Pedro González Telmo (or "San Telmo"), so named in honor of the Patron Saint of seafarers. This move failed to replace the lost social institutions, however, and San Telmo languished well after Argentine independence in 1816. The Jesuit Residence, restored as a clinic by Guatemalan friars, was shuttered in 1821, and San Telmo saw no public works for the next 30 years except a Black Infantrymen's Quarters and the construction of the dreaded Mazorca Dungeon by Governor Juan Manuel de Rosas.

San Telmo began to improve despite these challenges, particularly after Rosas' removal from power in 1852. The establishment of new clinics, the installation of gas mains, lighting, sewers, running water and cobblestones and the opening of the city's main wholesale market led to increasing interest in the area on the part of the well-to-do and numerous imposing homes were built in the western half of San Telmo. This promising era ended abruptly when an epidemic of yellow fever struck the area in 1871. The new clinics and the heroic efforts of physicians like Florentino Ameghino helped curb the northward spread of the epidemic; but as time went on it claimed over 10,000 lives, and this led to the exodus of San Telmo's growing middle and upper classes into what later became Barrio Norte.

At first hundreds of properties became vacant. A few of the larger lots were converted into needed parks, the largest of which is Lezama Park, designed by the renowned French-Argentine urban planner Charles Thays in 1891 as a complement to the new Argentine National Museum of History. Most large homes, though, became tenement housing during the wave of immigration into Argentina from Europe between 1875 and 1930. San Telmo became the most multicultural neighborhood in Buenos Aires, home to large communities of British, Galician, Italian and Russian-Argentines. The large numbers of Russians in San Telmo and elsewhere in Buenos Aires led to the consecration of Argentina's first Russian Orthodox Church in 1901. Expanding industry to the south also led a German immigrant, Otto Krause, to open a technical school here in 1897.

San Telmo's bohemian air began attracting local artists after upwardly-mobile immigrants left the area. Increasing cultural activity resulted in the opening of the Buenos Aires Museum of Modern Art by critic Rafael Squirru in 1956, as well as in the 1960 advent of the "Republic of San Telmo," an artisan guild which organized art walks and other events. San Telmo's immigrant presence also led to quick popularization of tango in the area: long after that genre's heyday, renowned vocalist Edmundo Rivero purchased an abandoned colonial-era grocery in 1969, christening it El Viejo Almacén ("The Old Grocery Store"). This soon became one of the city's best-known tango music halls, helping lead to a cultural and economic revival in San Telmo.

The 1980 restoration of the former Ezeiza family mansion into the Pasaje de la Defensa ("Defensa Street Promenade"), moreover, has led to the refurbishment of numerous such structures, many of which had been conventillos (tenements) since the 1870s. As most of San Telmo's 19th century architecture and cobblestone streets remain, it has also become an important tourist attraction.

== Contemporary art ==
A great number of contemporary art galleries, art spaces and museums are located in this area. In 2005 the gallery and artist-run space Appetite opened and the Argentine public and media immediately noticed the crowds attending its openings and parties. Other art galleries began setting up in this neighborhood and it became a Mecca of contemporary art. The first to talk about it was Rolling Stone magazine which said in late 2006: "When all the movement seemed to be getting installed at Palermo, the Daniela Luna tornado opened the appetite with an art gallery in San Telmo and little by little is monopolizing the neighborhood and transferring the scene." A few months later the New York Times said that "To find Appetite, an avant-garde gallery that everyone I met recommended, I had to return to one of San Telmo's less atmospheric blocks." Many media remarked the transformation of San Telmo into a destination for contemporary art lovers, such as the newspaper La Nacion which counted around 30 galleries and art centers in 2008. Later that year, the same newspaper published another article that started: "Contemporary art moved into the neighborhood. San Telmo Art District is born."

== Image gallery ==
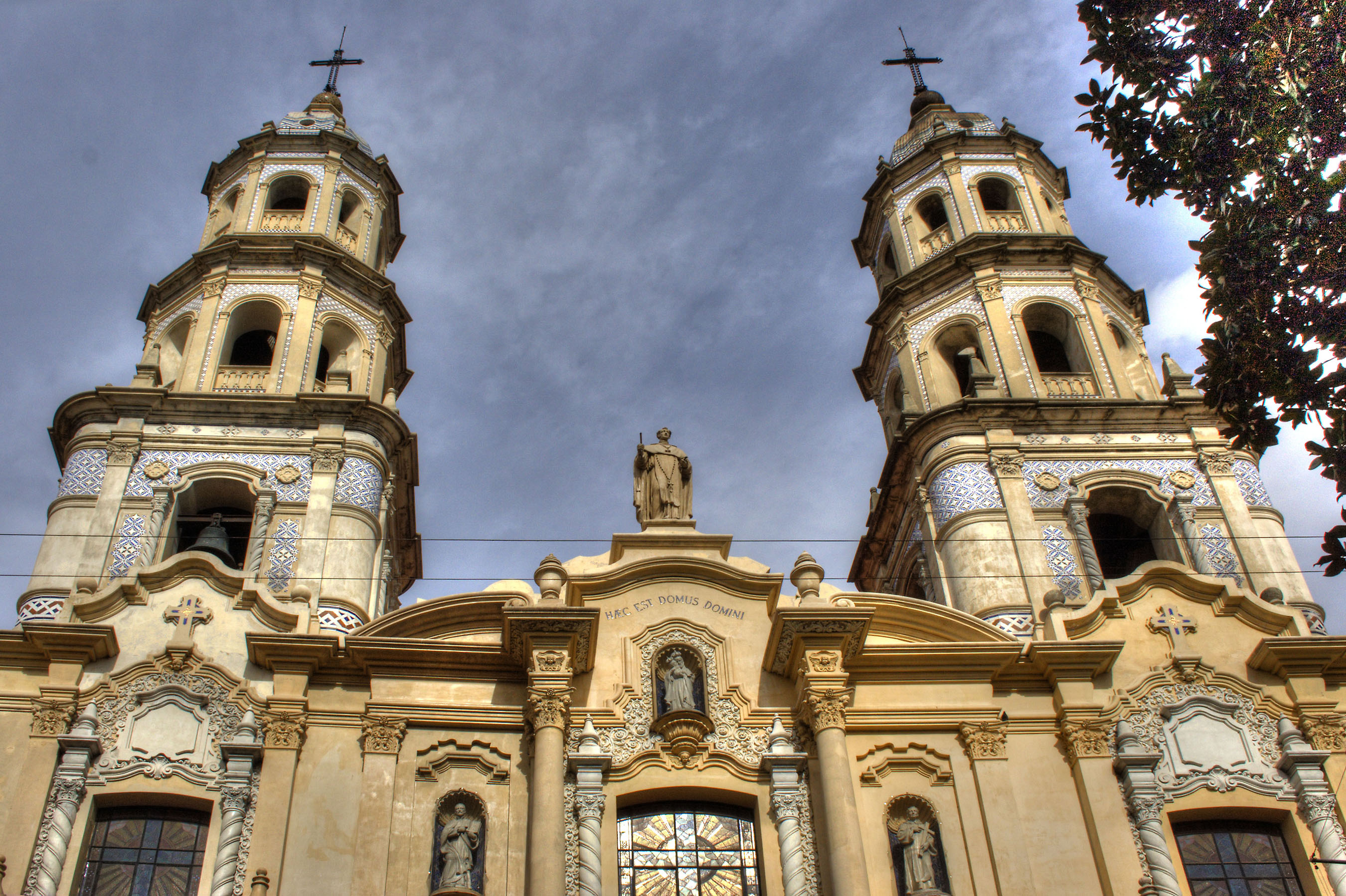
The Nuestra Señora de Belén Church at the heart of the San Telmo neighborhood

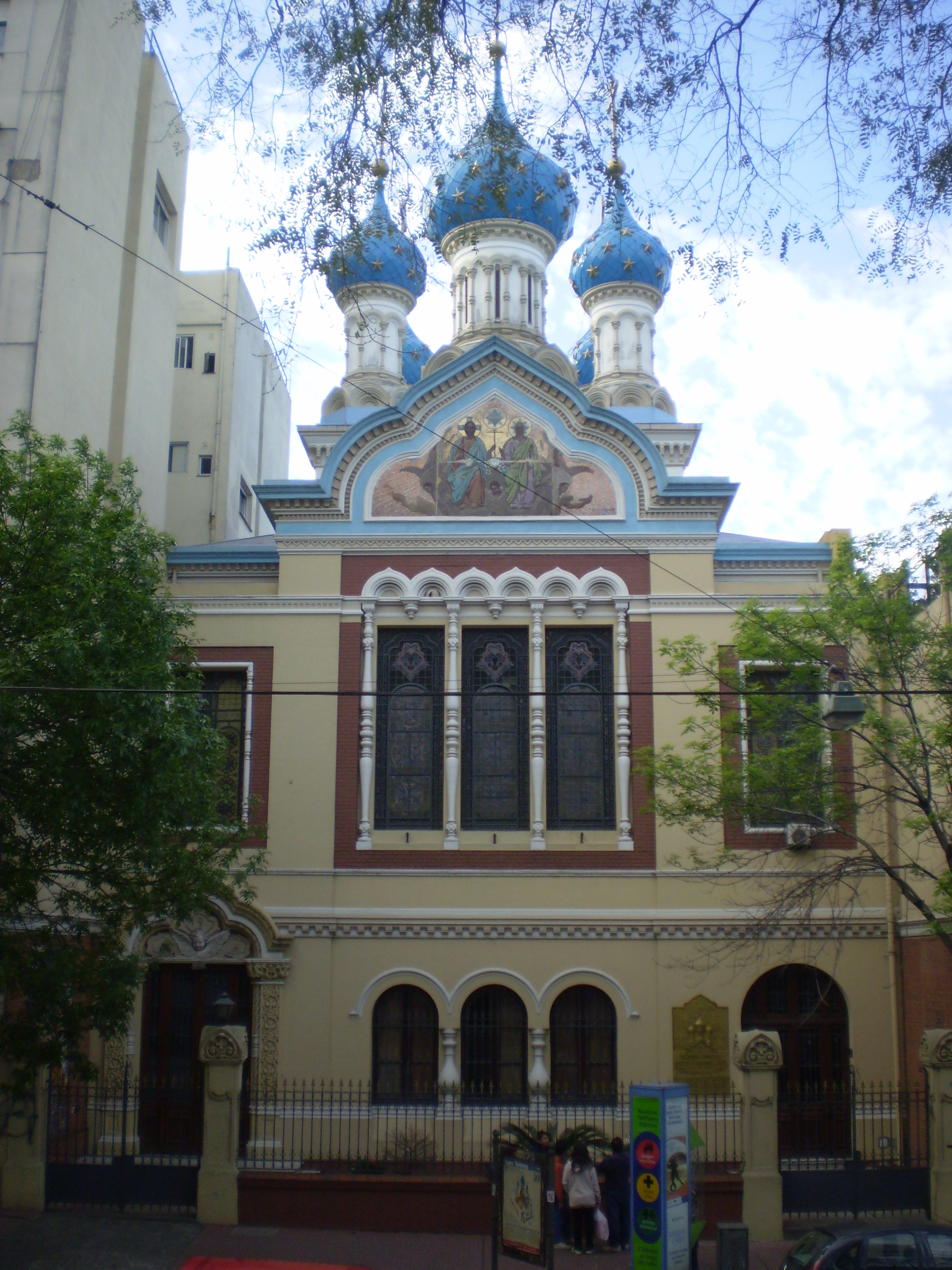
The Russian Orthodox Cathedral of the Holy Trinity

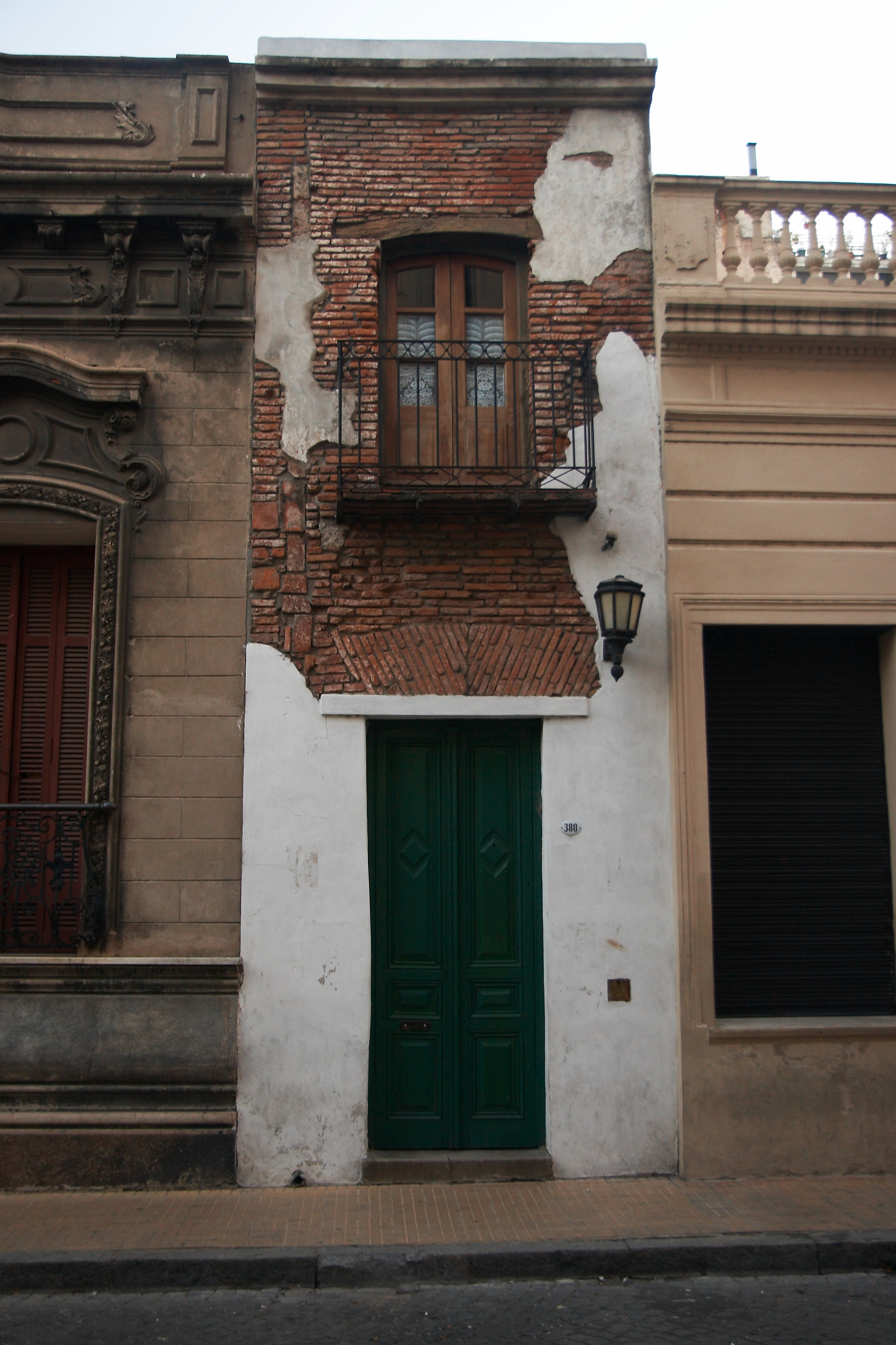
The Casa Mínima, built by freedmen following the 1812 abolition of slavery in Argentina

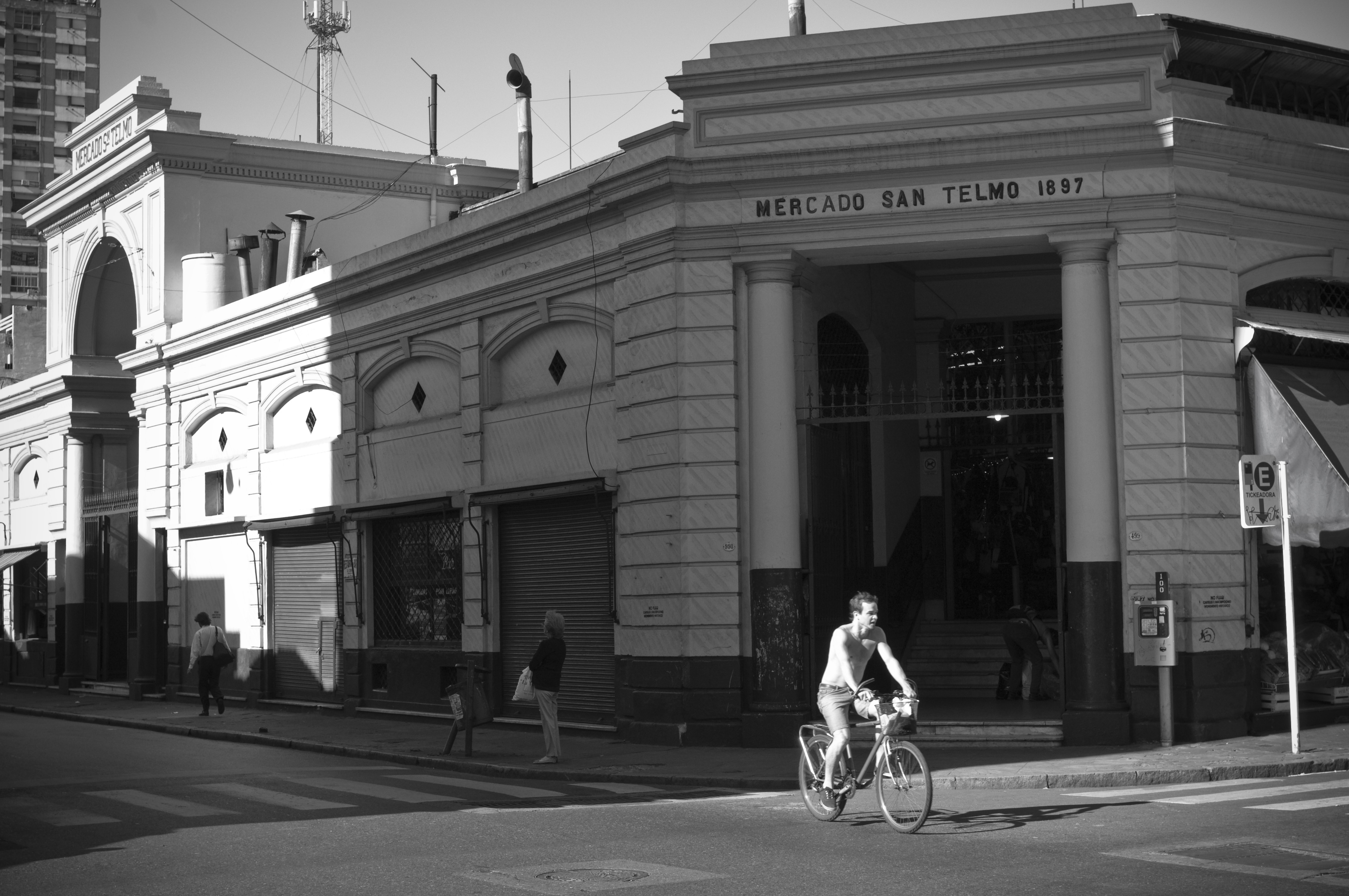
The San Telmo Market

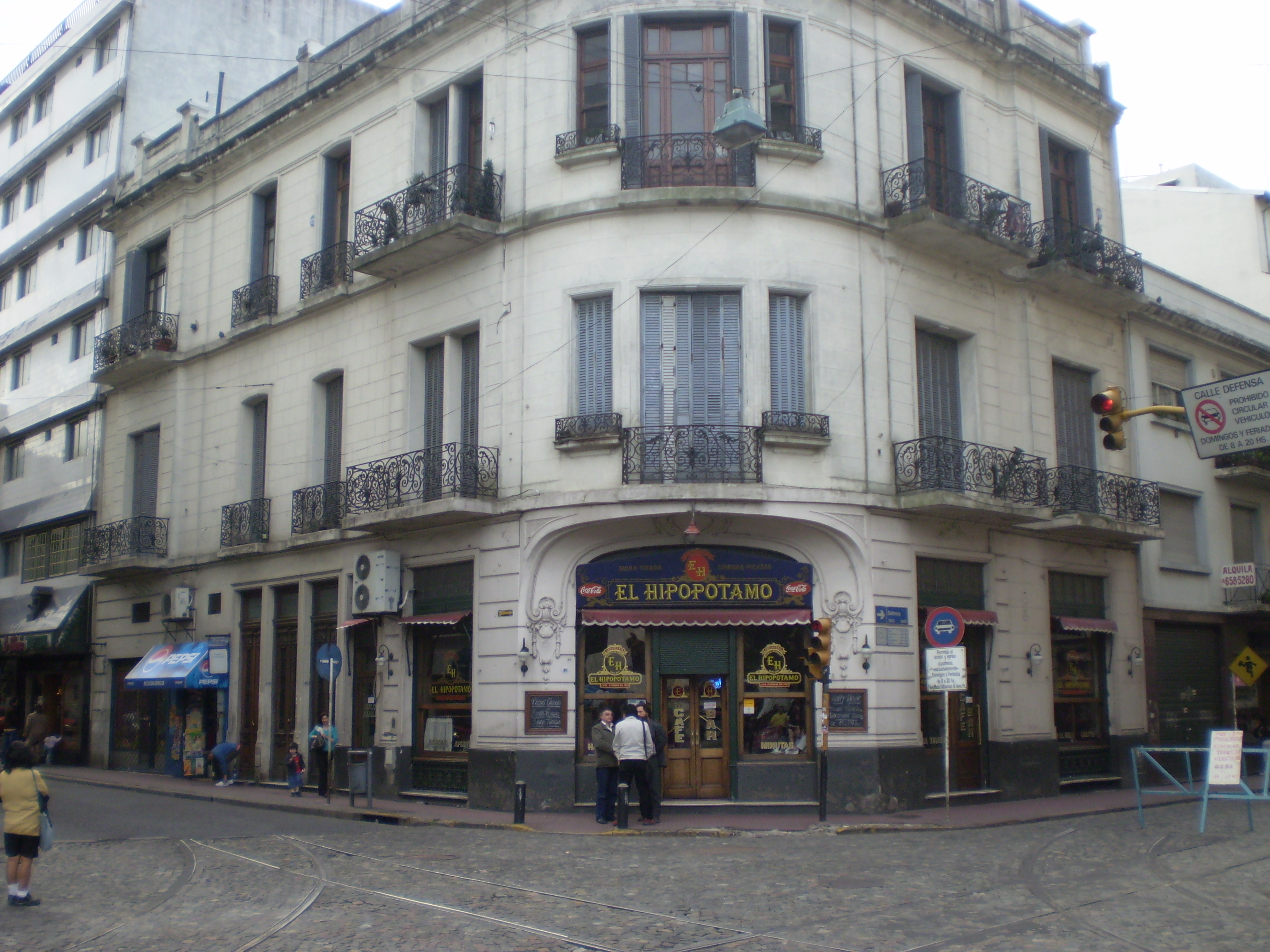
Hippopotamus Café

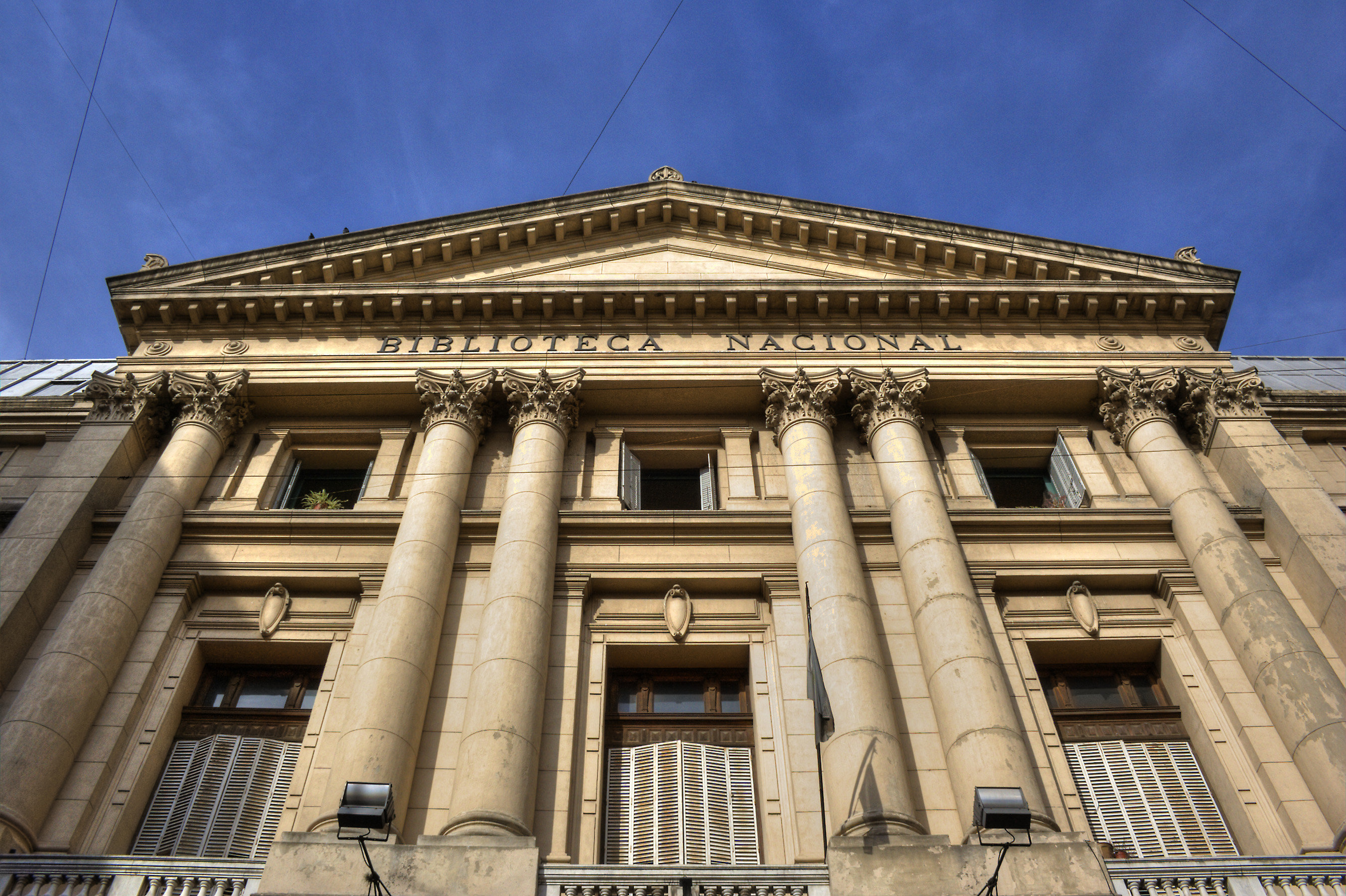
Former National Library of the Argentine Republic building on Mexico Street

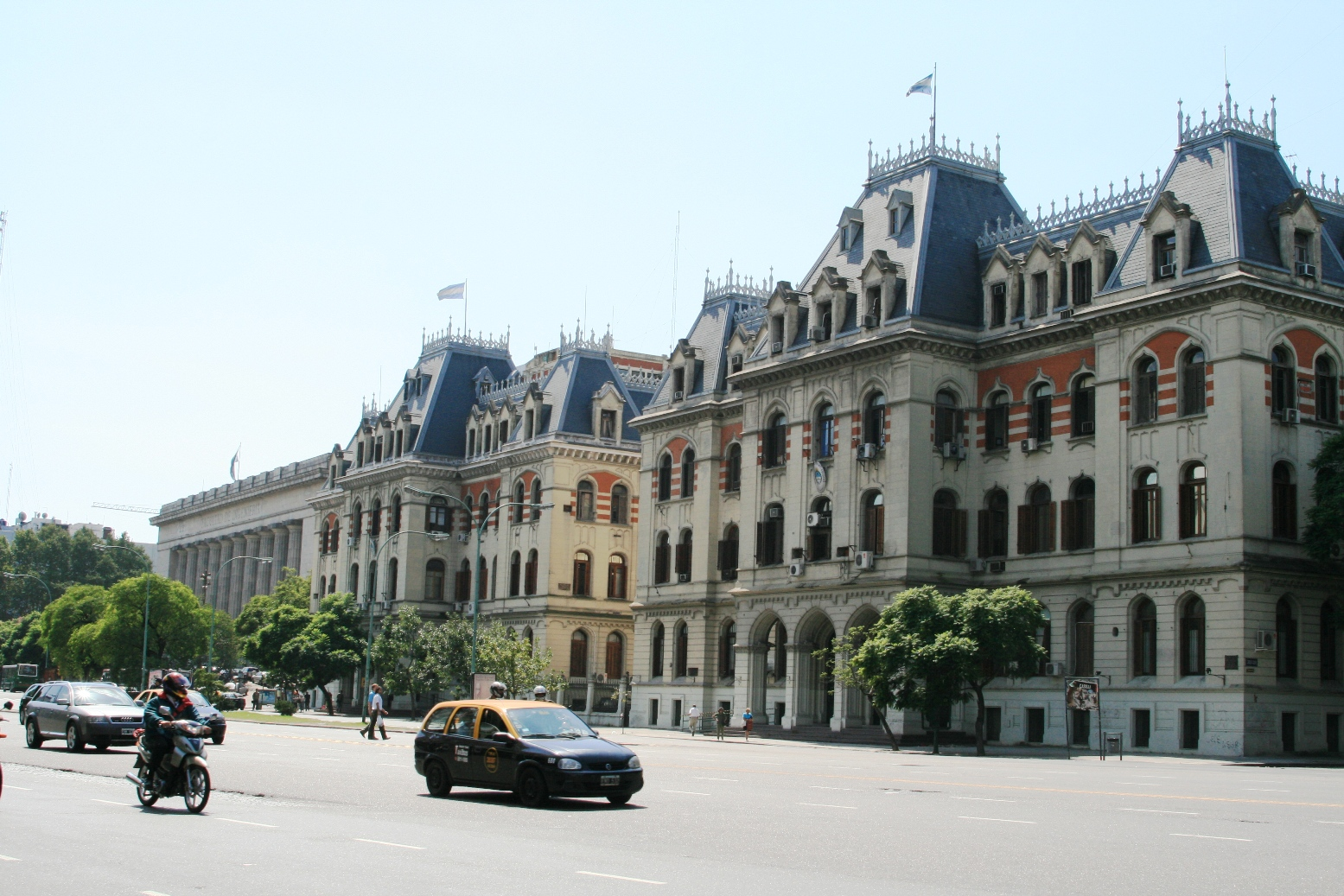
Ministry of Agriculture

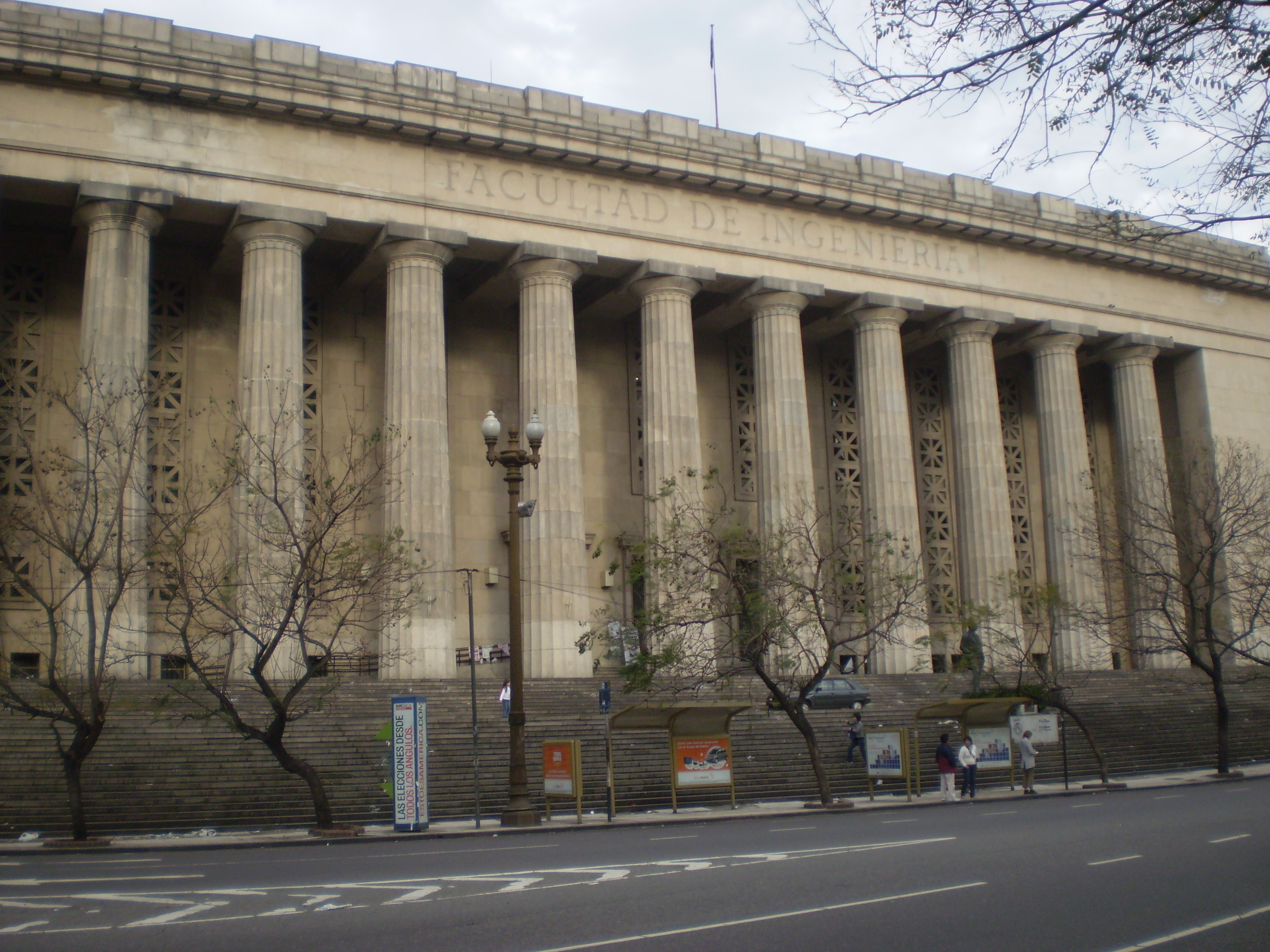
University of Buenos Aires Faculty of Engineering

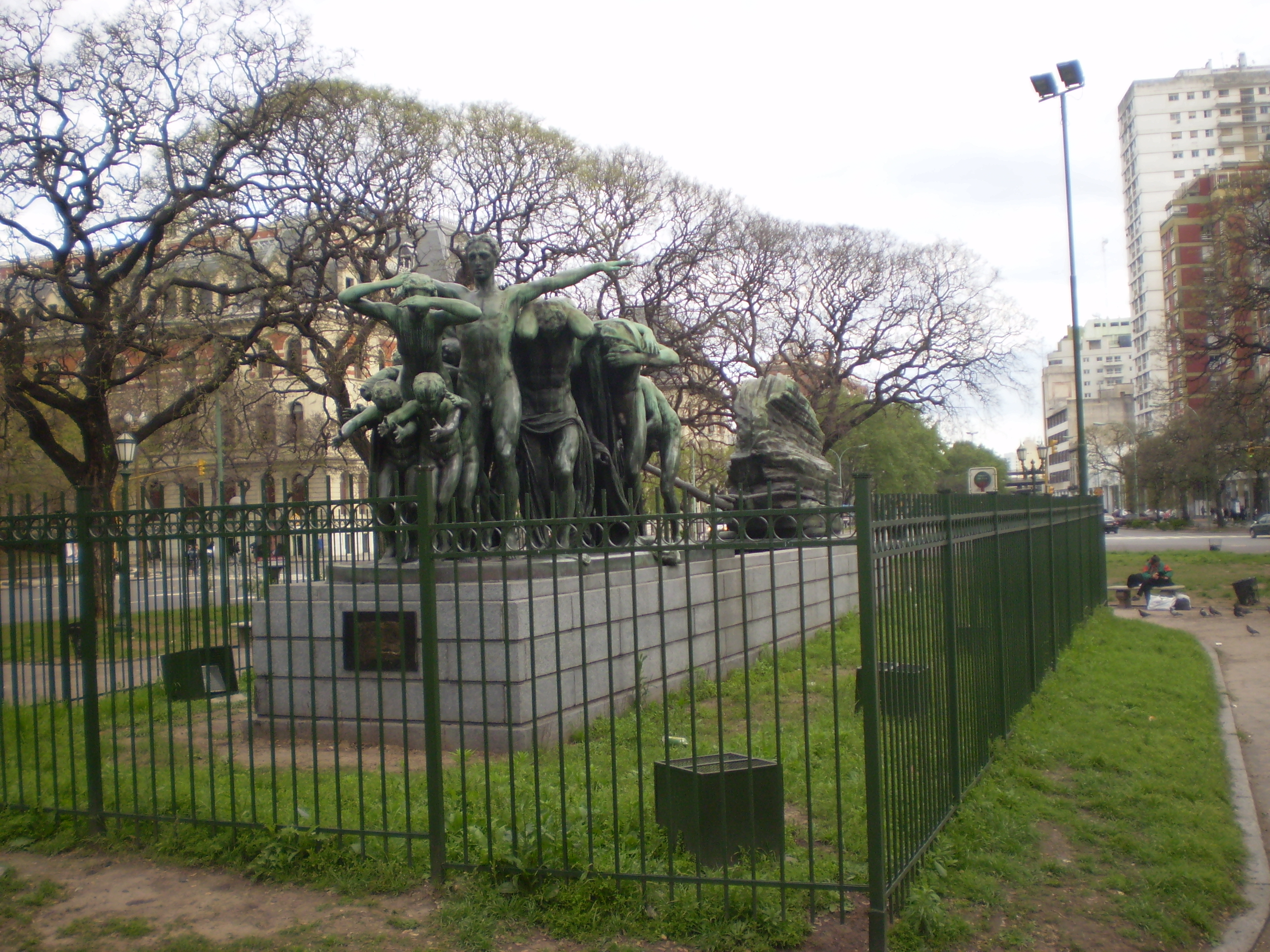
Ode to Labour (Rogelio Yrurtia, 1927)

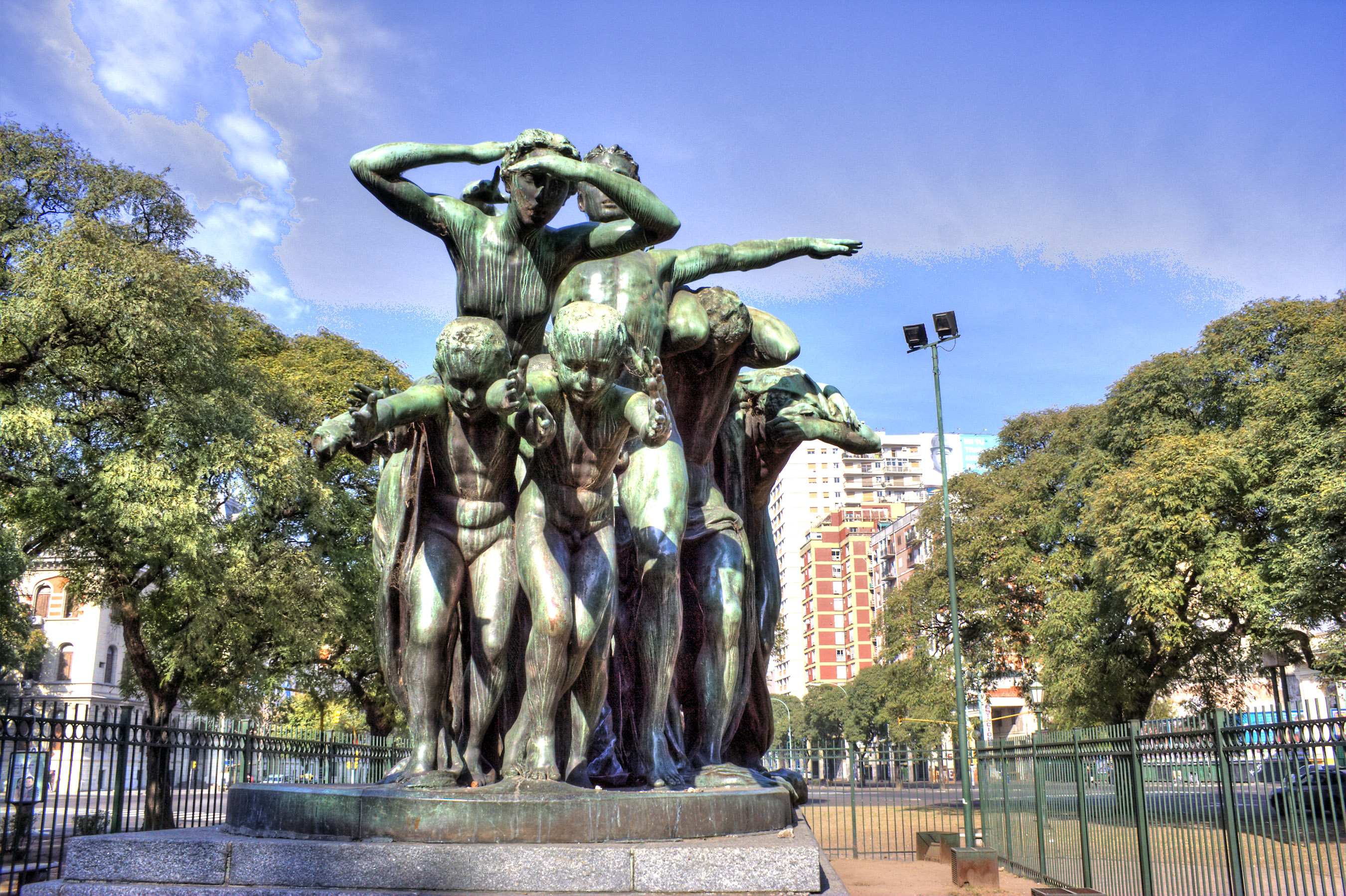
Front view of "Canto al trabajo"

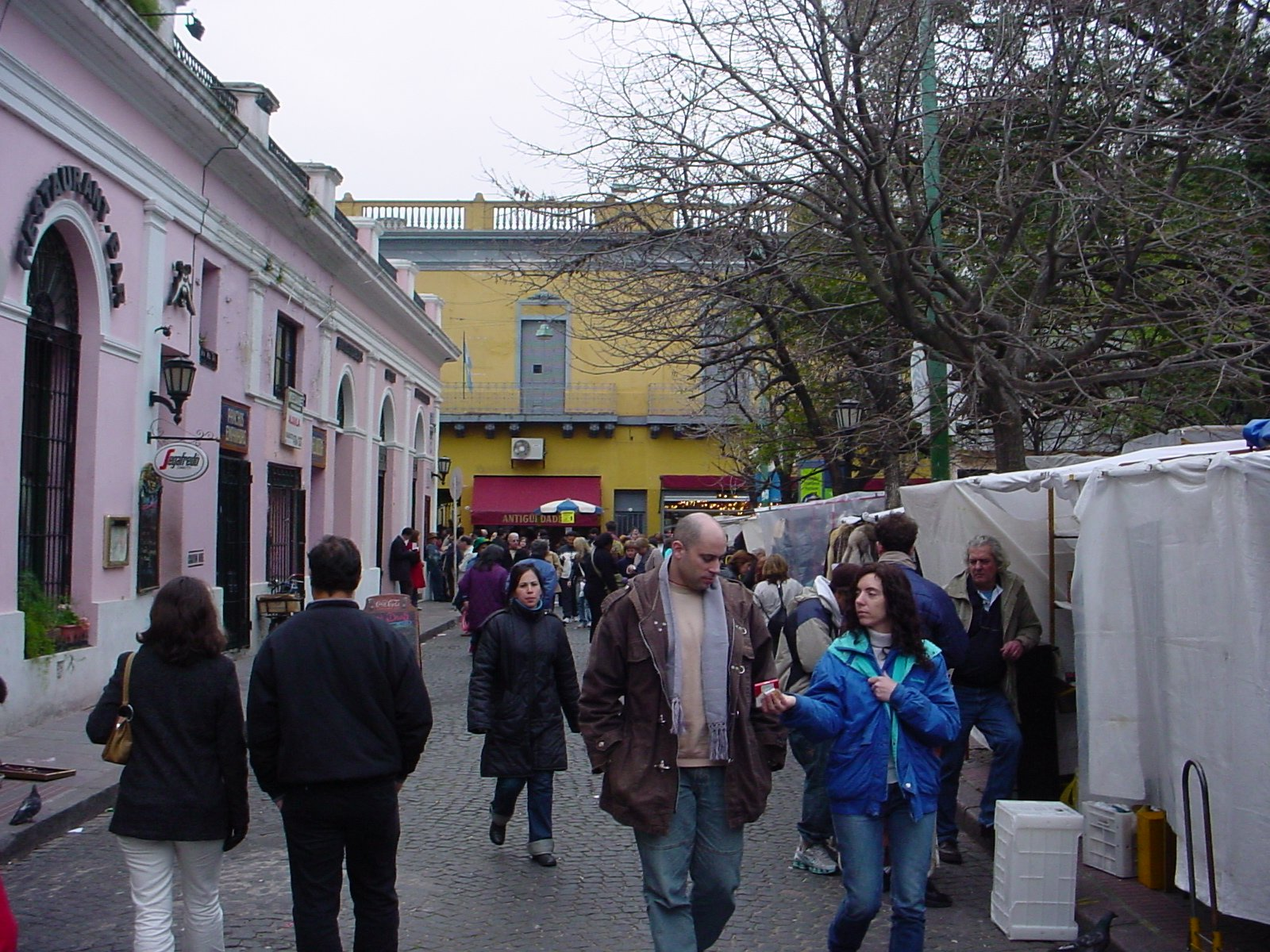
San Telmo Fair

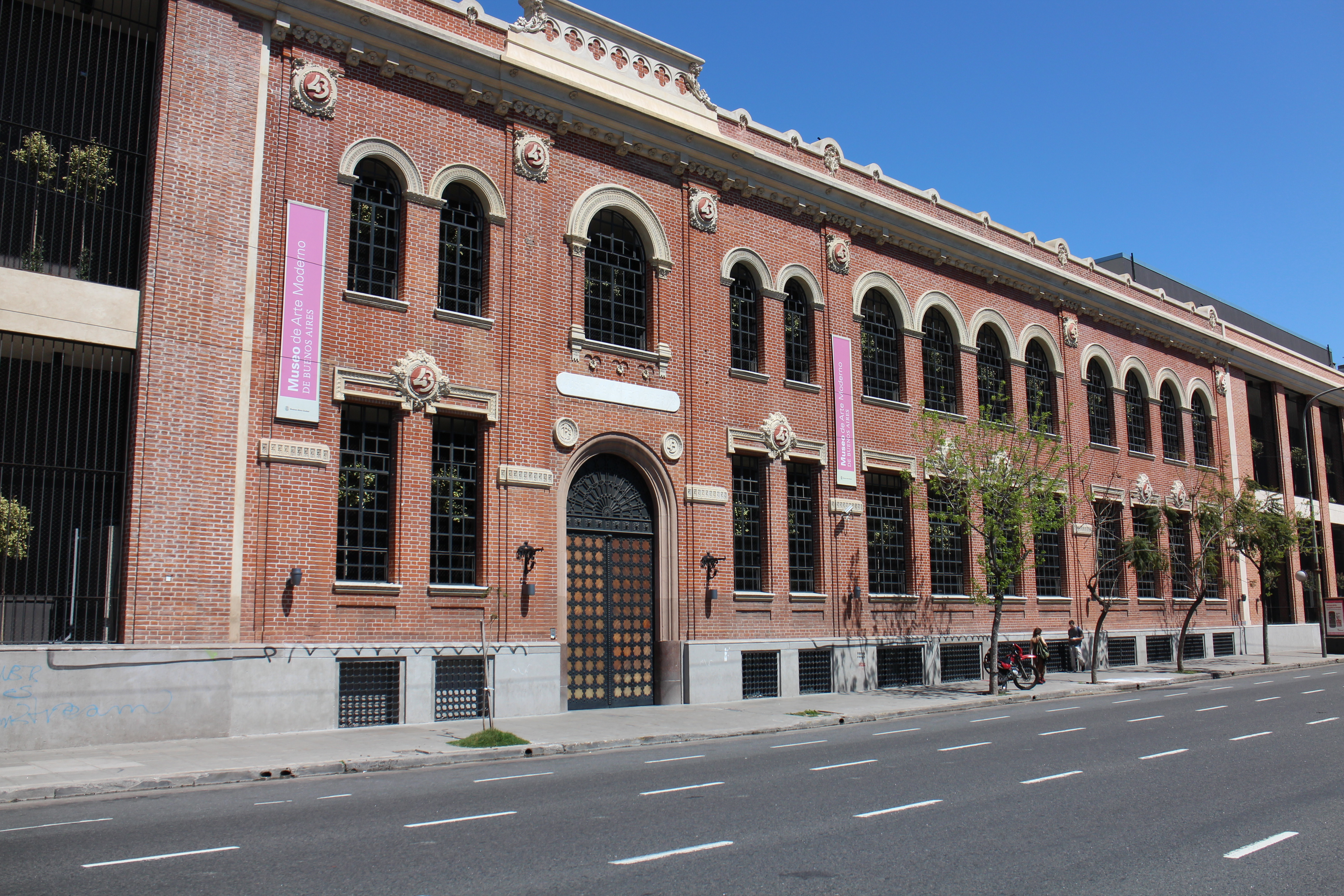
Museum of Modern Art

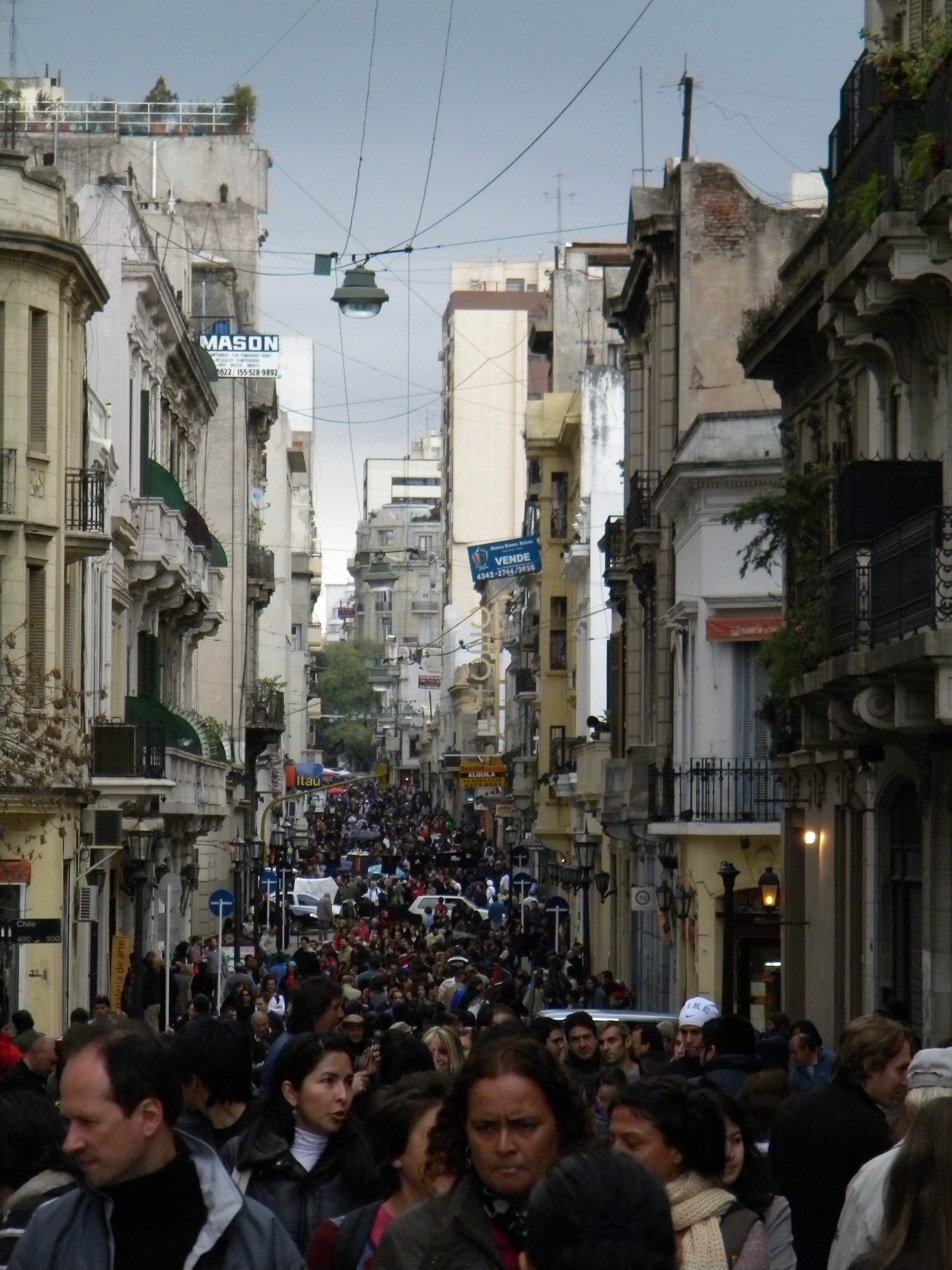
Defensa Street

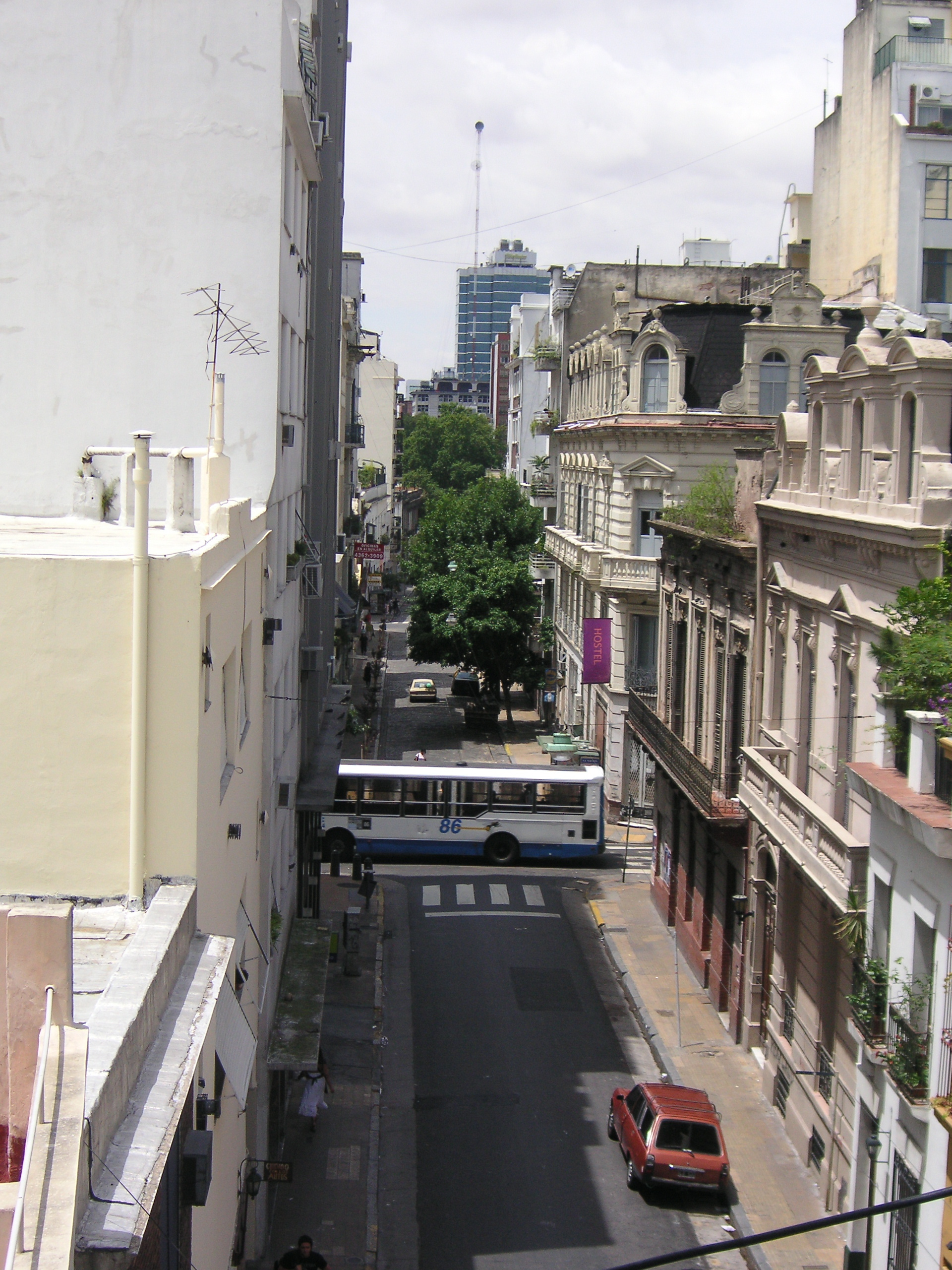
Chile Street

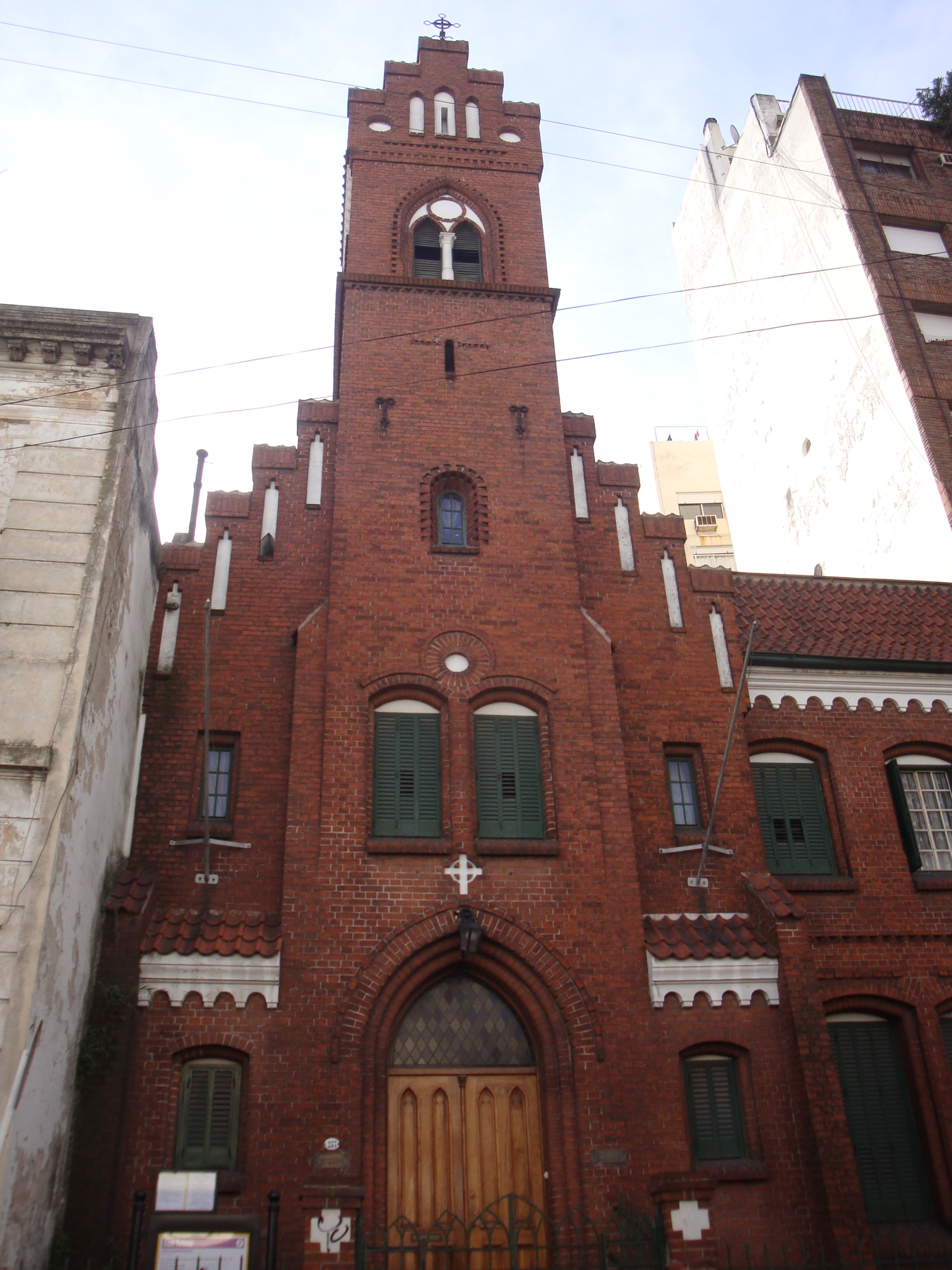
Iglesia Dinamarquesa of San Telmo
