= Appetite (art gallery) =

Appetite (stylized as APPETITE) was a gallery and artist-run space, founded by Daniela Luna, in the neighborhood of San Telmo, Buenos Aires, Argentina. Its mission was to showcase and promote new artists. It sometimes courted controversy, before closing in mid-2011.

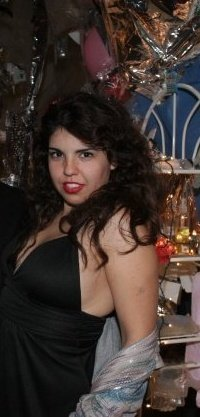
Daniela Luna, founder of Appetite (art gallery)

== History ==
Established in 2005 by Daniela Luna, Appetite generated considerable interest in the neighborhood of San Telmo, transforming its area into a prominent contemporary art district of Buenos Aires.

It quickly became known for its new artists and its openings and parties. The New York Times described it as "an irreverent, punk-inflected gallery in San Telmo started by Daniela Luna, a feisty 30-year-old known for her shrewd eye and cool parties."

In mid-2010 Appetite closed the doors of its three Buenos Aires spaces, as Daniela Luna moved to Beijing, China.

== Overseas presence ==
=== New York ===
In 2008 and 2009 Appetite had a branch in Bushwick, Brooklyn, where it organized exhibitions and events. It had appearances in New York art fairs, including Pinta Art Show, where The New York Times claimed: "For once, a fair looks like an art exhibition, not a job-lot display. And when a booth is crowded, the pieces can be blamed, as is the case at Appetite, a gallery with branches in Buenos Aires and Brooklyn that shows young artists working in an accumulative mode."

=== London ===
Appetite was the first Argentinian gallery to be accepted at Frieze Art Fair, where it received attention from the press and public, and generated controversies due to their use of the global economic crisis as a subject for the stand. The New York Times wrote: "With first-time exhibitors from China, Turkey, India and Argentina (from Buenos Aires, Appetite, where the work of about 10 artists is displayed in a kind of continuous trash heap), Frieze still managed to provide a random snapshot of an increasingly global and youthful art world in transition."

=== Vilnius ===
Appetite was invited to participate in the fair Art Vilnius 09, where they were nominated for best stand. While in Vilnius, Daniela Luna performed at the Vilnius Graphic Art Center and held a video screening from Argentinian artists.

=== Milan ===
In April 2008 it was part of the group of galleries presented to the fair MiArt by the name of FOCUS BUENOS AIRES. Local newspaper La Nación announced: (From Spanish) "With consortium format and cooperative spirit, a group of Buenos Aires galleries with the support of the minister of culture, Hernán Lombardi, and the curatorship of Adriana Forconi and Florencia Braga Menéndez, celebrated the opening of MiArt edition 13th." APPETITE participation at this fair was noticed by the New York Times as well: "Appetite gallery will get additional exposure in Milan when the contemporary art fair, MiArt 2008, spotlights emerging Buenos Aires artists in April. Adriana Forconi, a jet-settling consultant to the art fair, was in town recently to scout for worthy galleries, and was struck by what she calls the city’s 'frenetic and blissfully chaotic' pace."

=== Beijing ===
In March 2011, Daniela Luna opened an Appetite space in Beijing, China at 798 Art Zone. The space moved to Caochangdi in November 2011. Luna also worked between Beijing and Hong Kong on research and writing about Chinese art. Part of this research can be seen as a four pages spread published by Argentinian magazine DMag.

== Side projects ==
=== War Club ===
War Club was an underground party that started in 2008 in a secret warehouse that guests could access with a password. The club mixed underground DJs and bands, with site specific art interventions and performance. As described in Time Out, "Arty meets party at Daniela Luna's WarClub. Surrounded by cutting edge wall art, intellectuals and club kids, artists and collectors, the young and the old make up an eclectic smiling crowd. WarClub is the brainchild of enfant terrible art gallerist Daniela Luna. It has taken place, up until now, in this raw, industrial, multi-room space whose only modifications, in the punk spirit Luna most prizes, are an accumulation of graffiti, murals and installations."

=== Tanto Deseo ===
Tanto Deseo is a concept store and exhibition space for erotic art and objects that has functioned in the area of San Telmo since 2006. Tanto Deseo was featured as cover story and spread throughout an issue of Les Inrockuptibles: (From Spanish) "Without any doubt, one of the present oasis is Tanto Deseo, an erotic-artistic branch from APPETITE gallery, mothership of young art commanded by Daniela Luna. Tanto Deseo is an experimental essay, where pulsions are expressed under different topics." It won the "Revelation Award" at the Puro Diseño fair in 2008. A cultural site, Leedor, writes of it: "Appetite and Tanto Deseo, two galleries with young spirit, that intent to give a space of creation without the market's demands interfering, born from a personal necessity mixed with the feeling that things like these were missing in this city. Participants and winners of the Revelation Award at the fair 'Puro Diseño' some days ago."

== Controversies ==
Appetite was censured or fined in different occasions, mainly due to their usual content of sex, violence, or critics to political and economical issues.

One such controversy took place in 2008 when 10 artists abruptly decided to leave the gallery. According to Clarin, an Argentinian newspaper: (from Spanish) "Personality cult or misunderstanding? For Luna and possibly for the virtuous scene of young artists that she leads, there is an inflection point post-Frieze. By the end of last year, ten of them disassociated themselves from Appetite. While many local media celebrated the gallery's arrival to Frieze, they talked about her curves, her history, and compared her to a diva."

Rafael Cippollini, one of the most notable critics from Argentina, wrote in newspaper La Nación (from Spanish) "In a horizon in which the most celebrated references of this first decade are already history, it becomes necessary to revise a peculiar trajectory such as Appetite gallery, in all its brilliant, polemic and flamboyant edges. A meteoric rise, the consequent excessive over expansion - multiple ventures in Buenos Aires, New York, London - and finally, an explosion that led to the dismissal of a substantial part of its staff : the risky and vertiginous bet by Daniela Luna, counter to the cautious times that punctuate our institutions, is as unprecedented and singular in our environment."
