= Feria de San Telmo =

Antique fair that takes place in barrio of San Telmo

Coordinates: 34°37′13.2″S 58°22′17.2″W

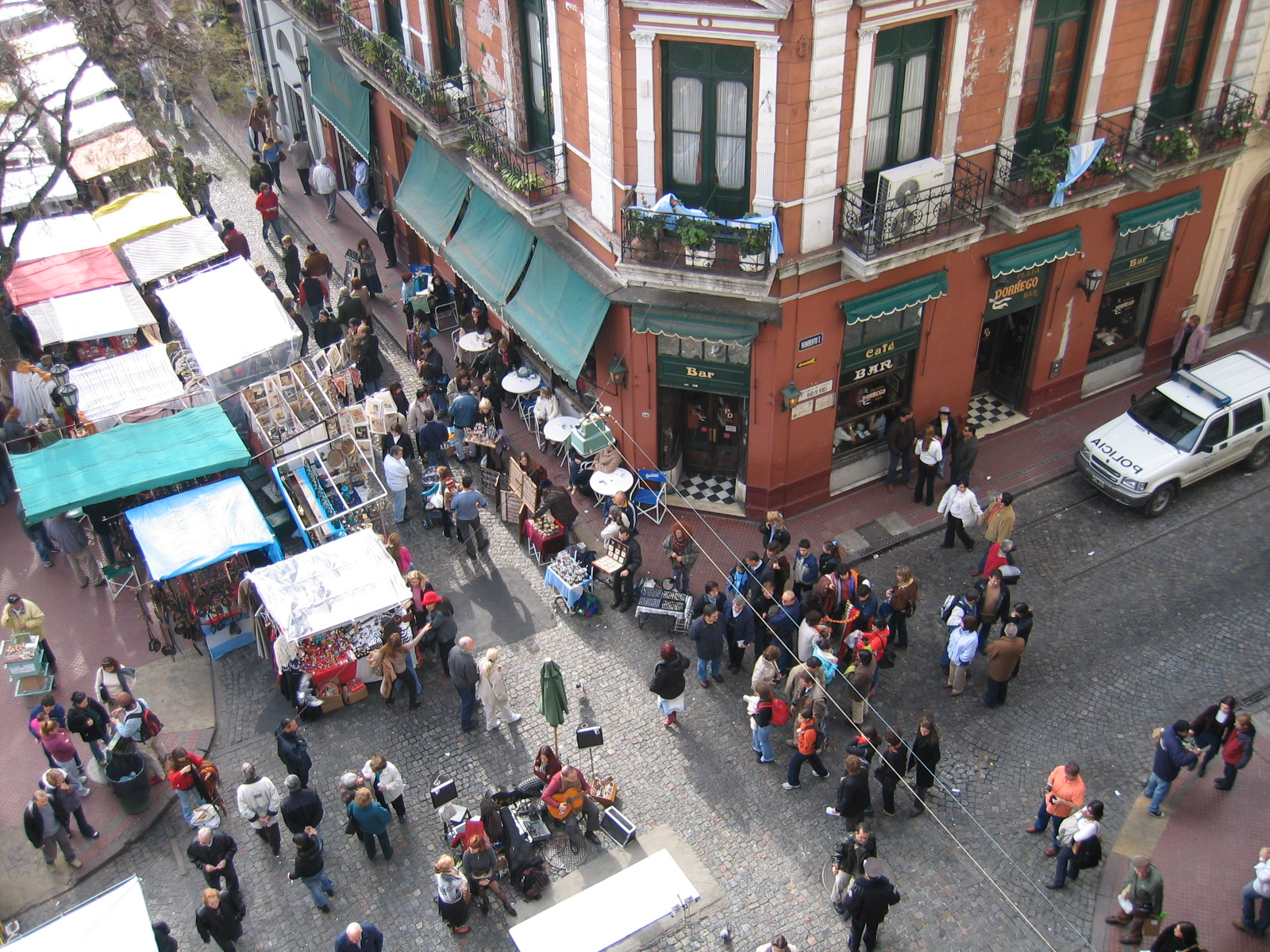
View to the southern side of the fair.

Feria de San Telmo (Spanish: San Telmo Fair) is an antique fair that takes place in the barrio (neighbourhood) of San Telmo, in Buenos Aires, Argentina. It was created in 1970 by architect José María Peña.

The fair is composed of 270 stands. It is located in Plaza Dorrego and runs every Sunday from 10 am to 4 pm. It is visited by 10,000 people every Sunday; the majority are tourists from all over the world. On the streets, you can see tango shows and orchestra playing for all visitors. Also you can buy typical food from the restaurants or informal sellers. However the main attraction in this Feria is the antiques and cultural items offered.
