= Iglesia Dinamarquesa of San Telmo =

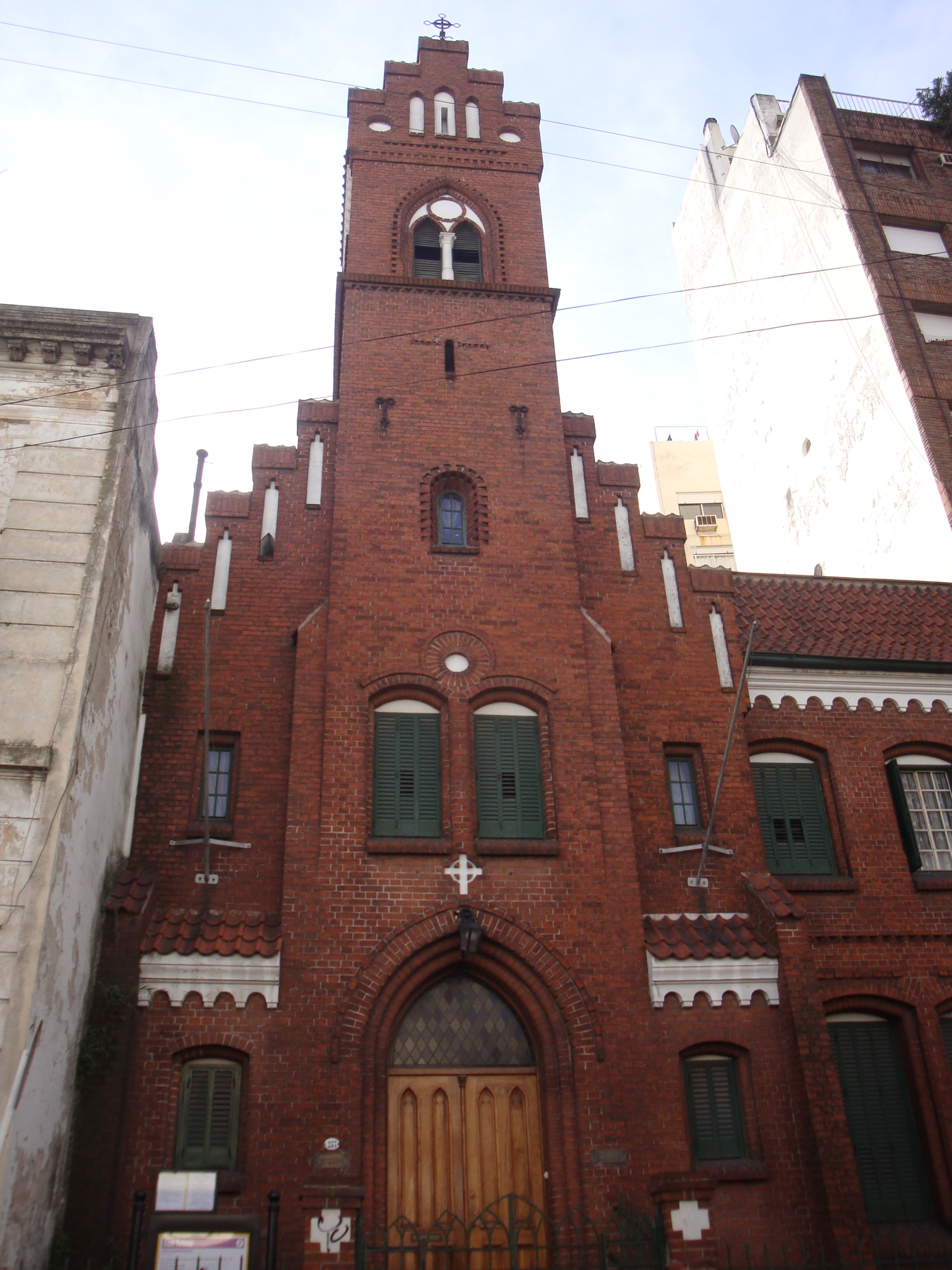
- view of the Danish Church of San Telmo

Religion
- Affiliation: Lutheranism
- Rite: Protestant

Location
- Location: Carlos Calvo 257, San Telmo, Buenos Aires
- Country: Argentina
- Interactive map of Iglesia Dinamarquesa of San Telmo

Architecture
- Architect: Morten Rönnow
- Type: neo-Gothic
- Established: 1929
- Completed: 1931

Iglesia Dinamarquesa of San Telmo (in English: Danish Church of San Telmo) is a Christian temple located in the neighborhood of San Telmo, city of Buenos Aires. It was the work of the Danish architect Morten Rönnow, who completed the construction in 1931.

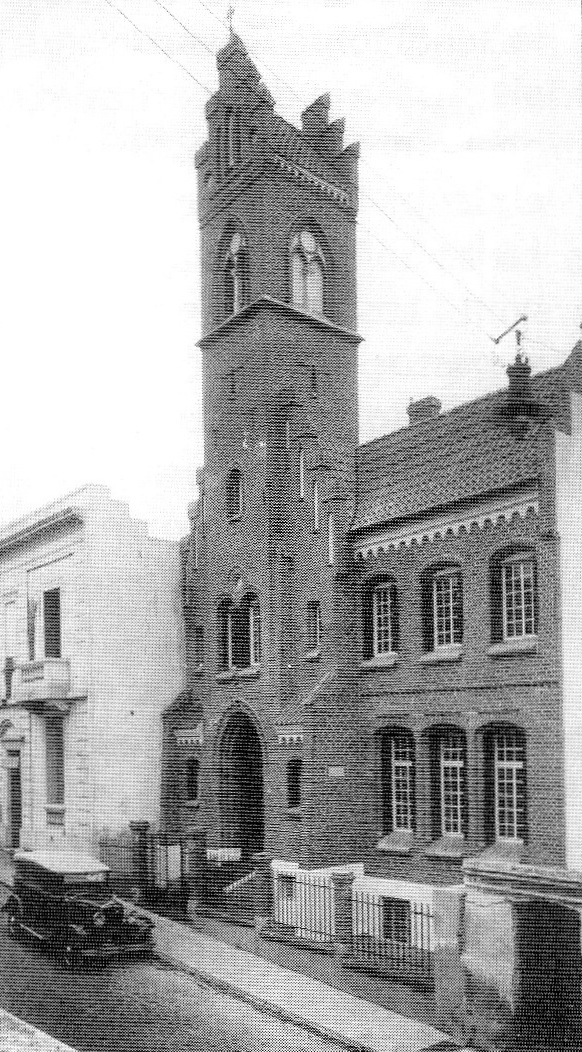
The Danish Church of San Telmo in 1931.
