= Plaza Dorrego =

Square in Buenos Aires, Argentina

Coordinates: 34°37′14″S 58°22′18″W

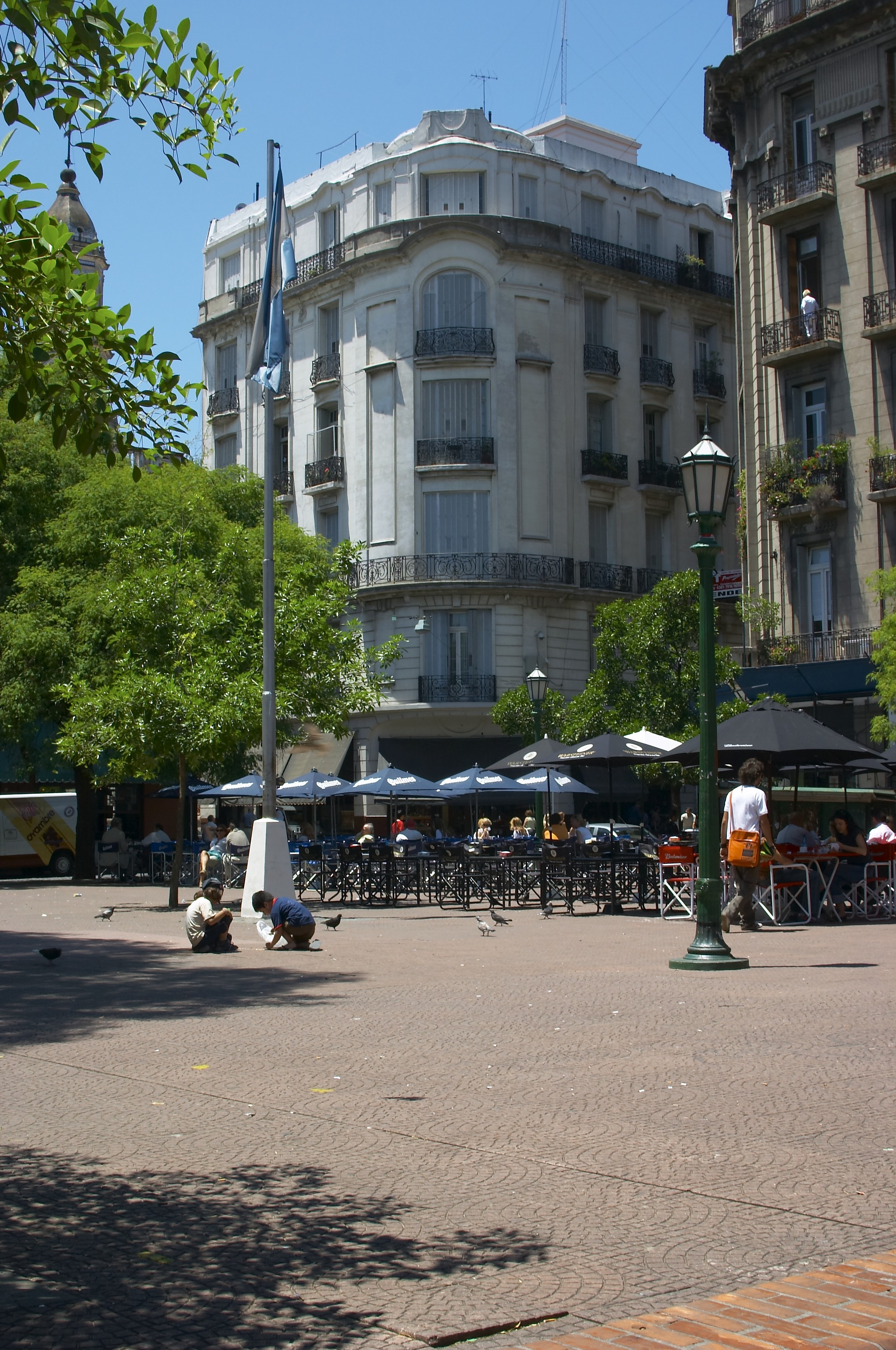
Plaza Dorrego

Plaza Dorrego (Spanish: Dorrego Square) is a square located in the heart of San Telmo, in Buenos Aires, Argentina. In the 19th century, San Telmo was the main residential barrio (neighbourhood) of the city and Plaza Dorrego was its focal point.

In the past it was referred to as Hueco del Alto or Alto de la carretas as it was the place where wagons would stop before crossing the Tercero del Sur stream (today called Pasaje San Lorenzo) on their way downtown. The name had been Alto de San Pedro and later changed to Plaza del Comercio in 1822. In 1905, the name was changed once again to its current form.

The buildings located in the square maintain its original design thanks to the help of the Comisión del Museo de la Ciudad.

Currently, its surroundings are full of cafes, bars and pubs, which fill the square with tables from those shops. There are also several antique stores. Musicians and dancers particularly tango exhibitions are seen, like the Argentine tango. The Feria de San Telmo (San Telmo Fair), mainly of antiques, runs every Sunday.

Plaza Dorrego is located at the intersection of Humberto Primero and Defensa streets. Along with La Boca, Recoleta, Florida Street, and others, the Plaza Dorrego is one of the main tourist attractions of Buenos Aires.

== Gallery ==
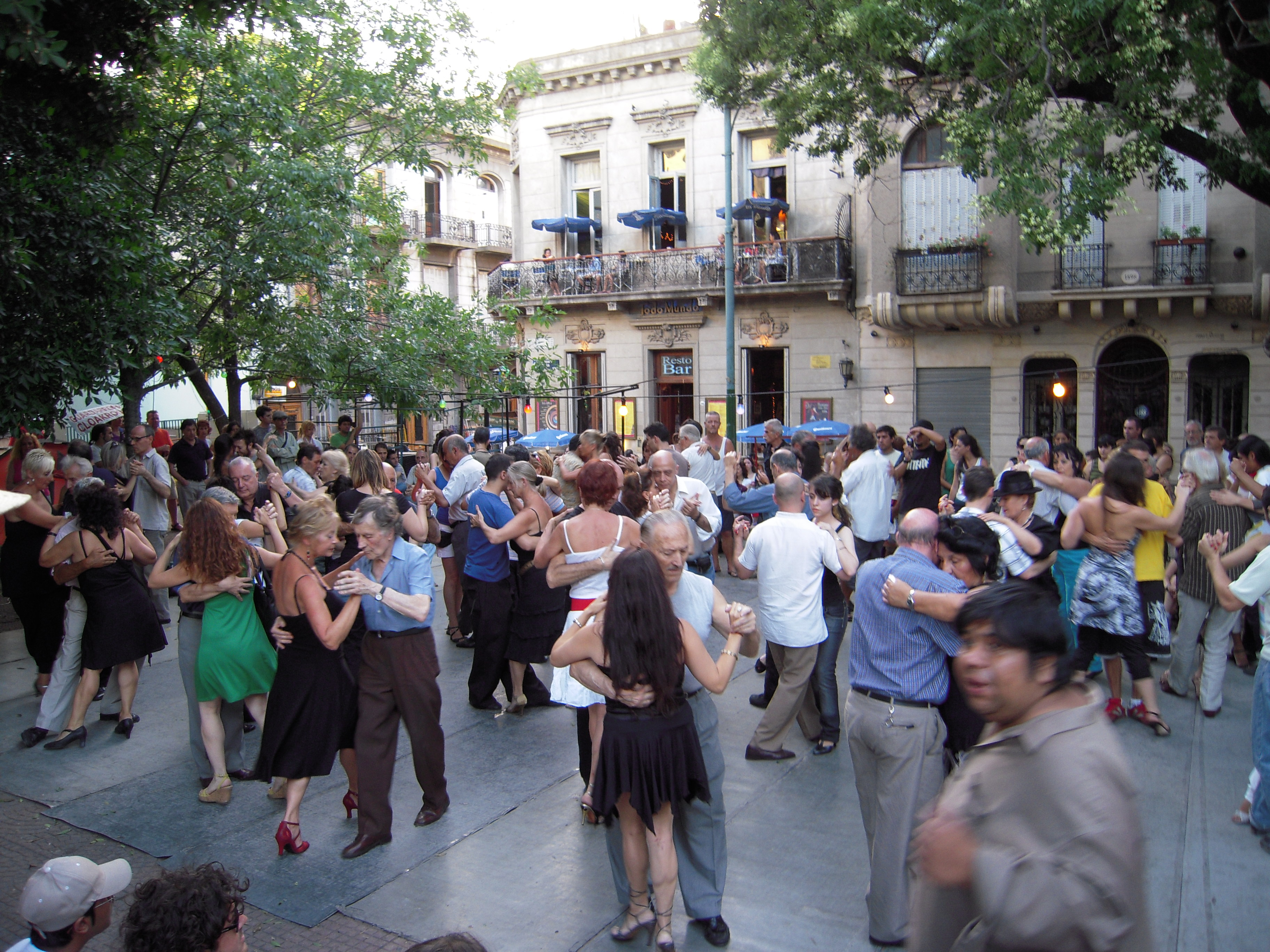
Sunday afternoon tango at Plaza Dorrego

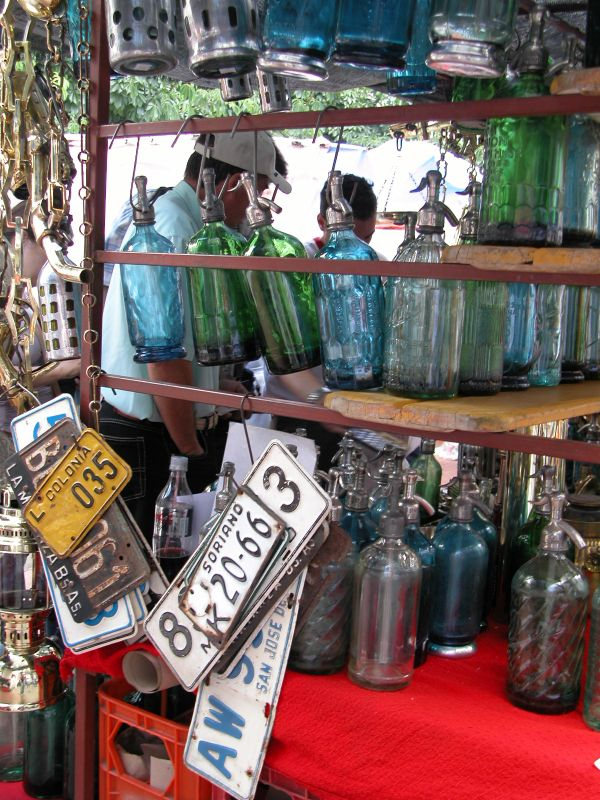
Antiques Fair at the plaza
