= Argentine Korean =

Argentine Korean or Korean Argentine may be:

- Of or relating to Argentina–North Korea relations
- Of or relating to Argentina–South Korea relations
- Argentines in North Korea
- Argentines in South Korea
- Koreans in Argentina
