= Argentina–Guatemala relations =

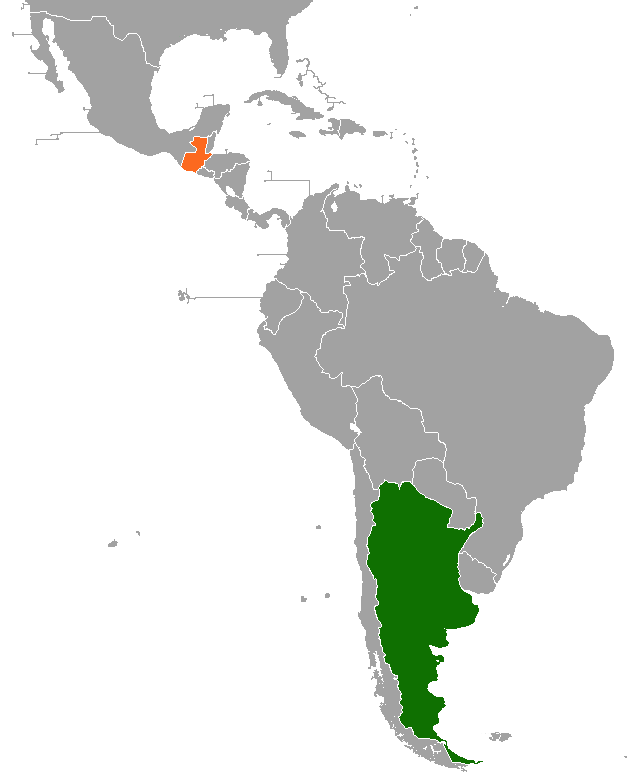
- Argentina: Guatemala

Diplomatic relations between the Argentine Republic and the Republic of Guatemala have existed for over a century. Both nations are members of the Community of Latin American and Caribbean States, Group of 77, Organization of American States, Organization of Ibero-American States, and the United Nations.

== History ==
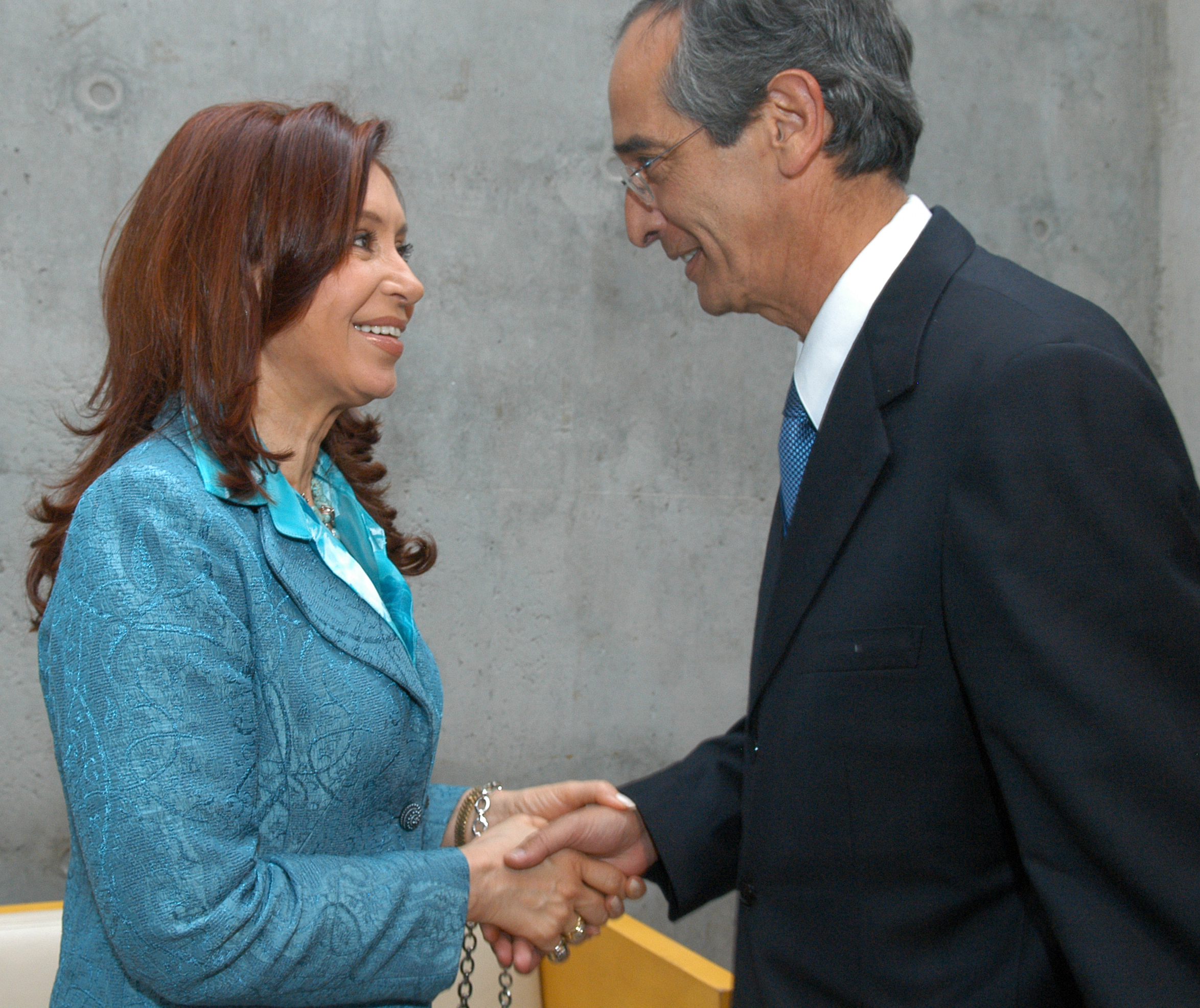
Argentine President Cristina Fernández de Kirchner and Guatemalan President Álvaro Colom; 2007.

Both Argentina and Guatemala share a common history as former territories of the Spanish Empire. During the Spanish colonial period, Argentina was part of the Viceroyalty of Peru before later becoming part of the Viceroyalty of the Río de la Plata, while Guatemala was governed under the Viceroyalty of New Spain. On July 9, 1816, Argentina declared its independence from Spain, while Guatemala gained independence in 1821 as part of the Federal Republic of Central America. On October 7, 1918, both nations established diplomatic relations.

During Argentina's military dictatorship (1976–1983), the Argentine government played a key role in supporting the Guatemalan government in its fight against left-wing insurgents. As part of Operation Charly, a covert intelligence and counterinsurgency initiative backed by the CIA, Argentina provided military training, intelligence support, and weapons to the Guatemalan regime. Argentine military advisors, many of them veterans of the Dirty War, trained Guatemalan security forces in interrogation techniques, counterinsurgency warfare, and political repression.

Argentine involvement in Guatemala intensified in 1980, with military personnel from Argentina assisting in counterinsurgency operations, including urban assassinations carried out by the 'Secret Anti-communist Army' (ESA) during the Lucas García regime. Argentine advisors also participated in rural counteroffensives, such as "Operation Ash 81" in 1981. The notorious Batallón de Inteligencia 601 worked alongside Guatemalan death squads, employing similar tactics used in Argentina's own repression.

Argentina also facilitated the training of Guatemalan officers both domestically and abroad. In 1981, a secret accord between the Guatemalan government and the Argentine military junta formalized this collaboration, sending 200 Guatemalan officers to Buenos Aires for advanced military intelligence training. Argentine advisors also trained Guatemalan personnel in Honduras, as corroborated by defectors from Battalion 3-16, a Honduran intelligence unit involved in disappearances.

In addition to training, Argentina supplied the Guatemalan military with Israeli-made weapons and other military equipment throughout the late 1970s and early 1980s. However, Argentine involvement in Guatemala, along with its broader support for Central American regimes, largely ended following Argentina's defeat in the Falklands War in 1982.

In 2018, both nations celebrate 100 years of diplomatic relations.

== Resident diplomatic missions ==
- Argentina has an embassy in Guatemala City.
- Guatemala has an embassy in Buenos Aires.
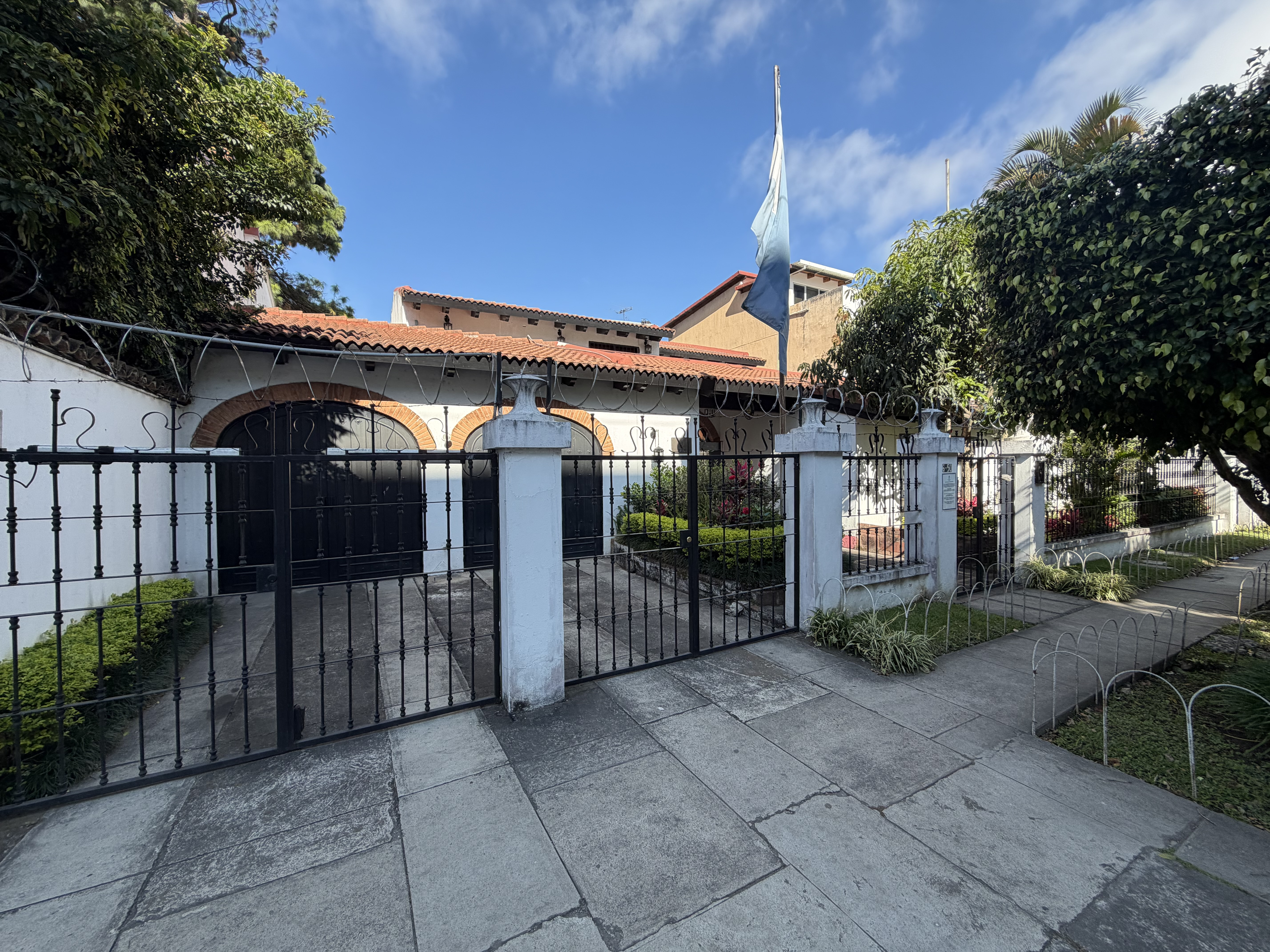
Embassy of Argentina in Guatemala City

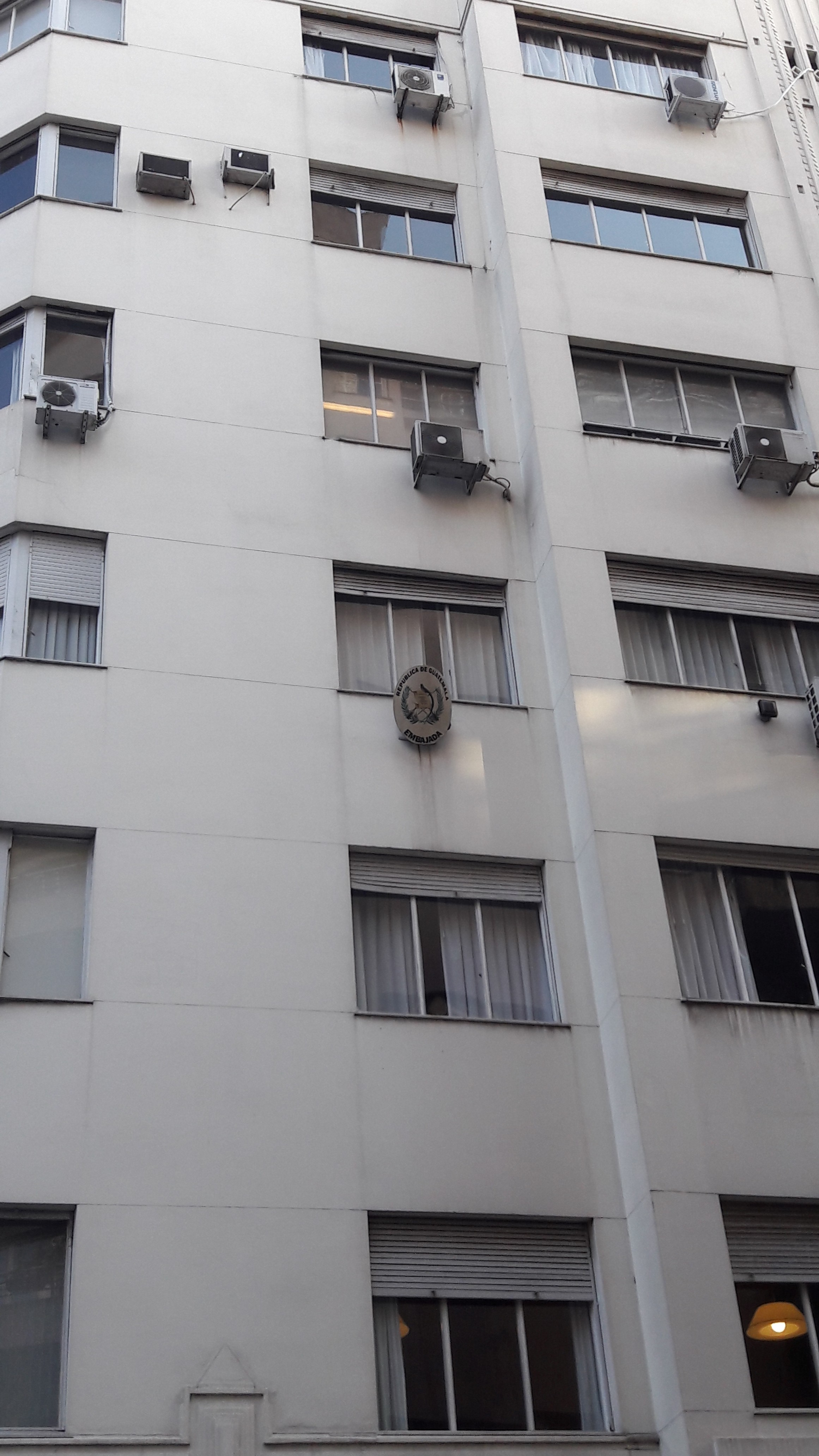
Embassy of Guatemala in Buenos Aires

== See also ==
- Foreign relations of Argentina
- Foreign relations of Guatemala
- Guatemalan Civil War
