= Argentina–Libya relations =

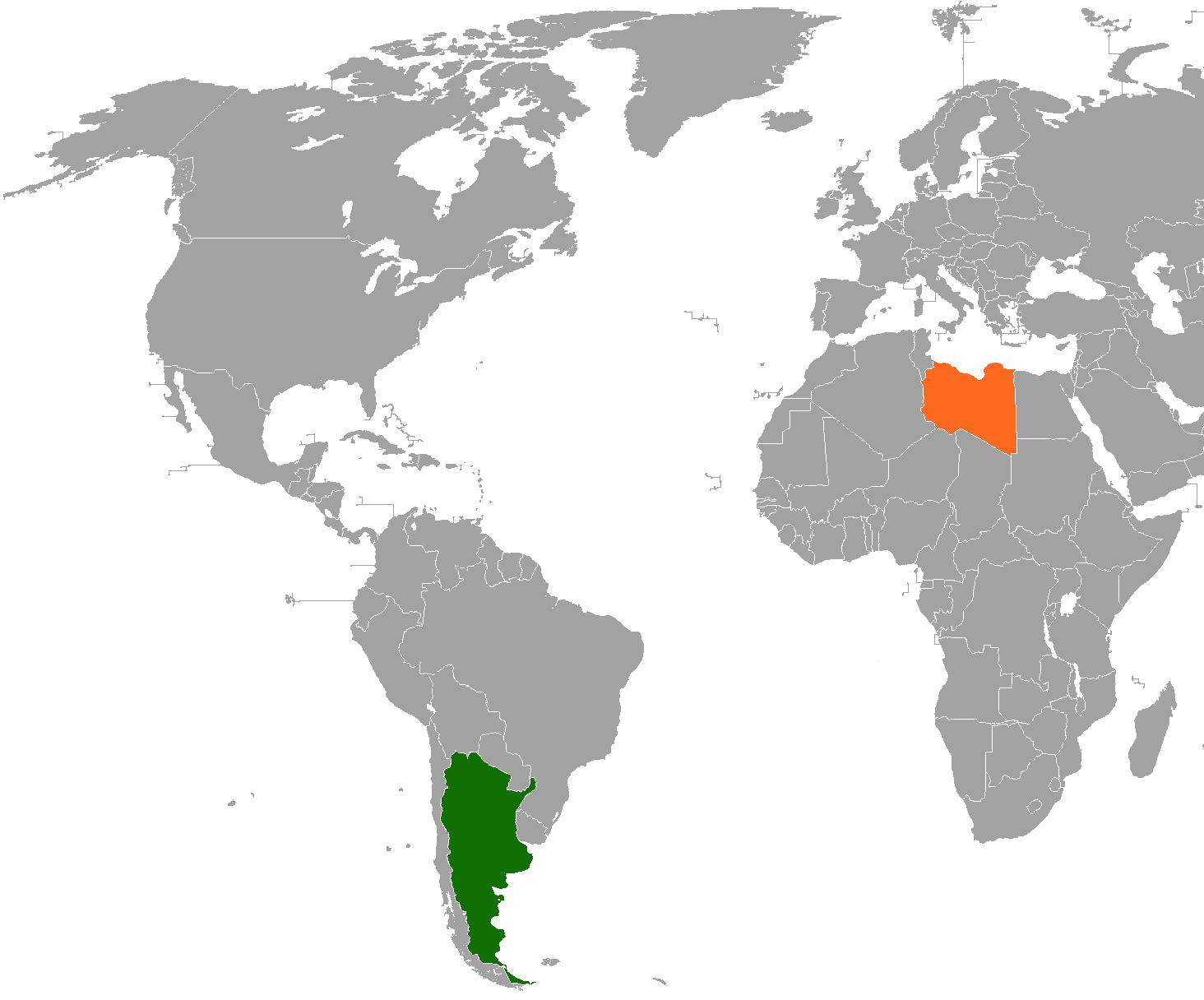

- Argentina: Libya

Argentina–Libya relations are the bilateral relations between Argentine Republic and Libya. The two countries are members of the Group of 77 and the United Nations.

== History ==
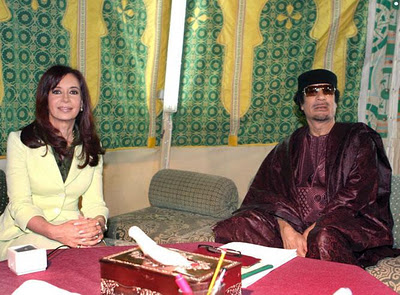
Muammar Gaddafi (right) meeting the President of Argentina, Cristina Fernández de Kirchner (left) in Tripoli in 2008

In January 1974, the Argentine President Juan Perón sent his Minister of Social Welfare, José López Rega, on a diplomatic mission to Libya, where he met with Muammar al-Gaddafi, with whom Perón shared an ideological affinity, close to Nasserism and Third Worldism. As a result of this visit, several cooperation agreements are signed, related to economic, technological and cultural issues. Among these agreements was one where Argentina would share their experience in the finding and refinement of uranium with Libya. Note that at this time, neither country was a signatory to the global Nuclear Non-Proliferation Treaty. In February of that same year, the government printed a small publication on excellent quality photographic paper in Spanish and Arabic, called "Argentine Mission in Libya", with a brief review of the result of the visit and the treaties that were signed.

Libya provided US$100 million in arms to Argentina during the Falklands War (1982). This was followed by an Argentine delegation visiting Libya to discuss providing nuclear materials and arms to Libya. By 1984, Argentina could be said to be openly assisting Libya in its pursuit of nuclear weapons.

To give continuity to the bilateral cooperation objectives agreed with Libya following the visit of the President of the Nation, Cristina Fernández de Kirchner at the end of 2008 –accompanied by Foreign Minister Jorge Taiana, delegations from Argentina and Libya held a three-day meeting Libyan Leader Muammar Gaddafi, with the aim of implementing a joint work program in different fields.

== After Libyan Civil War ==
Argentina votes in favor of the accreditation of the National Transitional Council as a representative of Libya for the 66th Ordinary Session of the UN General Assembly, recognizing that entity as a legitimate representative of the Libyan people.

Argentina closed its embassy in Tripoli due the First Libyan civil war, and its reopened in 2012, in 2018 due Second Libyan civil war Argentina closed its embassy in Tripoli and is temporarily transferred to Tunis.

In 2019, A delegation from the Libyan Ministry of Foreign Affairs, headed by the Director of the Americas Affairs Department, Abdul Rahman Al-Qannas, met with the Director of the Africa and Middle East Department of the Argentine Ministry of Foreign Affairs, Mariano Simon Padros.

Specialists in bilateral relations and international cooperation from both sides participated in the meeting, which was held at the headquarters of the Argentine Ministry of Foreign Affairs in the capital, Buenos Aires, in the presence of the Chargé d'Affairs of the Libyan Embassy in Argentina, Bashir Al-Akkari.

The discussions focused on ways to consolidate political relations and expand the horizons of cooperation between the two countries, and included areas of exchange of support and coordination in international and regional organizations, enhancing trade and economic exchange in the health and education sectors, and possible cooperation in the field of removing mines and war remnants, in addition to facilitating the granting of visas to Libyan citizens. Especially students and businessmen. The two sides agreed to continue making efforts to overcome difficulties in order to expand cooperation in the aforementioned areas, and to encourage the flow of goods and services according to the needs of the Libyan market, and in a way that serves the common benefit. Arrangements related to Libya’s participation in the United Nations high-level meeting for South-South cooperation.

== Resident diplomatic missions ==
- Libya has an embassy in Buenos Aires.
- Argentina is accredited to Libya from its embassy in Tunis.

== See also ==
- Foreign relations of Argentina
- List of diplomatic missions in Argentina
- List of diplomatic missions of Argentina
- Foreign relations of Libya
- List of diplomatic missions of Libya
- List of diplomatic missions in Libya

== Bibliography ==
=== Sources ===
- Spector, Leonard S. (1984). Nuclear Proliferation Today (1st ed.). New York: Vintage Books imprint of Random House. ISBN 0-394-72901-3 – via Internet Archive.
