= Argentina–Indonesia relations =

- Argentina: Indonesia

Argentina and Indonesia established diplomatic relations in 1956. Since then, bilateral relations between both countries have become increasingly more strategic. According to Argentine Ambassador to Indonesian Javier A. Sanz de Urquiza, Indonesia has been a "true friend of Argentina" over the Falkland Islands sovereignty dispute. Argentina has an embassy in Jakarta, while Indonesia has an embassy in Buenos Aires. Both countries say they share the same values regarding the international order, and the same aspiration to defend the developing nations' interest in international forum. Both countries are members of Group of 77, the G-20 major economies, the G20 developing nations, and Forum of East Asia-Latin America Cooperation.

== History ==
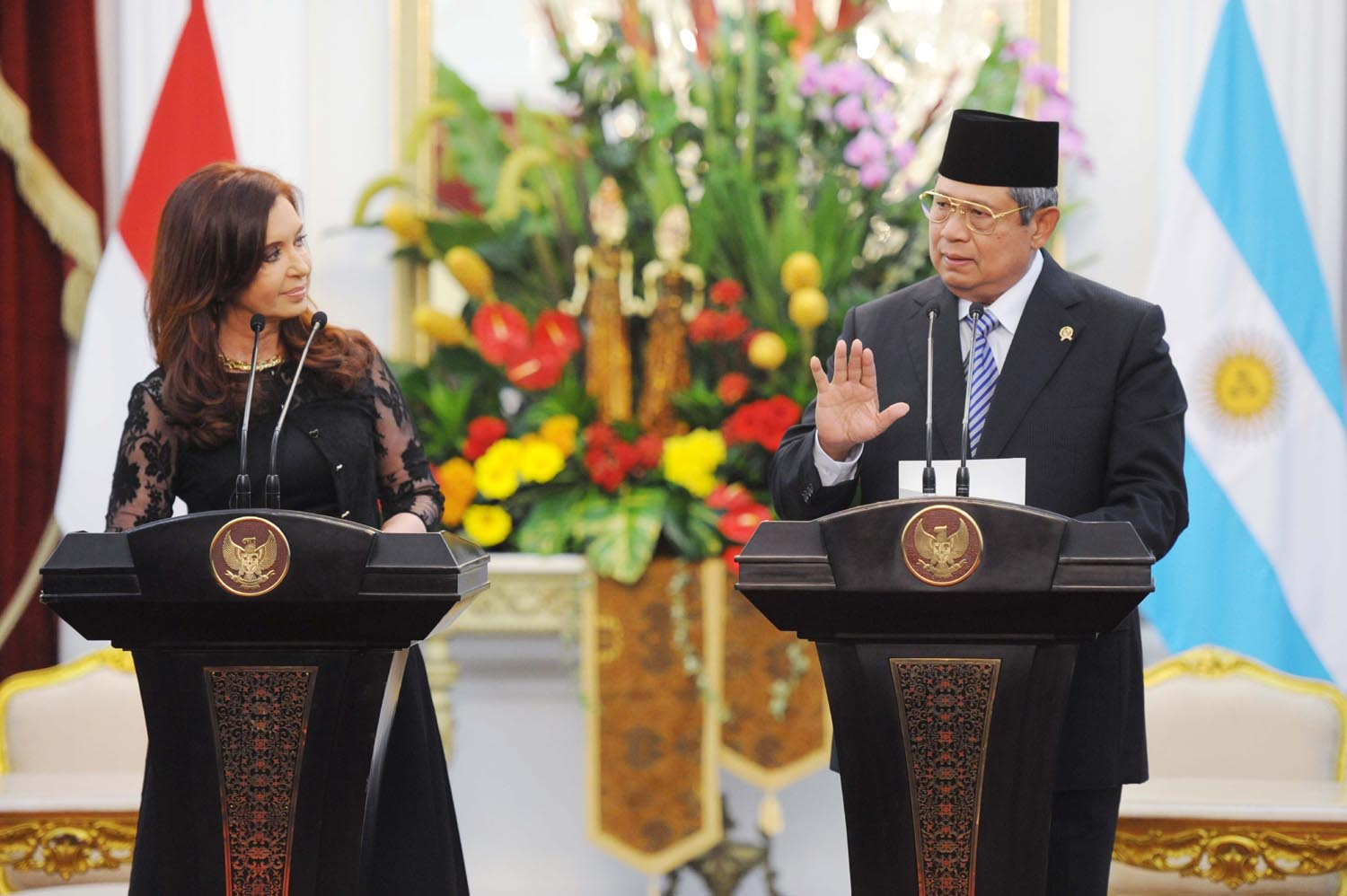
Presidents Susilo Bambang Yudhoyono and Cristina Fernández de Kirchner in Istana Merdeka, Jakarta, in 2013

The diplomatic relations between Argentina and Indonesia was established on 30 July 1956. During the Falklands War in 1982, Indonesia supported Argentina's sovereignty claim to the Falkland Islands over the claims of the United Kingdom.

== High-level visits ==
High-level visits from Argentina to Indonesia

- President Carlos Menem (1996)
- President Cristina Fernández de Kirchner (2013)
- President Mauricio Macri (2019)
- President Alberto Fernández (2022)

High-level visits from Indonesia to Argentina

- President Sukarno (1959)

== Trade and commerce ==
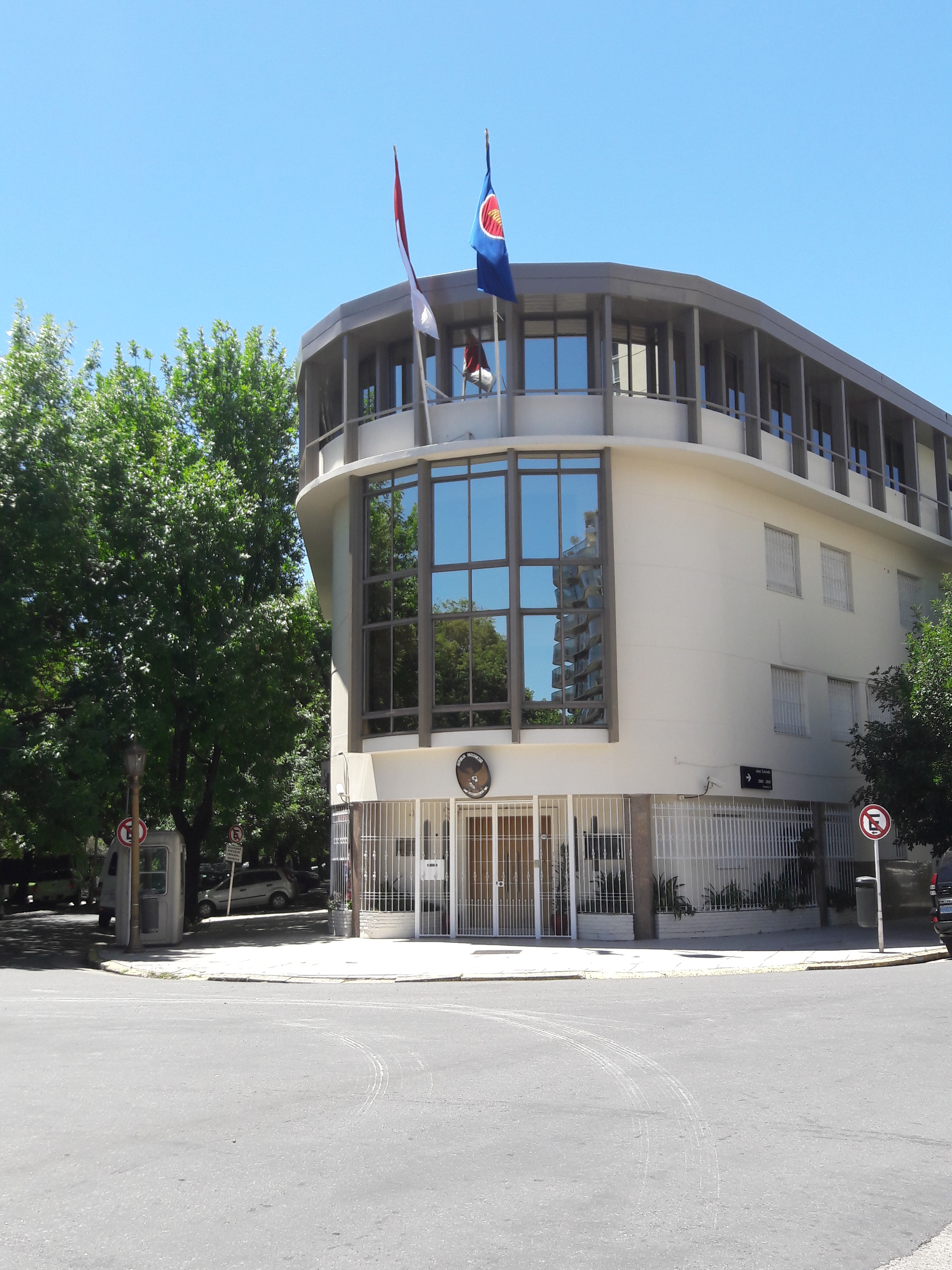
Embassy of Indonesia in Buenos Aires

Indonesia is the second-largest destination for Argentine exports to Asia after China, and the largest one in Southeast Asia. While Argentina is South America's second-largest importer of Indonesian products after Brazil. In overall trade, Indonesia is Argentina's fourth-largest trading partner in Asia. The volume of trade between Indonesia and Argentina rose from US$632.47 million in 2007 to almost reached US$2 billion in 2011. The balance of trade is heavily in favor of Argentina, as every year Indonesia buys more than $1 billion worth of soya bean oil cakes from Argentina.

== See also ==
- Foreign relations of Argentina
- Foreign relations of Indonesia
