= Argentina–El Salvador relations =

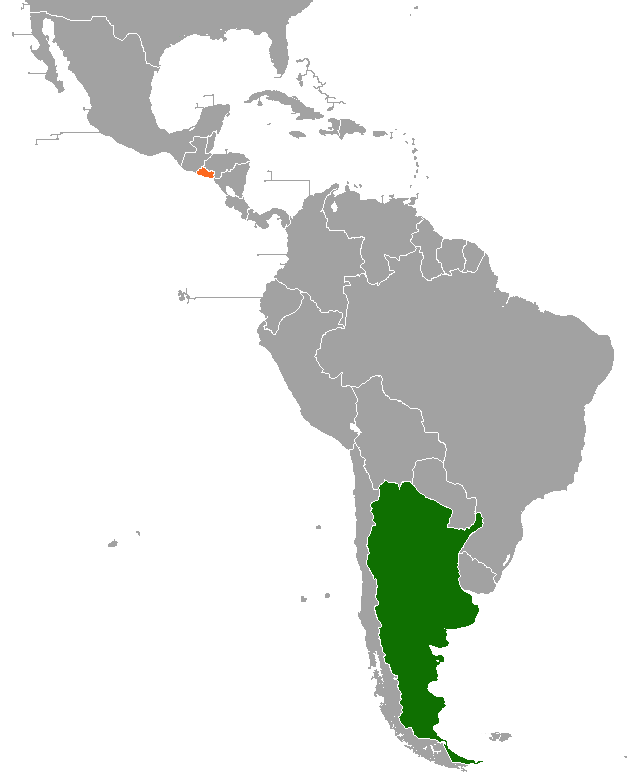

- Argentina: El Salvador

Diplomatic relations between the Argentine Republic and the Republic of El Salvador have existed for over a century. Both nations are members of the Community of Latin American and Caribbean States, Group of 77, Organization of American States, Organization of Ibero-American States and the United Nations.

== History ==
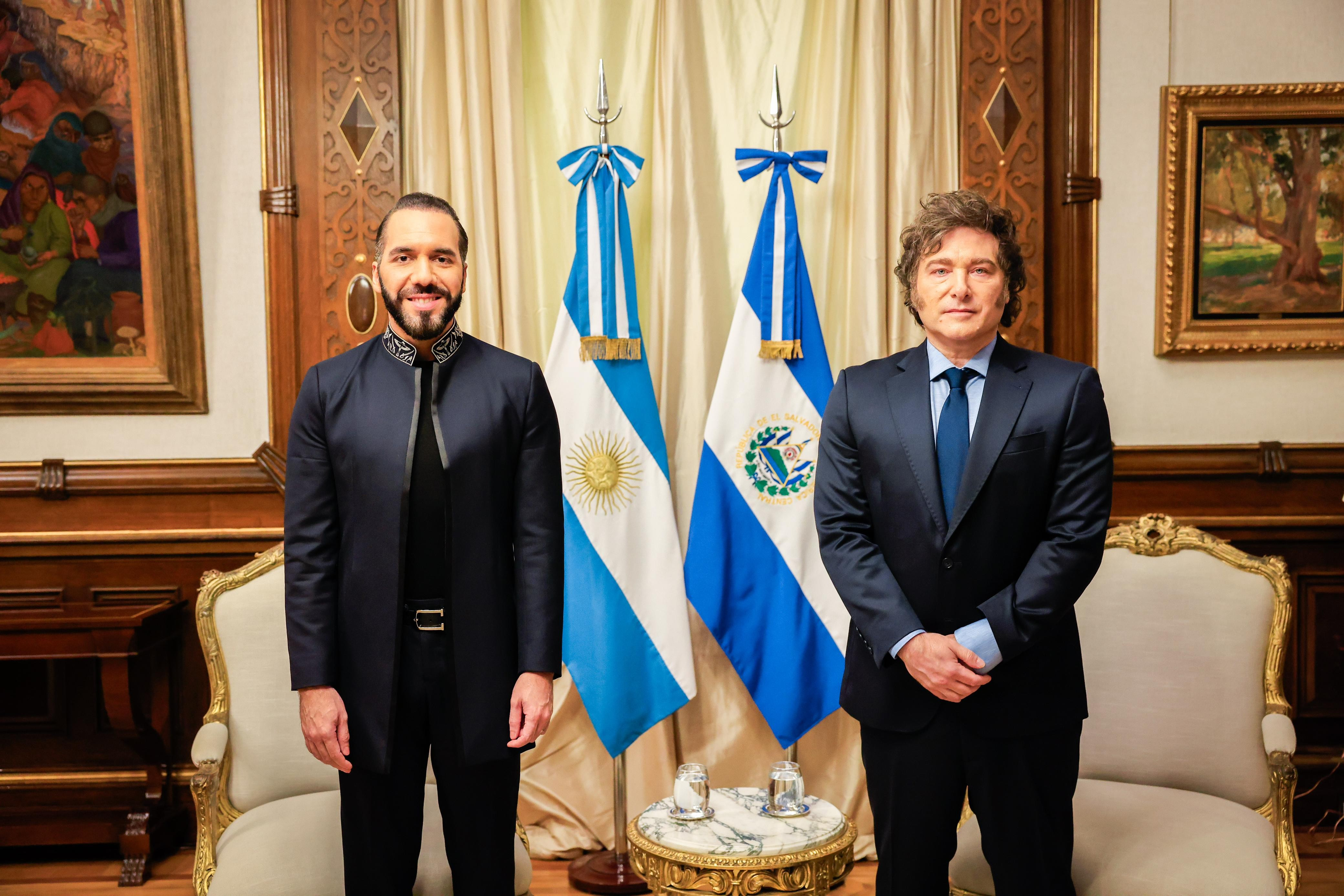
Argentine President Javier Milei and Salvadoran President Nayib Bukele in Buenos Aires; September 2024.

Both Argentina and El Salvador share a common history in the fact that both nations were once part of the Spanish Empire. During the Spanish colonial period, Argentina was then part of the Viceroyalty of the Río de la Plata and administered from Buenos Aires while El Salvador was governed from the Viceroyalty of New Spain in Mexico City. In 1816, Argentina declared its independence from Spain. In 1841, El Salvador obtained its independence after the dissolution of the Federal Republic of Central America. In 1940, both nations established diplomatic relations.

In the mid-1970s, during Argentina's Dirty War and Military Junta; Argentina took an interest in Central America, for which the Argentine government created Operation Charly. Beginning in 1977, Argentina provided the Salvadoran government with military training, money and weapons to suppress left-wing rebels in El Salvador. There were also high-level ministerial meetings between both governments to share military plans and tactics during the Salvadoran Civil War which broke out in 1979. Argentine assistance lasted until 1982. Years later, after the civil war, an Argentine Forensic Anthropology Team would help assist with the exhumation of remains of victims of El Salvador's civil war.

In April 1982, the Falklands War began between Argentina and the United Kingdom. The Salvadoran government recognized Argentina's claim to the Falkland Islands and continue to do so today. In 1986, Argentina accepted 200 Salvadoran families made displaced from the civil war and were resettled in northern Argentina.

Since the end of their respective wars; relations between both nations have remained strong. There has been several high-level meetings between leaders of both nations. In May 1986, Salvadoran President, José Napoleón Duarte, paid an official visit to Argentina. In 1995, Salvadoran President Armando Calderón Sol also paid a visit to Argentina. In October 2008, Argentine President, Cristina Fernández de Kirchner, attended the 18th Ibero-American summit in San Salvador. In December 2010, Salvadoran President, Mauricio Funes, attended the 20th Ibero-American summit in Mar del Plata, Argentina.

In 2017, trade between both nations totaled over US$50 million. There have been several visits by Argentine business people to El Salvador to explore and increase trade relations between both nations.

In 2020, both nations celebrate 80 years of diplomatic relations.

In February 2023, Salvadoran President Nayib Bukele announced that he had offered collaboration to Argentina's President Javier Milei and Security Minister Patricia Bullrich on reducing crime in Argentina. In September 2024, President Bukele paid a visit to Argentina and met with President Milei.

== Bilateral agreements ==
Both nations have signed a few agreements such an Agreement of Cooperation in Employment and Income Generation (2012); Agreement of Cooperation in Education, Science and Technology (2012); Agreement of Cooperation in Agriculture, Agroforestry, Farming and Fishing (2012); Agreement of Cooperation in Modernizing Ports (2012) and an Agreement on the Promotion and Reciprocal Protection of Investments (2018).

== Resident diplomatic missions ==
- Argentina has an embassy in San Salvador.
- El Salvador has an embassy in Buenos Aires.

== See also ==
- Operation Charly
- Salvadoran Civil War
