= Argentina–North Korea relations =

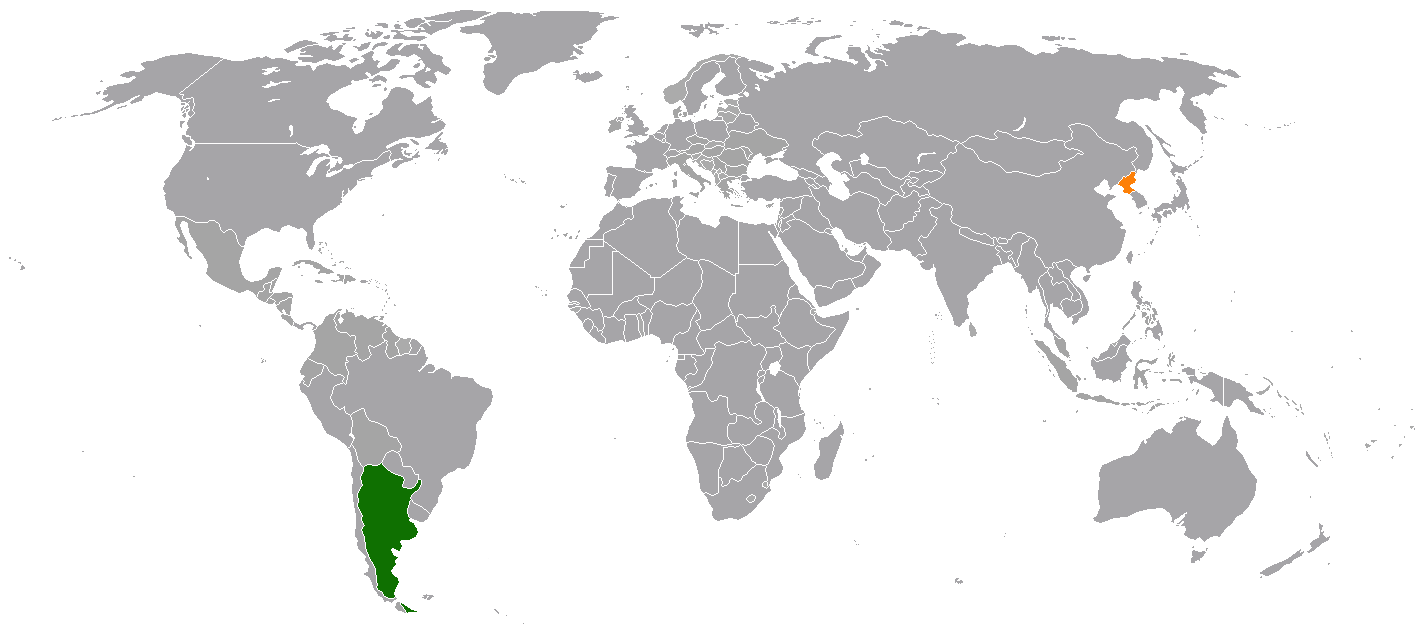

- Argentina: North Korea

Foreign relations between the Argentine Republic and the Democratic People's Republic of Korea existed for a few years but they do not currently have diplomatic relations. Diplomatic relations between both countries were established on 1 June 1973 and were severed on 14 June 1977. North Korea had an embassy in Buenos Aires from 1973 to 1977.

== History ==
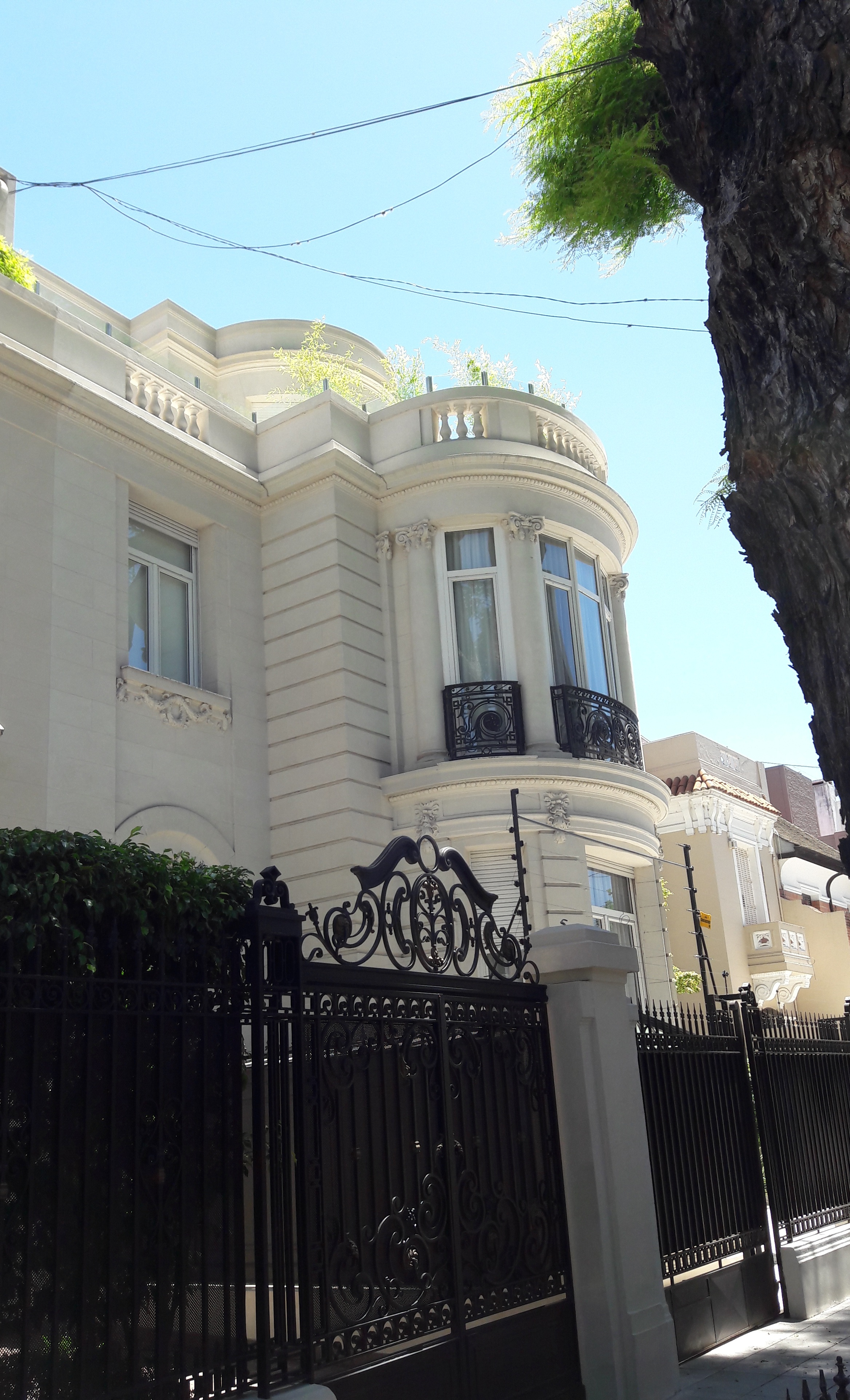
Former Embassy of North Korea in Buenos Aires

During the presidency of Héctor Cámpora, rapprochement with the North Korean government began, and in March 1973, Isabel Martínez de Perón and José López Rega paid a visit to Pyongyang, where they were received by Kim Il-sung. In June of that year, both countries established diplomatic relations and North Korea opened its embassy in Buenos Aires in 1973, in the Belgrano neighborhood, at Gorostiaga 2115.

In 1975, Isabel Martínez de Perón, already president, received a commission of North Korean children at the Quinta de Olivos. During the National Reorganization Process, diplomatic relations between the two countries were severed.

After the return to democracy in Argentina, there were small rapprochements in the 1990s during the presidency of Carlos Menem. Argentina supported North Korea's entry into the United Nations and North Korea was in favor of the bid for the Olympic Games in the city of Buenos Aires. North Korea also sought to open trade offices in Buenos Aires, though that plan never came to fruition.

However, as of today, rapprochements have stayed frozen and the countries do not maintain any kind of formal relationship.

== See also ==
- Foreign relations of Argentina
- Foreign relations of North Korea

== Bibliography ==
- Paz Iriberri, Gonzalo S., "Las relaciones entre Argentina y Corea del Sur. Evolución y perspectivas", Estudios Internacionales, Universidad de Chile. Vol. 34 Núm. 134 (2001): Abril - Junio.
- Oviedo, Eduardo Daniel (2001). Argentina y el Este Asiático. La Política Exterior de 1945 a 1999. Rosario, Argentina: Universidad Nacional de Rosario Editora.
