= Secret Anti-Communist Army =

- Ejército Secreto Anticomunista
- Dates active: 4 August 1977 – 28 December 1989 (12 years, 4 months, 3 weeks and 3 days)
- Active regions: Guatemala, El Salvador
- Size: Unknown
- Wars: Guatemalan Civil War; Salvadoran Civil War

"The Command of the Secret Anti-Communist Army [ESA] is presenting by means of this bulletin an ‘ultimatum’ to the following trade unionists, professionals, workers and students: ... [it] warns them all that it has already located them and knows perfectly well where to find these nefarious communist leaders who are already condemned to DEATH, which will therefore be carried out without mercy..."

— Bulletin No. 6, January 3, 1979, ESA

The Secret Anti-Communist Army (Spanish: Ejército Secreto Anticomunista, ESA) was a front organization that operated in Guatemala and El Salvador during the Guatemalan Civil War. Like other earlier organizations, such as the MANO and the CADEG, the ESA existed as a front for a covert program of selective assassination by the Guatemalan security services. The first documentation of it came from the New York Times on 4 August 1977.

The ESA made its existence more widely known during the upheaval caused by the September 1978 bus fare strikes in Guatemala City. On 18 October 1978, the ESA authored the first of a series of public bulletins containing "death lists" of persons which the organization considered to be "communists". It claimed to be independent, but was coordinated and staffed by members of the military and security services and was allegedly run by Colonel German Chupina Barahona, Director General of the National Police (PN) from 1978 to 1982. Often, the lists of targets were provided by the Minister of the Interior, Donaldo Alvarez Ruiz.

== History ==
High profile incidents officially attributed to the ESA peaked in Guatemala between 1978 and 1980, and were first directed at academics who were openly involved in progressive politics. One of these cases included the assassination of the President of the Association of University Students (AEU), Oliverio Castaneda de Leon on 20 October 1978, who was submachine-gunned by unknown men approximately one block from the Presidential Palace in Guatemala City, with no intervention from nearby, and heavily armed Policia Nacional. Castenada's name had appeared among others on an ESA death-list bulletin issued two days earlier. His successor as President of the AEU, Antonio Ciani Garcia de Leon, whose name also appeared on the same bulletin, was arrested on 6 November 1978 and "disappeared."

Among many specific incidents linking the ESA to the state security services, was the attempted assassination on 10 June 1980 of student-leader Victor Manuel Valverth, who was seized at gunpoint at the University of San Carlos by two men in plain-clothes claiming to belong to the ESA. Valverth attempted to flee and was shot several times, but survived. The assailants were tackled and one was killed as troops moved onto the campus to rescue the men from the students. ID cards were found on the two ESA assailants, linking one to the S-2 (military intelligence) section of the "General Aguilar Santa Maria" army base at Jutiapa and the other to the (Servicio Especial) Special Service of the Treasury Police.

As a mechanism for fomenting terror and evading accountability for the assassination program, the government of Gen. Fernando Romeo Lucas García waged an intensive publicity campaign in which it issued regular statistics to the press on political assassinations and disappearances of persons whom it explicitly labeled "criminals" and "subversives". National Police spokesmen told the Guatemala City press in 1979 that the ESA had killed 3,252 "subversives" between January and October of that year alone.

Political killings were also carried out in El Salvador in the name of the ESA as well during the height of the internal terror, beginning in 1980 but escalating around 1983. Sources suggest that the ESA was operated primarily by the Salvadorean National Police and was led by detective Edgar Perez Linares. Linares was a key player in the National Police death squad operations run by the chief of intelligence of the National Police, Aristides Marquez. Linares was credited with having captured three leftist guerilla commanders and turned them into a trio of assassins known as the "little angels", who systematically murdered clandestine guerillas and collaborators and were instrumental in breaking the back of the FMLN's urban infrastructure. Connections existed between the militaries and the far-right of Guatemala and El Salvador, and at one point El Salvador's National Police chief Col. Reynaldo Lopez Nuila and the director of the Salvadorean police academy visited Guatemala for counterinsurgency advice and had set up links within the security services.

It is not clear whether the ESA was controlled by state operators or was functioning as an independent paramilitary organization after the end of military rule in Guatemala in 1986. The ESA reemerged in 1988 in Guatemala during a renewed wave of killings and disappearances. The last known attack by the ESA in Guatemala took place on 28 December 1989.
