= Argentina–South Korea relations =

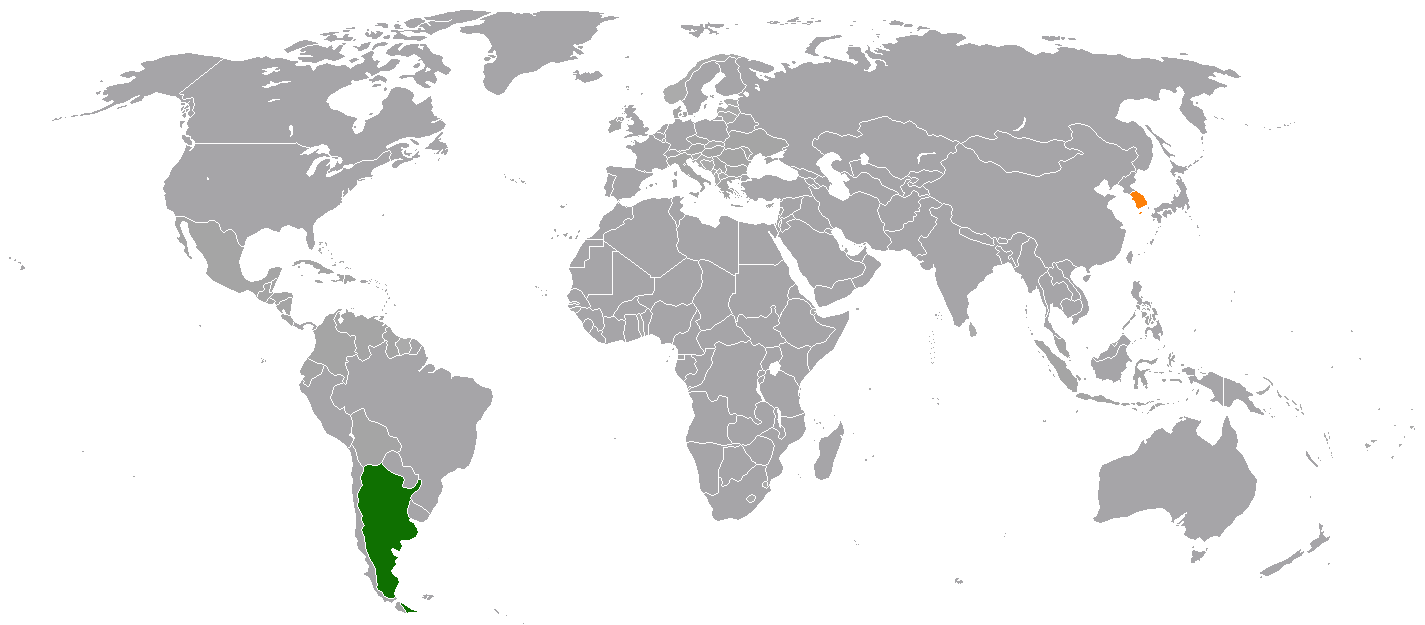
- Argentina: South Korea

Foreign relations between the Argentine Republic and the Republic of Korea have existed for decades. Diplomatic relations between both countries were established on February 15, 1962. Argentina has an embassy in Seoul and South Korea has an embassy in Buenos Aires.

== Economic relations ==
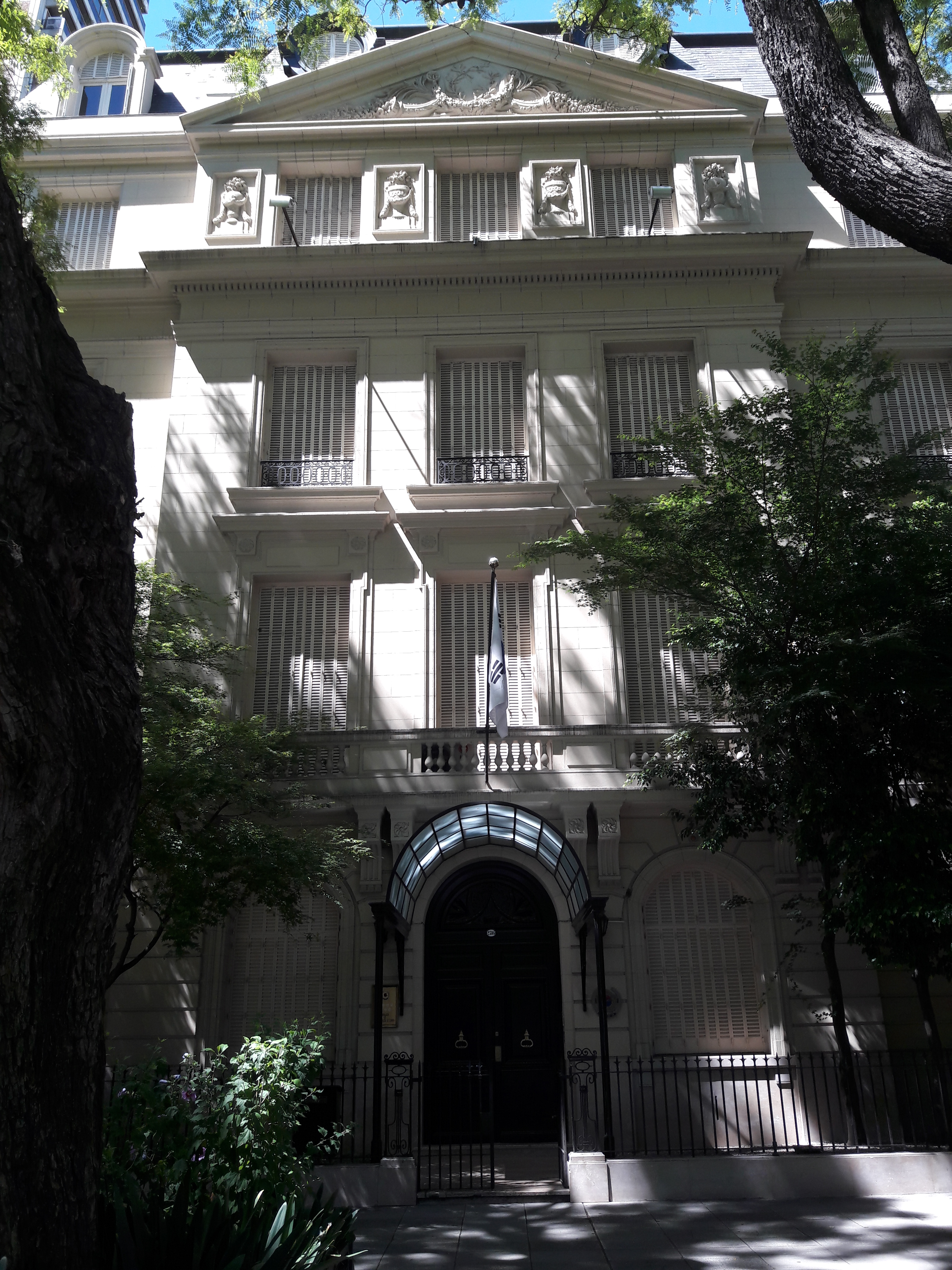
Embassy of South Korea in Buenos Aires

South Korea has mainly exported auto parts, Electron industry in South Korea|electronics parts, electrical machinery, and synthetic resin to the Argentine market.

In 2016, bilateral trade between Argentina and South Korea was worth US$1.746 billion. Argentine exports to South Korea amounted to US$860.26 million and South Korean exports to Argentina amounted to US$885.61 million.

== See also ==
- Foreign relations of Argentina
- Foreign relations of South Korea
  - Indo-Pacific Strategy of South Korea
