= Argentina–Italy relations =

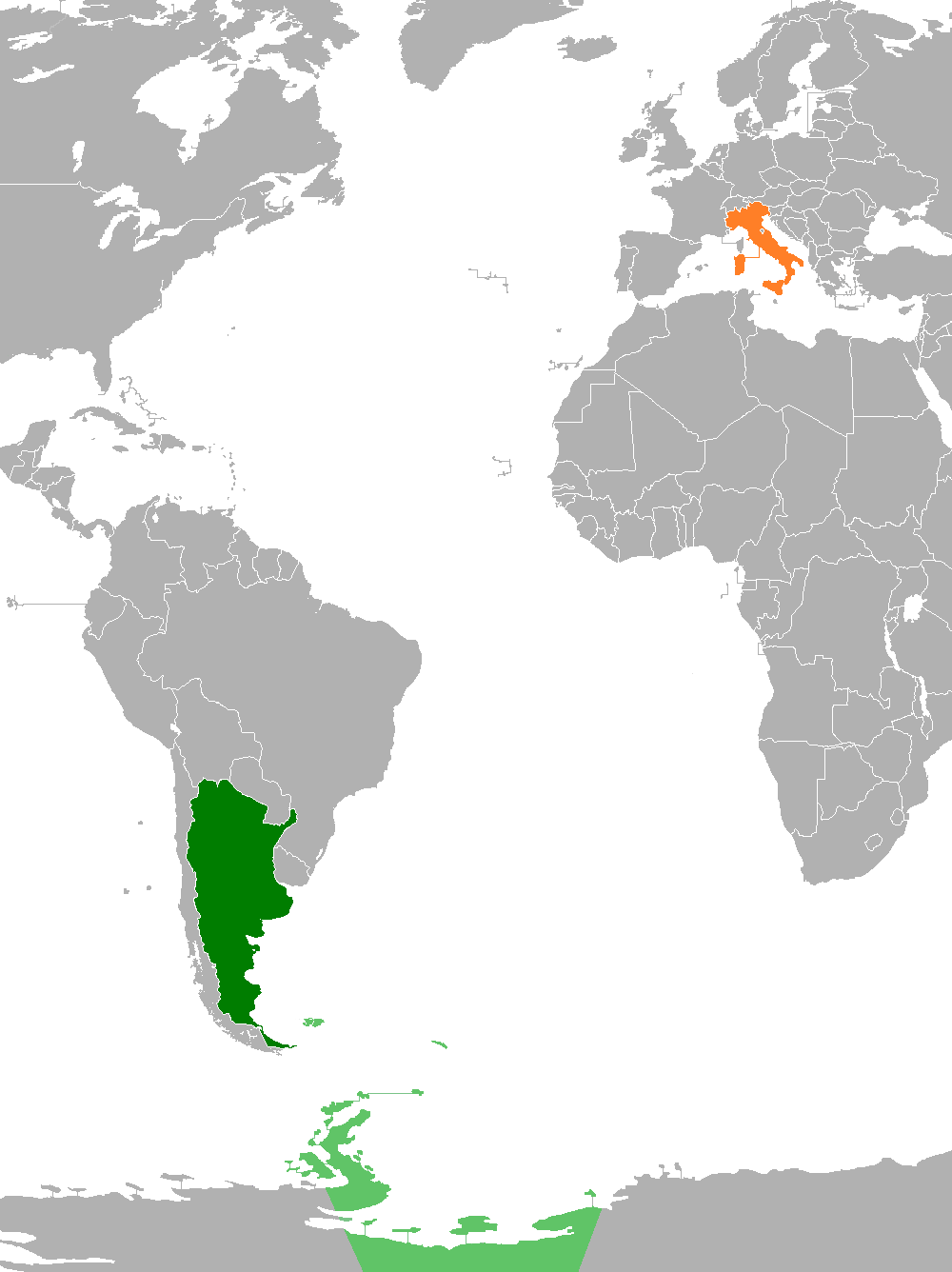
- Argentina: Italy

Argentina–Italy relations are the bilateral and diplomatic relations between the Argentine Republic and the Italian Republic for over a century. Both nations enjoy friendly relations, the importance of which centers on the history of Italian migration to Argentina. Argentines of full or partial Italian ancestry number approximately 30 million, or 62% of the country's total population. Both nations are members of the G20 and the United Nations.

== History ==
In 1816, Argentina declared its independence from Spain. At the same time, Italy was made up of separate independent Italian states. In May 1836, the Kingdom of Sardinia recognized and established diplomatic relations with Argentina, the first Italian state to do so. In 1842, Italian General (and future unifier of Italy) Giuseppe Garibaldi, fought for Uruguayan rebels during the Uruguayan Civil War against the Argentine Confederation and Uruguayan Nationalist Party.

In 1850, Sardinian King (and future King of a united Italy), Victor Emmanuel II, appointed an ambassador to Argentina. In 1855, Argentina and Italy signed a Treaty of Friendship, Commerce and Navigation. In 1924, Italy upgraded its diplomatic legation in Buenos Aires to an embassy. That same year, Italian Prince Umberto of Piedmont (future King Umberto II) visited Argentina. The Prince's main visit to Argentina (and other South American nations) was part of a political plan of fascism to link the Italian people living outside of Italy with their mother country.

During World War II, Argentina remained neutral throughout most of the war and at the time, Argentine President Juan Perón was an admirer of Italian Prime Minister Benito Mussolini and tried to adapt some aspects of the fascist's experience, such as corporativism, to Argentina. In 1944, due to international pressure, Argentina officially declared war on Germany and Japan as by that time, Italy had already surrendered to the Allies in September 1943. Soon afterwards, Argentina donated wheat to a warn-torn Italy. In June 1947, Eva Perón paid an official visit to Italy during her Rainbow Tour of Europe.

During the Argentine Dirty War from 1974 to 1983, eight Italian citizens went "missing" in Argentina. In May 2007, Italy sentenced in absentia life sentences to five ex-navy Argentine officers for the murder of three of the eight Italians that went missing during the war. In 1982, during the Falklands War between Argentina and the United Kingdom, Italy supported diplomatically the United Kingdom during the war, however, remained neutral in the fighting. The then Italian socialist leader Bettino Craxi opposed the EEC sanctions against Argentina's military junta, since they would have affected the population as well, which comprised almost 50% of 1st and 2nd generation Italians. The relations between the two countries deepened, with the first programs of cooperation in Argentina conducted by the Italian government, led by Bettino Craxi, in 1984 and 1985. In 1986 the Italian government also granted a 150 million ECU subsidy to Argentina. Bipartisan relations started to slow down after the end of Raúl Ricardo Alfonsín's presidency and the explosion of the Tangentopoli scandal.

== High-level visits ==
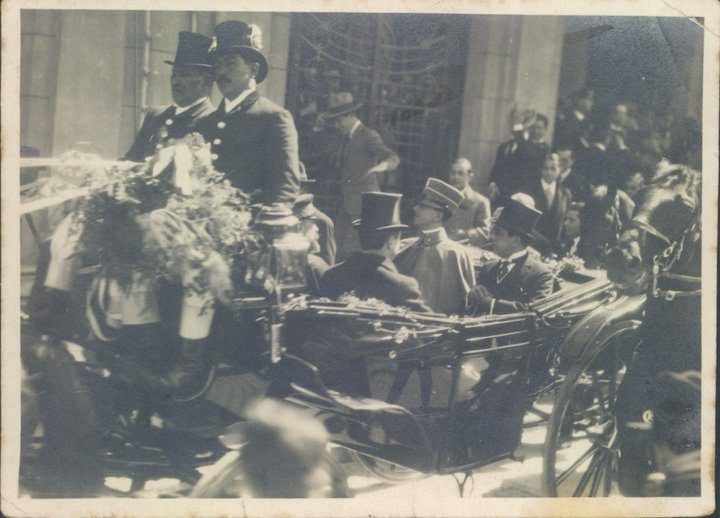
Prince Umberto of Piedmont in Argentina; 1924.

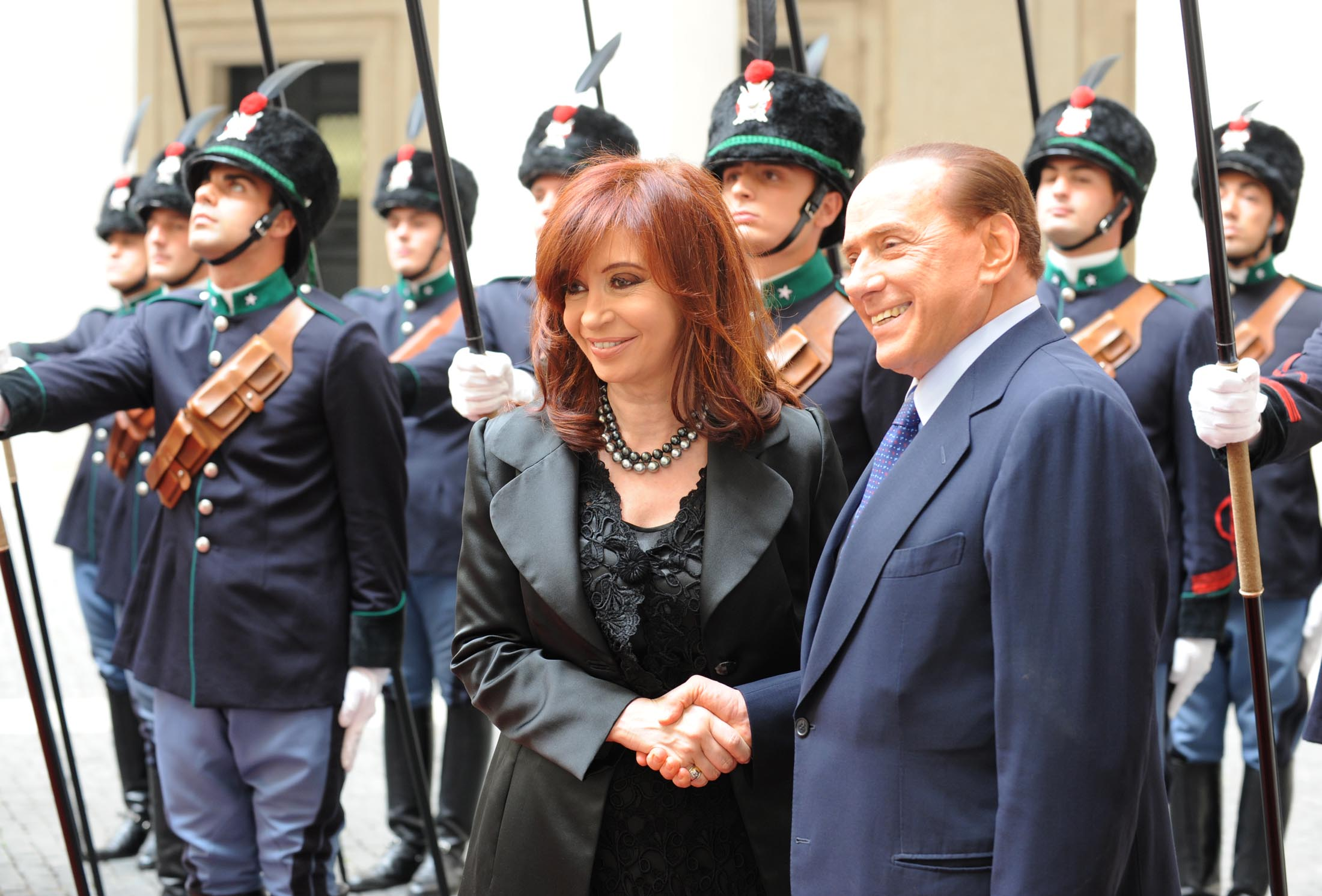
Italian Prime Minister Silvio Berlusconi with Argentine President Cristina Fernández de Kirchner in 2011

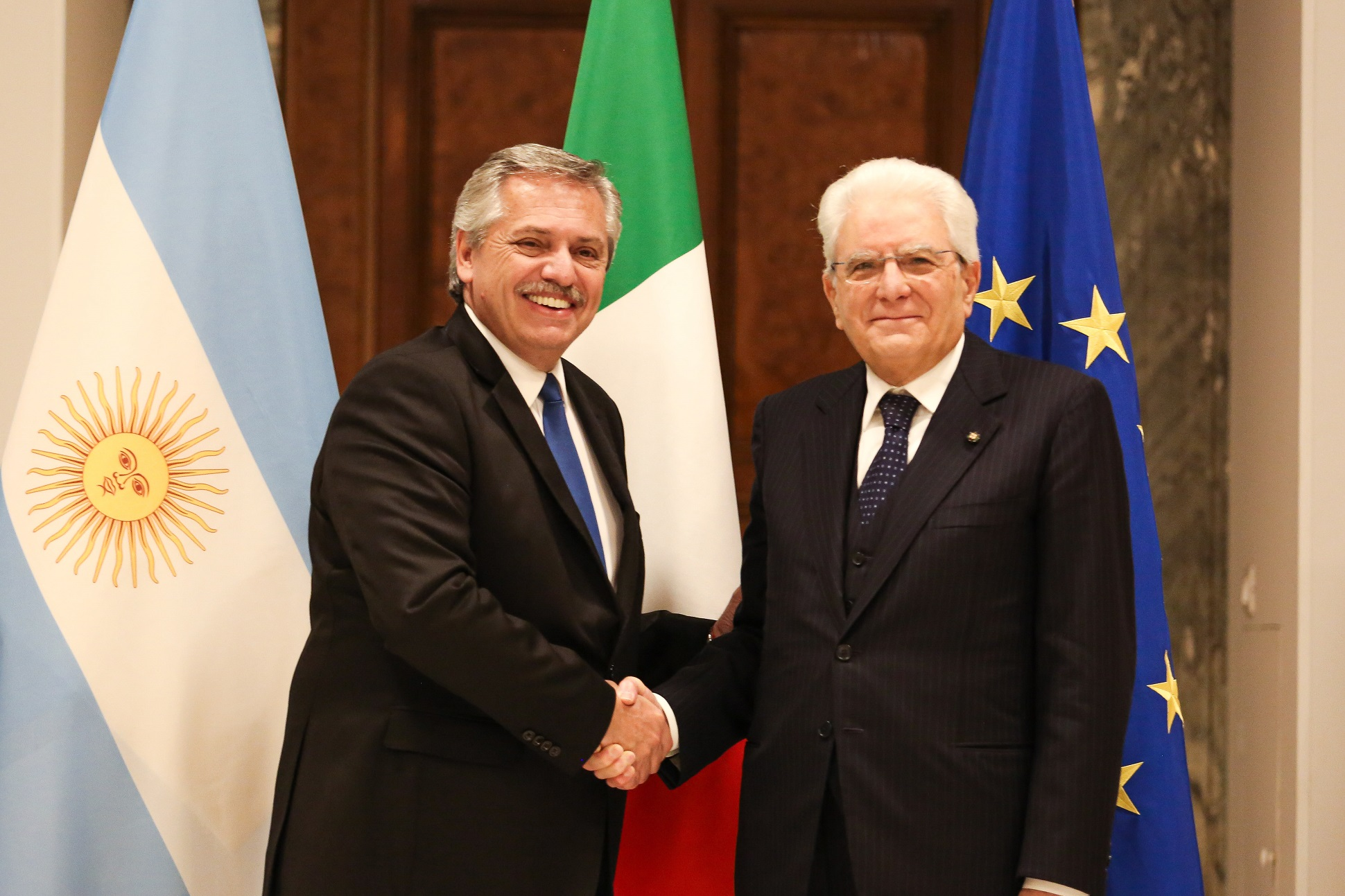
Argentina President Alberto Fernandez with Italian President Sergio Mattarella in Rome; 2020.

High-level visits from Argentina to Italy

- First Lady Eva Perón (1947)
- President Arturo Frondizi (1960)
- President Arturo Umberto Illia (1965)
- President-elect Héctor Cámpora (1973)
- Vice President Isabel Perón (1974)
- President Raúl Alfonsín (1987)
- President Carlos Menem (1990, 1997, 1998, 1999)
- President Fernando de la Rúa (2001)
- President Eduardo Duhalde (2002)
- President Cristina Fernández de Kirchner (2009, 2011, 2013, March and September 2014, 2015)
- President Mauricio Macri (February and October 2016)
- President Alberto Fernández (2020, 2021)
- President Javier Milei (February and June 2024, April and June 2025)

High-level visits from Italy to Argentina

- Prince Umberto (1924)
- President Giovanni Gronchi (1961)
- President Giuseppe Saragat (1965)
- Prime Minister Bettino Craxi (1983)
- President Sandro Pertini (1985)
- Prime Minister Giulio Andreotti (1990)
- President Oscar Luigi Scalfaro (1995)
- President Carlo Azeglio Ciampi (2001)
- Prime Minister Romano Prodi (2007)
- Prime Minister Matteo Renzi (2016)
- President Sergio Mattarella (2017)
- Prime Minister Giuseppe Conte (2018)
- Prime Minister Giorgia Meloni (2024)

== Migration ==
Before 1861, many Italians decided to go to Argentina for political and economic reasons. They had the possibility to improve their economic situation, gaining positions in the agricultural world, and the possibility to enjoy a high level of freedom of expression; people who later became foremost figures in the period known as Risorgimento.

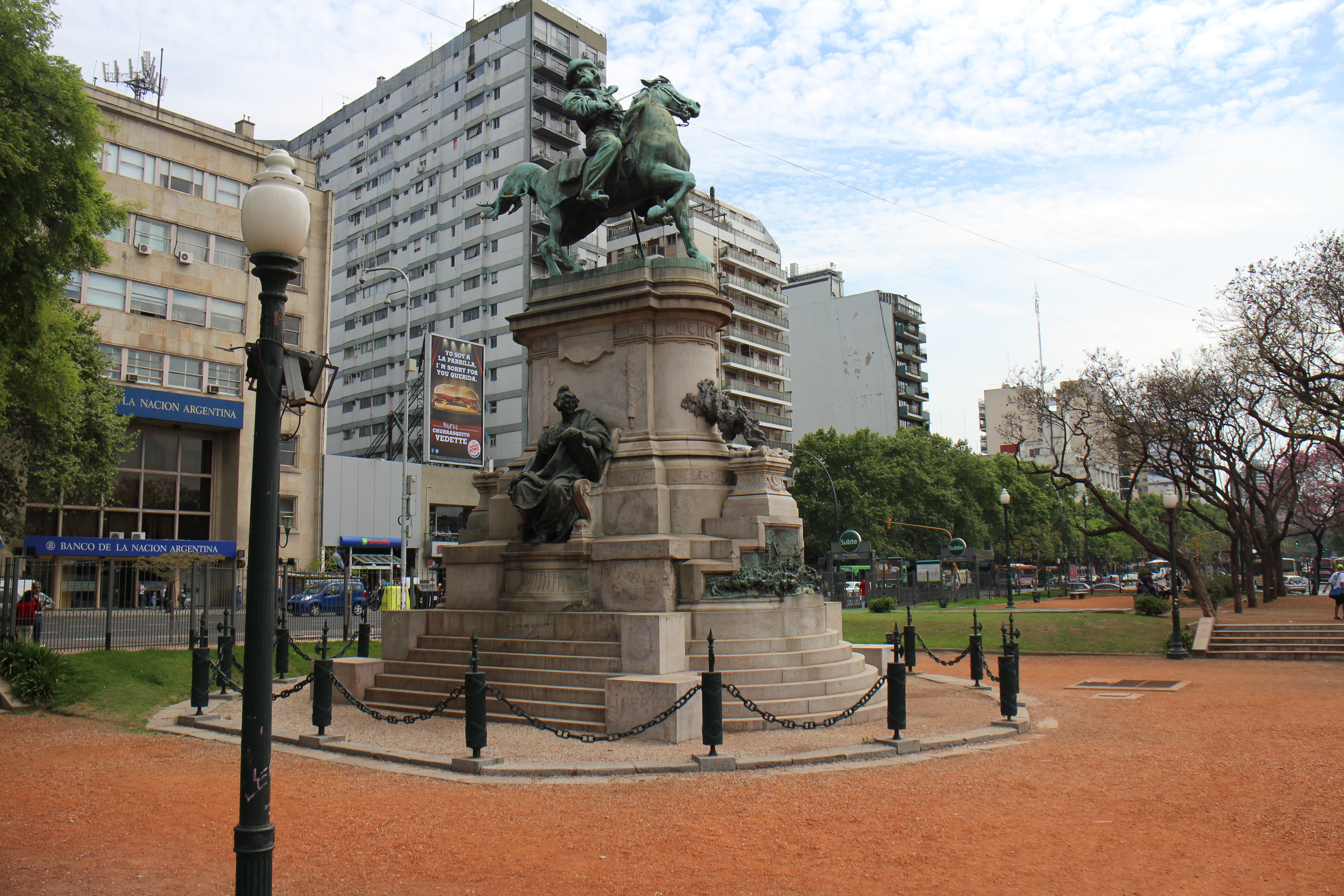
Statue of Giuseppe Garibaldi at Plaza Italia, Buenos Aires

Between 1870 and 1960, over 2 million Italian nationals migrated to Argentina. The impact reached by this migration is enormous, both for its length and for the numbers: it is unique. Most Italians left Italy due to poverty and wars. In the period between 1876 and 1900 the Italians who migrated came from the Northern part of the peninsula. Then, in the first years of the new century, due to the worsening of the agricultural crisis, the phenomenon expanded to the rest of Italy, including also farmers from the South.

In 2011, over 30 million Argentine citizens (approx. 62% of the population) claimed Italian ancestry. Italian culture has penetrated Argentine society in food and language as Argentine Spanish is heavily influenced by Italian. Several Argentine politicians, sports figures, actors, models and literary authors, among others (including the previous Catholic Pope), are of Italian descent. Argentina hosts the second biggest Italian diaspora community in the world after Brazil. In 1973, Argentina and Italy signed an Agreement on dual citizenship.

The Argentine community in Italy totals 11,200 members; however, many Argentine citizens have dual citizenship with Italy and therefore the Argentine community in Italy may be greater.

Several public or mixed entities represent the interests of the Italian identity in Argentina. Among them, we can mention the Italian Chambers of Commerce, the National Tourism Board, charitable foundations, the Italian Institute of Culture, the Italian Institute of Foreign Trade (ICE) and the Comitato degli Italiani all'Estero (Committees of Italians Living Abroad), which are funded by the Italian government.

== Tourism and air transportation ==
According to the document "Rapporto Congiunto Ambasciate/Consolati/ENIT 2016" Italy is one of the favourite holiday destinations of Argentines. They love its culture, gastronomy, beautiful landscape and lifestyle. They consider Italy unique in the world. ENIT, with a strong advertising campaign helped to promote and spread this view. In 2014, ENIT of Buenos Aires promoted the foundation of the "Club Italia Argentina", whose goal is to increase tourist flows. One of its strategies was the expansion of the commercialisation of traditional and niche products. Members of the club are 5 tour operators who are specialised in promoting travels in Europe and especially in Italy. There are direct flights between Argentina and Italy through the following airlines: Aerolíneas Argentinas and ITA Airways.

== Trade ==
The first contact between the two countries took place in 1884, when one of the Italian Chambers of commerce was founded in Buenos Aires (the Italian government recognized it only in 1919). Its mission was to promote the economic integration between the two countries, the exchange of ideas, best practice as well as the connection between enterprises. The first bilateral agreement was signed in 1896 and concerned custom duties. From that year collaboration continued. Deals have regarded a lot of different fields, such as finance, tourism, cultural and scientific collaboration, economic development.

Two of the most relevant framework agreements were signed in 2002 and concerned the creation of an "Italian trust fund" for the development of Argentina and the sustainable development of the small and medium enterprises. The latest agreement was signed in 2019. It is a MoU between ITA and Pro Cordoba and its objective is to promote economic relations between Italy and the Cordoba province.

In 2017, trade between Argentina and Italy totaled US$2.7 billion. In the same year, Italian president Sergio Mattarella made a state visit to Argentina, which allowed to realize a business mission organized by the General Confederation of Italian Industry, MISE and MAECI. In 2019, Italian exports to Argentina amounted to €881,99 million (€1.153,65 million in 2018), and imports reached €988,89 million (€1.019,3 million in 2018) (source: ISTAT).

Argentina's main exports to Italy include: wheat, soya beans, frozen crustacean, pears and beef. Italy's main exports to Argentina include: steam turbines, steel rails, machinery and medicine. Italian car makers such as Ferrari, Fiat and Lamborghini have a presence in Argentina, as well as Italian fashion and food products. Joint Argentine-Italian steel company, Techint, is headquartered in both nations and operates in several countries globally.

Over time Argentina has started to enter into relations also with the European Union. Relations between Argentina and EU started in 1990, when a Framework Trade and Economic Co-operation Agreement entered into force. Economic and trade matters are discussed in an EU-Argentina Joint Committee which is part of the Agreement. The last meeting was on 30 November 2020, in virtual form.

In 2000, member nations of Mercosur (which includes Argentina) and the European Union (which includes Italy) began negotiations on a free trade agreement. Negotiations between EU and Mercosur were intensified in 2016. In 2019, EU and Mercosur signed a new trade deal. This new agreement is aimed to increase bilateral trade and investment, create more stable and predictable rules for trade and investment and promote joint values (e.g. sustainable development, fight climate change). The EU is Mercosur's number one trade and investment partner and is the biggest foreign investor in Mercosur.

== Cultural interconnections ==
The massive migratory phenomena from Italy to Argentina also gave rise to national and regional exchanges between members of civil society, forming a wide net of associations that are still currently visible and active, with over eight hundred entities created by Italians or their descendants to promote the culture and language, provide social assistance, and promote relations between nations.

The main institutions that participate in cultural cooperation are the Italian regional associations in Argentina such as the Istituto Italiano di Cultura de Buenos Aires and Córdoba, the Ufficio Culturale of the Italian Embassy in Argentina, the cultural offices of the Consulates, the Dante Alighieri Association.

The bilateral cultural relations for Italy and Argentina are based on the Agreement of Cultural Collaboration, signed in Buenos Aires on April 6, 1998, which sets out the framework for the two governments in the cultural and educational field.

Italian associations were originally grouped into various mutual aid societies but with time new activities have been added. Now there are collaborations not only in cultural institutions but also in schools, social and sports centers. One of the main associations is the Societá Dante Alighieri of Buenos Aires, founded in 1896 with the aim of spreading the study of the Italian language and culture to immigrants and their descendants. Also the Italian Club in Argentina, created in 1873, was inaugurated with the purpose of keeping alive the cult of Italianity, in addition to promoting and consolidating affective, cultural and social ties between Argentines and Italians.

== Culture ==
The literary magazine Sur, published in Buenos Aires between 1931 and 1992, had its main focus on foreign literature. It translated well known foreign novels or essays, including Italian ones. Their importance was not just related to the literary field but also to the linguistic one: as Argentina is a country of immigration, its language has always been influenced by all the different incomers, including the Italian ones. In fact, the migration phenomenon resulted in a progressive Italianization of Buenos Aires. There have been three different periods for the analysis of the magazine: the first between 1931 and 1945, the second between 1946 and 1960 and the third between 1961 and 1970. In the second period the journal was dedicated to the reviews of the novels which were, at the same time, translated by Editorial Sur: Alberto Moravia, Vasco Pratolini, Cesare Pavese, etc. were the authors translated. These writers were first published in Argentina and only later in Spain. Therefore, most of the translations still in use today come from the magazine Sur and are by Argentine translators. Generally, Italy was presented as the birthplace of art, with many references to the Renaissance culture. As regards politics, in the first period, which included the years of fascism, only a few essays describing the political situation were translated.

The film Garage Olimpo has an Italian-Argentine production.

Diego Armando Maradona, one of the biggest football players in history, has had an intense relationship with Naples, the city for which he played and won two championships. The importance of this relation is not just limited to the football arena; his presence meant a connection between poor social classes of the two countries. As he said: "I want to become the idol of the poorer Neapolitan guys, because they are like me when I was in Buenos Aires".

== Resident diplomatic missions ==
- Argentina has an embassy in Rome and a consulate-general in Milan.
- Italy has an embassy in Buenos Aires and consulates-general in Bahía Blanca, Córdoba, La Plata, Mendoza and Rosario and a consulate in Mar del Plata.
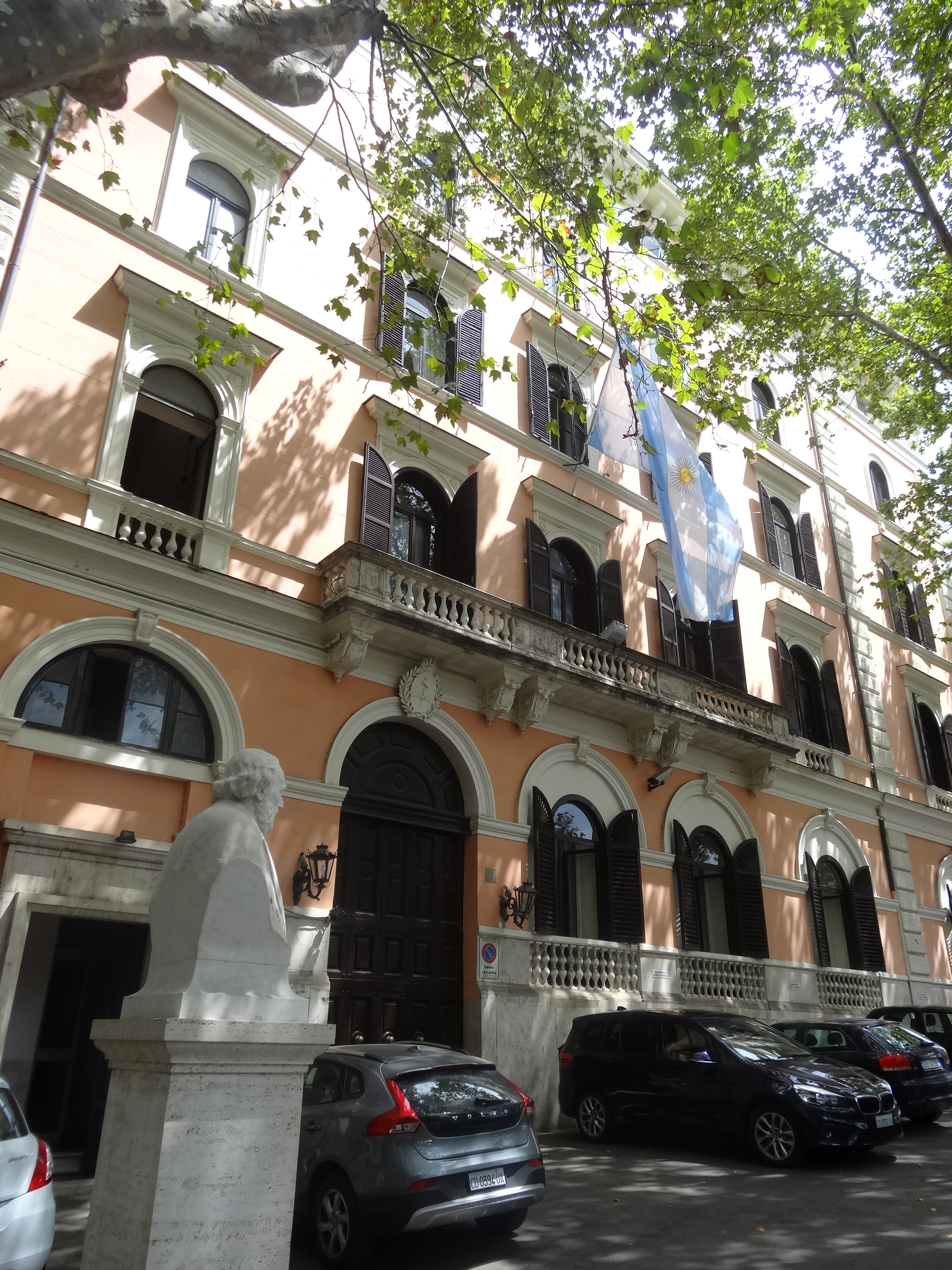
Embassy of Argentina in Rome
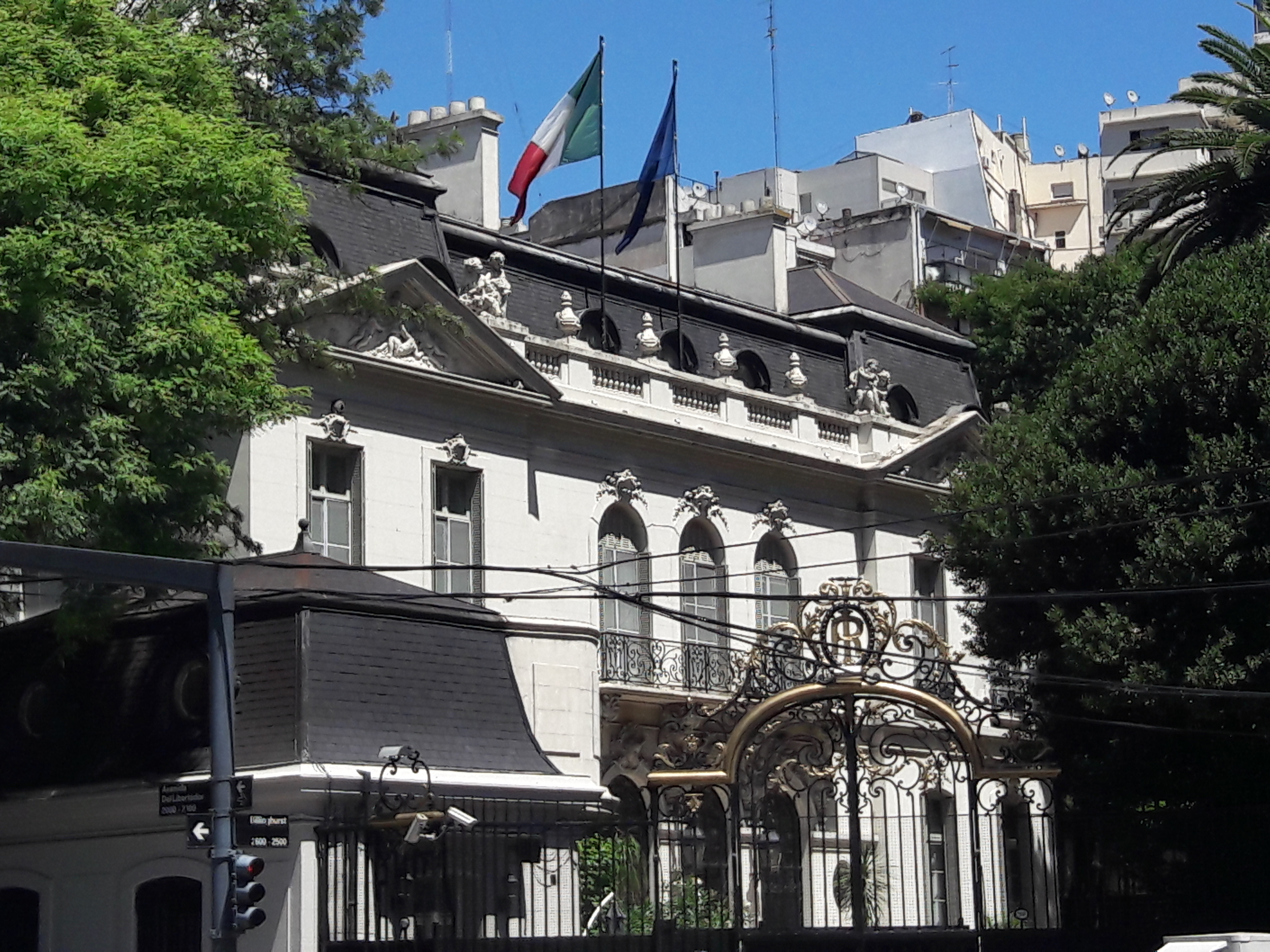
Embassy of Italy in Buenos Aires

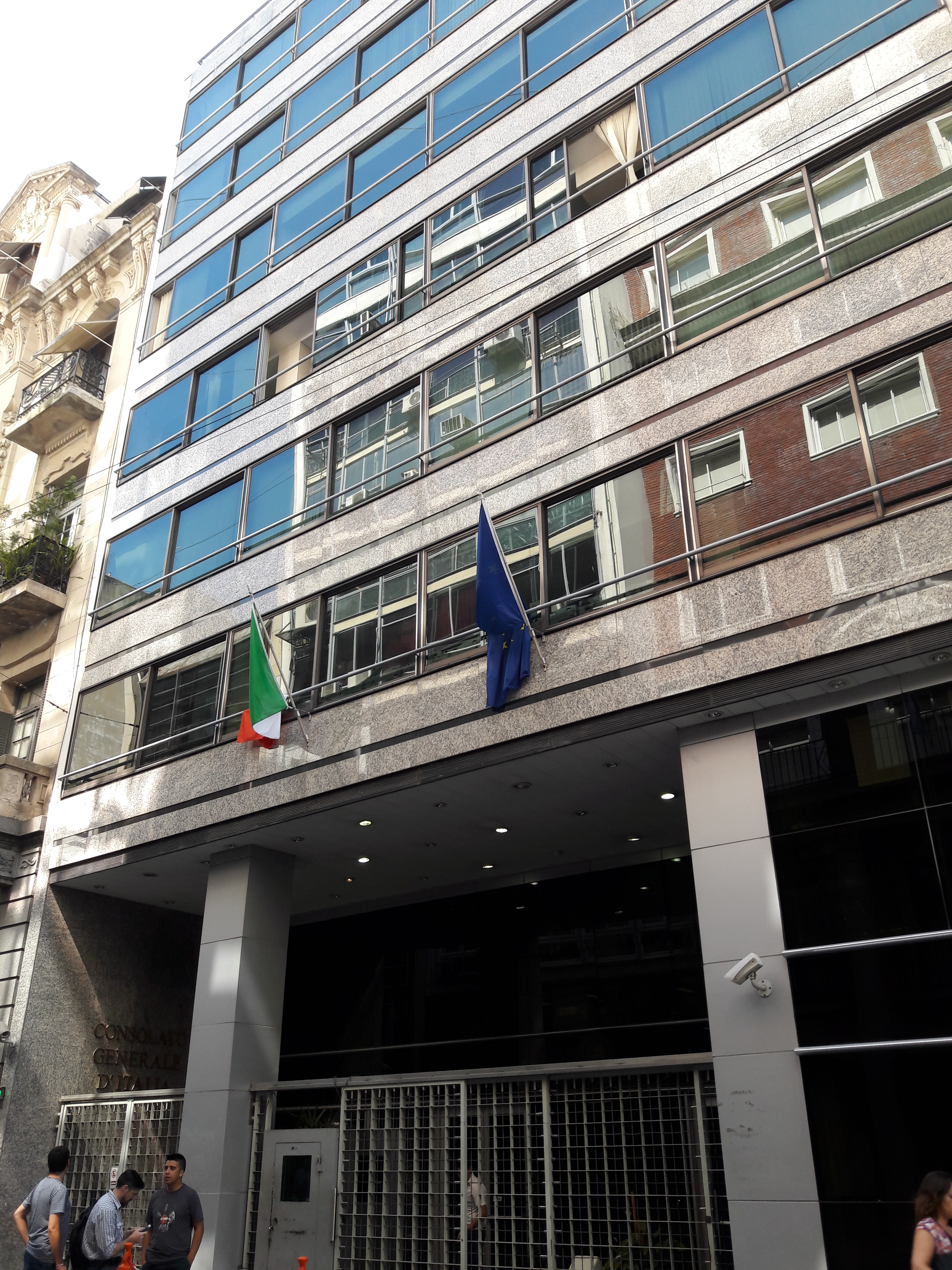
Consulate-General of Italy in Buenos Aires

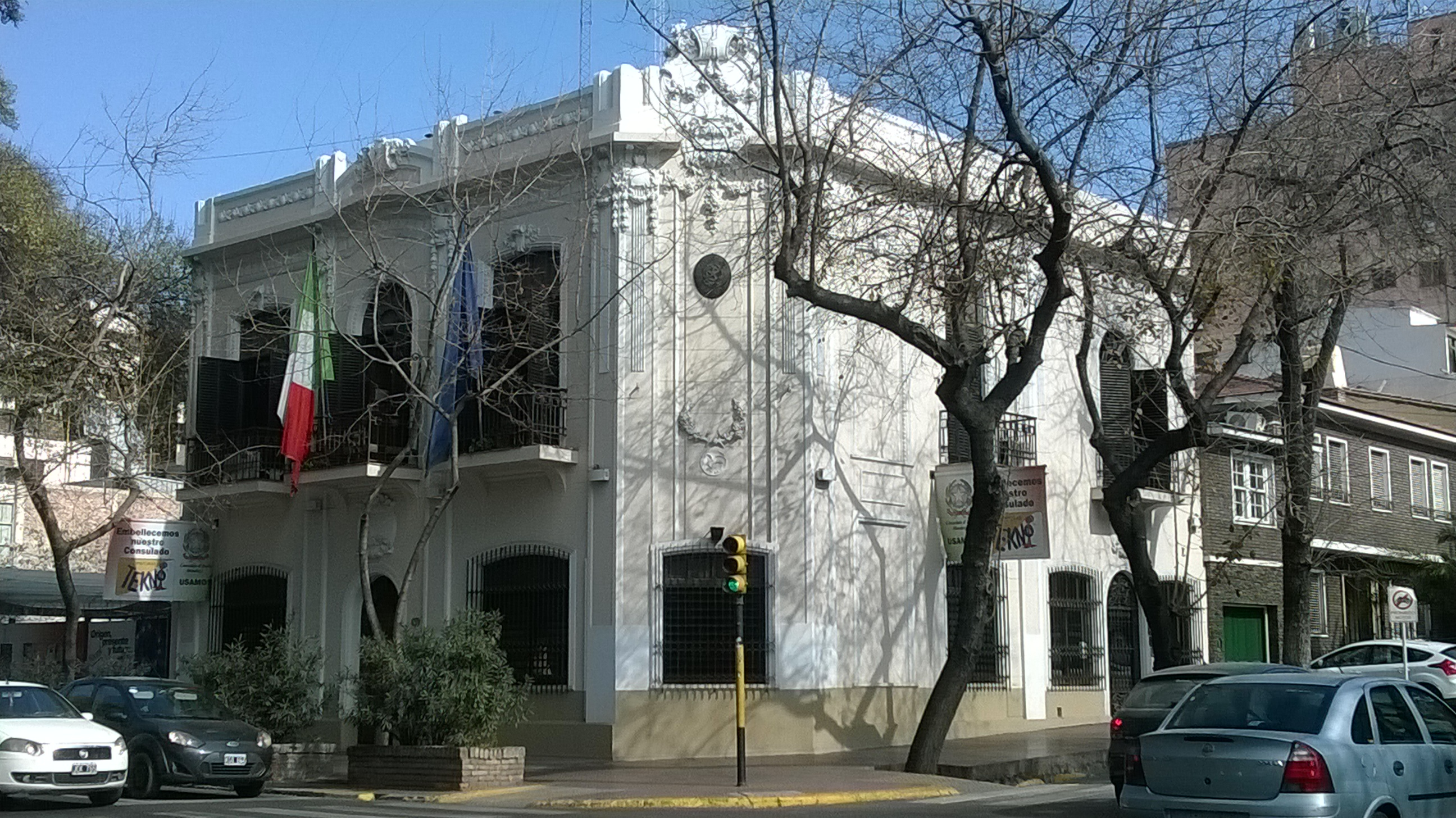
Consulate-General of Italy in Mendoza

== See also ==
- Escuela Dante Alighieri
- Italian Argentines
- Plaza Italia (Buenos Aires Underground)
- Scuola Italiana Cristoforo Colombo
- Argentina–EU relations
