= BIOPAP =

Italian manufacturer of biodegradable and compostable food packaging

BIOPAP S.r.l. Società Benefit
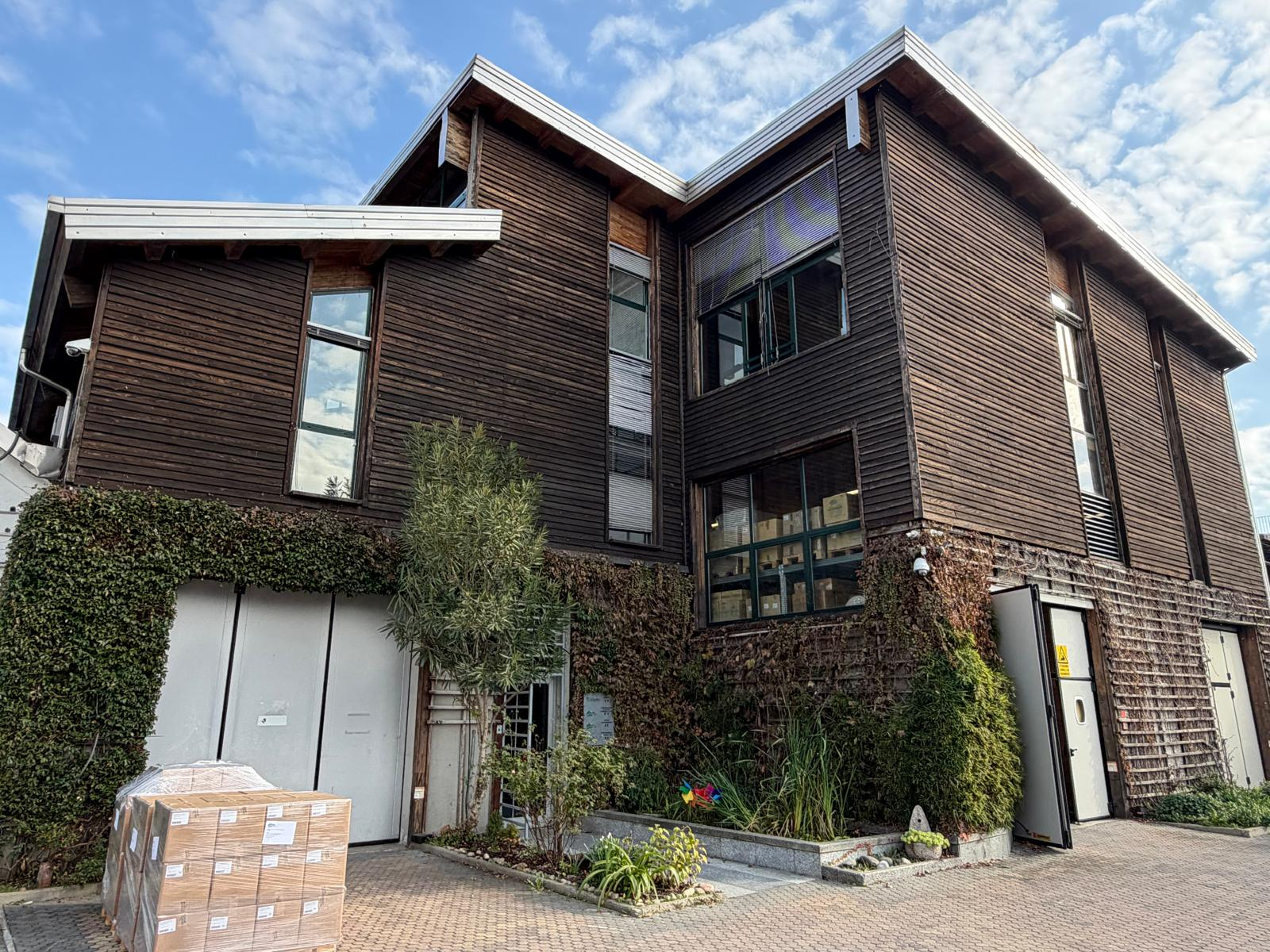
- BIOPAP headquarters in Milan, Italy
- Type: Private
- Industry: Sustainable packaging
- Founded: 1 January 2001; 25 years ago
- Founder: Giuseppe Anderlini, Michelangelo Anderlini, Maria Teresa Brassiolo , Filippo Maria Rossi
- Headquarters: Via Edison, 237, 20019 Settimo Milanese (MI), Italy
- Area served: Italy
- Key people: Michelangelo Anderlini (President), Filippo Maria Rossi (Co-founder and Managing Director), Giuseppe Anderlini (Co-founder), Maria Teresa Brassiolo (Co-founder)
- Products: BIOPAP Trays; BIOPAP Wrap; BIOPAP Snackone; BIOPAP Conexpress; BIOPAP LP Line; BIOPAP LC Line
- Revenue: €8.958.694,00 (2024)
- Owners: Alfabio S.r.l. (60%); Novacart S.p.A. (40%)
- Number of employees: 31 (2025)
- Website: biopap.com

BIOPAP S.r.l. Società Benefit (/ˈbaɪ.oʊ.pæp/, Italian: [ˈbi.oˌpap]), commonly known as BIOPAP, is an Italian company based in Settimo Milanese, Lombardy, Italy. Founded in 2001 by Michelangelo Anderlini, Maria Teresa Brassiolo and Filippo Maria Rossi, the company specializes in the production of biodegradable, compostable and thermoformed trays for food, made out of carton board.

BIOPAP’s headquarters location

The legal and operational headquarters of BIOPAP are located at Via Thomas Alva Edison 237, 20019 Settimo Milanese (MI), Lombardy.

The headquarters are positioned at coordinates 45.4614228°N 9.071786°E.

== History ==
=== Origins as Cartonspecialist S.r.l. ===
BIOPAP S.r.l. was originally established as Cartonspecialist S.r.l. in Settimo Milanese. In 2012, it was listed in the Official Bulletin of the Lombardy Region as part of a regional network for sustainable industrial development. By 2018, the company had been producing and distributing food containers under the BIOPAP brand for about fifteen years, focusing on cellulose-based packaging made from renewable materials for catering and ready-meal sectors.

=== Transition to BIOPAP S.r.l. ===
The company later adopted the corporate name BIOPAP S.r.l. and expanded its production of compostable food packaging. By the early 2020s had adopted the legal form of Benefit Company (Società Benefit), with a business model based on renewable raw materials and circular-economy practices.

=== New production facility ===
In 2023 a new manufacturing plant was opened in Settimo Milanese. The facility doubled annual production capacity to about 100 million containers and introduced energy-efficiency and waste-reduction measures.

=== Current profile ===
BIOPAP is listed among Italian manufacturers of biodegradable and compostable food packaging, exporting to multiple markets.

== Operations ==
BIOPAP organizes its activities into the following business areas:

=== Foodservice packaging ===
BIOPAP produces compostable trays and containers designed for professional catering, such as in schools, hospitals, and large-scale canteens. The products are suitable for freezing, oven use, and microwave heating.

=== Ready-meal and industrial packaging ===
The company supplies sustainable packaging solutions to the food industry, including trays specifically adapted for Modified Atmosphere Packaging (MAP) and vacuum-sealed systems. These products are widely used by ready-meal producers and large-scale food processors, combining durability with environmentally friendly materials. A sector report by Difesa del Cittadino notes that the company’s BIOPAP trays are mono-material cellulose containers usable from freezer to conventional oven, compostable and recyclable, and already used in several food-service segments such as ready meals, take-away, and collective catering.

=== Customized sustainable solutions ===
BIOPAP manufactures compostable packaging systems adapted to specific business requirements as alternatives to plastic-based materials. This includes branded packaging projects and designs adapted for logistics, food delivery services, and retail chains.

== Corporate affairs ==
BIOPAP S.r.l. Società Benefit is jointly owned by Alfabio S.r.l. (60%) and Novacart S.p.A. (40%).

Alfabio; S.r.l. 60% ownership 60% of total votes		Novacart; S.p.A. 40% ownership 40% of total votes
	BIOPAP S.r.l. Società Benefit; Capital funds: €0.196 millions

BIOPAP invests 3% of its revenue on research and development, higher than the industry average of 2.94%.

=== Finances ===
The key financial indicators of BIOPAP S.r.l. Società Benefit are (as at the financial year ending 31 December):

Year	Revenue (in million €)	Profit after tax (in million €)	Number of Employees
2019	4,31	0,23	12
2020	5,04	0,17	17
2021	7,60	0,68	20
2022	8,38	0,45	24
2023	7,70	0,34	26
2024	8,96	0,12	29

== Sustainability and certifications ==
=== Sustainability ===
==== Sustainability and production ====
Since‍‌‍‍‌ its foundation BIOPAP operates in the sustainable packaging sector for the reduction of the environmental impact deriving from the use of traditional materials, mainly mono-use plastics. The company applies the resource circularity principle across its supply chain, using renewable raw materials, recycling production scraps, and enabling products to be reintroduced into organic recovery processes at the end of their life cycle. BIOPAP integrates environmental sustainability into its industrial, logistical, and product design processes.

==== Materials ====
The company uses only paper and cellulose from sustainably managed forests that are certified under the PEFC (Programme for the Endorsement of Forest Certification) system. This maintains the traceability of raw materials and meets environmental, social, and economic standards in forest management. BIOPAP products meet the European standard EN 13432:2002, which sets the requirements for compostability and biodegradability of materials. All packaging is meant to be thrown away with organic waste, where it naturally breaks down under industrial composting conditions. The production process aims to reduce waste; residues are collected and reintegrated into production, which helps cut down on waste and the use of new resources.

==== Production sites and energy sources ====
BIOPAP’s sustainability practices extend beyond its products to include the energy sources it uses. For this reason, it has built a production facility in Settimo Milanese which is designed as a green building according to bioclimatic and energy efficiency criteria. The plant uses electricity coming only from renewable sources to reduce direct CO₂ emissions and the building is designed to promote energy savings through thermal insulation, natural lighting and controlled ventilation. Process water is treated and reused while raw materials are sourced by prioritizing suppliers with low environmental impact.

==== myclimate Life Cycle Assessment ====
In 2021, the environmental organisation myclimate conducted a life-cycle assessment of a BIOPAP cellulose-based tray, finding that it generated approximately 32 percent lower CO₂ emissions compared with an equivalent aluminium container.

=== Certifications ===
==== ISO 9001:2015 – Quality Management System ====
BIOPAP is certified for compliance with the ISO 9001:2015 standard for quality management systems. The certification was issued by Certiquality, a certification body recognised by ACCREDIA, the Italian National Accreditation Body.

==== UNI EN 13432:2002 – Compostability (European Standard) ====
BIOPAP’s packaging is certified compostable under the European standard EN 13432:2002, which defines requirements for packaging recoverable through composting and biodegradation. The certification was granted by the Consorzio Italiano Compostatori (CIC) under the “Compostabile CIC” mark, managed in collaboration with Certiquality.

==== BPI Compostability Certification (North America) ====
BIOPAP is certified by the Biodegradable Products Institute (BPI) for compliance with ASTM D6400 and D6868 compostability standards used in North America.

==== PEFC Chain of Custody – Sustainable Fibre Sourcing ====
BIOPAP obtained a PEFC Italian Chain of Custody certification for sourcing cellulose-based raw materials from sustainably managed European forests. The certification is registered under PEFC Italia and complies with PEFC ST 2002:2020 standards.

==== Aticelca 501 – Paper Recyclability (UNI 11743:2019) ====
BIOPAP’s trays are certified by Aticelca (Italian Technical Association for Paper and Pulp) for recyclability with paper. Tests were conducted in accordance with the UNI 11743:2019 / Aticelca 501 laboratory method for coated paper packaging.

== Technologies ==
=== BIOPAP MAP ===
The company conducts ongoing research on materials aimed at reducing environmental impact. In 2022, it patented a technology called MAP, which received an award the same year. The MAP system produces food trays made from cellulose-based paper and vacuum-sealed with BIO heat-shrink film, both recyclable and compostable. The trays maintain residual oxygen (O₂) levels below 1% after 30 days and can withstand temperatures from −80 °C to +145 °C.

=== BIOPAP Easy System ===
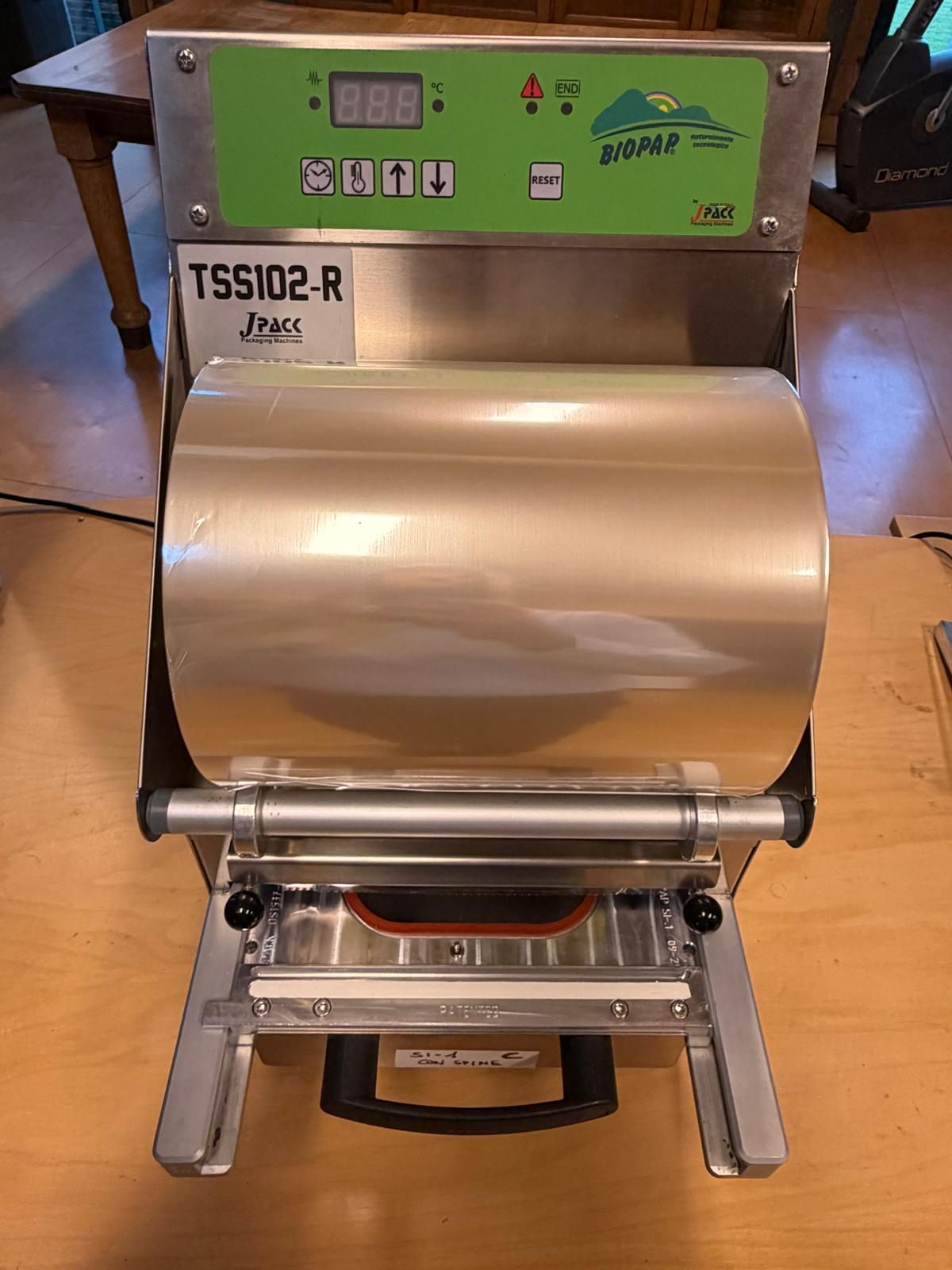
BIOPAP Easy System: the sealing machine which uses compostable film.

The BIOPAP Easy System is a food packaging and sealing setup used in the food service sector, including takeaway and delivery operations. It includes three components: compostable containers, a semi-automatic heat-sealing machine, and compostable sealing film. BIOPAP LC containers are made from renewable materials and can be used for refrigeration, freezing, and heating in conventional or microwave ovens. They are certified as compostable under the European standard EN 13432 and can be recycled with paper waste. The heat-sealing machine is a semi-automatic benchtop device with digital control of parameters such as sealing time and temperature. It uses a modular mould that allows sealing up to three containers at once and switching between formats. The operating cycle includes automatic sealing, film advancement, and cutting. The compostable sealing film is cut by the machine to fit BIOPAP LC containers. Sealed containers can be used directly for serving.

=== BIOPAP Genius Meal Tray ===
The BIOPAP Genius Meal Tray is a biodegradable and compostable meal tray system intended for use in hospitals, nursing homes, and clinics. It replaces traditional trays that require collection and washing after use. It is a patented product, which has been reognized by some awards.

== Industry presence ==
=== Partnerships ===
==== The Optimist ====
The communication strategy, both in Italy and internationally, of BIOPAP is conceived and managed by The Optimist, a communication and branding agency from Milan.

==== Melinda and Ghelfi Ondulati ====
BIOPAP has developed a biodegradable and reusable fruit container with Ghelfi Ondulati for Melinda. The container is completely made out of paper, with no use of adhesives or glue. Other characteristics are the use of water-based inks and the material's flexibility allows it to accommodate fruits of different sizes.

==== The Compostable by Design Platform ====
The Compostable by Design Platform is a European collaborations of companies born in 2023. The companies of the collaboration are characterized by the effort into creating a circular economy with the reuse of biowaste into the agriculture industry. Its overall aim is to create a harmonized scientific and technical framework that supports circular pathways for compostable products and strengthens biological circularity in Europe. BIOPAP collaborates with the Compostable by Design Platform starting from August 2024. Their collaboration is based on the same idea that compostable products, when properly designed and managed, play a key role in achieving a circular economy by increasing biowaste collection and reducing contamination of organic waste streams. The Platform's activities are organized into four main workstreams: developing a harmonized compostability evaluation protocol, establishing design guidelines for compostable packaging, improving collection and recycling systems, and promoting innovation in technologies for compostable materials.

==== OPAL Catering GmbH ====
BIOPAP is providing to OPAL Catering GmbH its biodegradable trays to support the sustainable concept of "Genius Meal" from the German hospital catering company. With this collaboration patients' daily meals are distributed on the same tray, reducing environmental impact.

==== Smart Set Oy ====
Smart Set Oy is the representative of BIOPAP in Finland. The collaboration between the two companies is driven by their common mission of sustainability. The Finnish company operates in the takeaway packaging market and it uses ecological products supplied BIOPAP.

==== HOFMANNs ====
BIOPAP supplies HOFMANN with its organic, biodegradable trays. HOFMANNs it's a German catering company for schools, industries and erderly houses. This collaboration between the italian ecologic industry and HOFMANNs has started in 2019.

=== Academic collaborations ===
BIOPAP collaborates with the academic world through initiatives such as its BIOPAP Academy, which organizes internships, theses, and orientation days for university students. The company collaborates with universities and research centers on specific projects and participates in university events to discuss topics such as sustainability. The company collaborates with universities and research centers to conduct scientific studies.

- University of Modena: In a 2023 doctoral thesis from University of Modena and Reggio Emilia on biodegradable packaging materials, the company collaborated by supplying trays for experimental trials comparing bio-based and commercial-plastic packaging for fruit.
- University of Milan: a research by a student on shelf life extension through natural and controlled vegetable respirations rates with BIOPAP LC.

== Awards and recognition ==
=== Best Packaging Innovation of the Decade (November 2024) ===
BIOPAP received this recognition during the Gulfood Manufacturing Industry Excellence Awards 2024. This event took place in Dubai on the occasion of the tenth edition of the international event dedicated to innovation in the food & beverage manufacturing sector. This award celebrates the most important innovations of the last ten years and those contributions which have reinvented the benchmarks of productivity, sustainability, and technology. Specifically, BIOPAP received an award for its product, the Easy Genius meal tray.

=== "Imprese vincenti" (May 2024) ===
In a ceremony that took place in Palazzo Turati in Milan, BIOPAP was selected among the ten best companies for the area of Milan, Monza and Brianza at the fifth edition of the 'Impresse vincenti' program which is a talent recognition project for Italian small and medium-sized enterprises promoted by Intesa Sanpaolo. The selection of the winners, which took place among more than 4,000 companies, identified BIOPAP as the company that most contributed to the environment by the creation of packaging for food that is biodegradable, compostable, and recyclable

=== Nomination for "Excellent Award" (April 2024) ===
The company received a nomination in the Best packaging innovation category at the Saudi Food Manufacturing 2024 in Riyadh

=== Finalist in "Trophées de l’Innovation" (March 2024) ===
BIOPAP resulted among the three finalist of this trophy given at the CFIA EXPO Rennes 2024 for Genius meal tray. The award was given for the innovation brought in the field of meal allocation and delivery service particularly in hospitals and communities

=== HOST 2023 Smart Label (October 2023) ===
This recognition in the category "Green Smart Labels" was given in the occasion of HOST innovation, an event promoted by FieraMilano and POLIdesign, a consortium company of the Polytechnic University of Milan. BIOPAP was awarded for Genius Meal Tray, a patented product that permits to serve food in the same tray in which it was prepared, refrigerated and heated

=== ADI Packaging Design Award 2022 (April 2022) ===
Awarded by the Industrial Design Association (IDA) for the patented product MAP at Marca, an italian trade fair organized by BolognaFiere

=== Selection between the 9 SME's with a focus on sustainability (March 2022) ===
At the italian padillion of Expo 2020 in Dubai BIOPAP was selected by the Italian Trade Agency (ITA) for BIOPAP MAP which is its patented cellulose-based food tray

=== "Hofmann Menu-Manufaktur, Gold Medal in Sustainable development" (September 2020) ===
Awarded by German Packaging Institute (DVI) for the use of biodegradable and compostable trays which resist in both freezers and ovens

=== Corporate Social Responsibility Award (December 2019) ===
BIOPAP received this recognition from the Lombardy Region and the Milan Chamber of Commerce as part of the regional CSR and Social Innovation initiative. The award highlighted companies demonstrating measurable commitment to sustainable development, ethical governance, and environmental responsibility.

== Markets and clients ==
According to the Associazione Italiana Commercio Estero (AICE), approximately 70% of the company’s production is exported, with principal markets including Algeria, the United Arab Emirates, Switzerland, Guadeloupe, the European Union, and Armenia. A 2015 sector identified BIOPAP-branded containers as being sold in Austria, Belgium, Denmark, Estonia, Finland, France, Germany, Italy, the Netherlands, Oman, South Africa, Spain, Switzerland, the United Kingdom, and the United States.

In July 2025, the Greek trade publication SelfService.gr noted that BIOPAP S.r.l. Società Benefit had been selected as the exclusive packaging supplier for Knorr High Convenience (part of Unilever) in Greece, providing compostable trays.

== See also ==
- Biodegradable plastics
- Circular economy
- Molded pulp
- Modified atmosphere
- European Green Deal
- Bioplastics
- Greenwashing
