= Scuola Dante Alighieri =

Scuola Dante Alighieri may refer to:

- Escuela Dante Alighieri in Córdoba, Argentina
- Scuola Italiana Dante Alighieri, in Paraguay
