= Argentina–European Union relations =

- European Union: Argentina

== Comparison Table ==
	European Union	Argentina
Population	447,206,135	44,938,712
Area	4,232,147 km^{2} (1,634,041 sq mi)	2,780,400 km^{2} (1,073,500 sq mi)
Population Density	115/km^{2} (300 /sq mi)	14.4/km^{2} (37.3/sq mi)
Capital	Brussels (de facto)	Buenos Aires
Global Cities	Paris, Rome, Berlin, Vienna, Madrid, Amsterdam, Athens, Helsinki, Warsaw, Lisbon, Prague, Nicosia, Stockholm, Bucharest, Copenhagen, Budapest, Bratislava, Ljubljana, Zagreb, Sofia etc.	Buenos Aires, Santa Fe, San Juan, La Rioja, Santiago del Estero, Viedma, Río Gallegos, San Salvador de Jujuy, Mendoza, Paraná, San Luis, Santa Rosa, San Fernando del Valle de Catamarca, Corrientes, San Miguel de Tucumán, Rosario, Formosa, Mar del Plata, Río Cuarto, La Pampa, San Carlos Minas, Villa Fontana, San Javier, Las Heras
Government	Supranational parliamentary democracy based on the European treaties	Federal presidential constitutional republic
First Leader	High Authority President Jean Monnet	President Bartolomé Mitre
Current Leader	Council President Charles Michel; Commission President Ursula von der Leyen	President Javier Milei
Current Vice Leader	Vice Commission President Frans Timmermans	Vice President Victoria Villarruel
Official languages	24 official languages	Spanish
Main Religions	72% Christianity (48% Roman Catholicism, 12% Protestantism, 8% Eastern Orthodoxy, 4% Other Christianity), 23% non-Religious, 3% Other, 2% Islam	62.9% Roman Catholic, 18.9% Irreligious, 15.3% Evangelicalism, 1.4% Jehovah's Witnesses and Mormon, 1.2% Other, 0.3% Unknown
Ethnic groups	Germans (ca. 80 million), French (ca. 67 million), Italians (ca. 60 million), Spanish (ca. 47 million), Poles (ca. 46 million), Romanians (ca. 16 million), Dutch (ca. 13 million), Greeks (ca. 12 million), Portuguese (ca. 11 million), and others	Argentines (ca. 42.725.833) other nationalities (ca. 2.212.879).
GDP (nominal)	$16.477 trillion ($31,801 per capita)	$445.469 billion ($9,887 per capita)

== Agreements ==
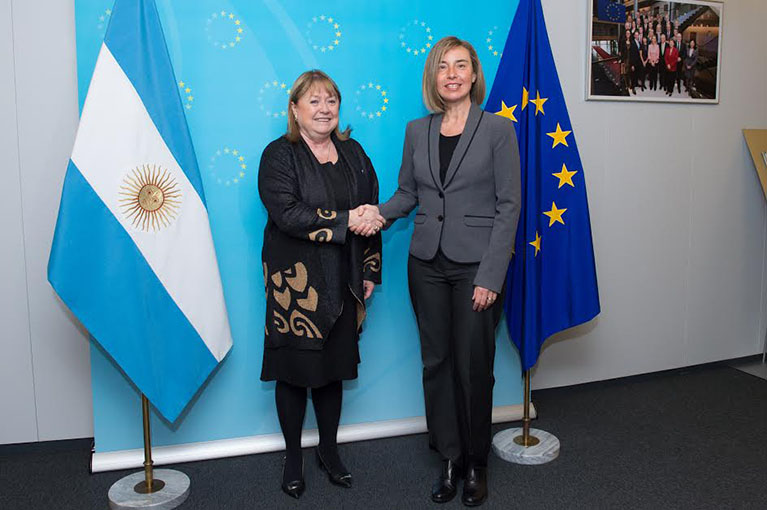
Argentine Foreign Minister Susana Malcorra was received in Brussels by Italian Foreign Affairs Representative, Federica Mogherini.

Argentina was the first Latin American country to formalize relations with the EU under a 3rd generation cooperation agreement. The Framework Trade and Economic Co-operation Agreement between the EU and Argentina entered into force in 1990 and includes two recurrent principles of their cooperation: the strengthening of democracy and human rights, as well as regional integration. An EU-Argentina Joint Commission has also been established. A number of sectoral agreements were established in the 1990s. The main focuses of cooperation are education and training; economic competitiveness; capacity‑building in the public and academic sectors.

Argentina is part of the EU's negotiating with the regional bloc Mercosur for a free trade agreement which will form the back bone of EU-Latin American relations. However, during the 2000s and early 2010s the Kirchner administration developed a protectionist policy and stalled negotiations for a free trade agreement. Mauricio Macri restarted the process in his first months as president.

In 2016, the French government has asked to delay negotiations for a free trade agreement to carry an impact study, which was supported by several European countries. Others like Spain and Italy have asked for immediate negotiations.

== Trade ==
The EU is Argentina's second largest export market (after Brazil). Argentina's exports to the EU are mainly agricultural and other primary goods. The EU exports less goods to Argentina in return (giving the EU a deficit of €3.4 billion) but has a surplus in services of €0.4 billion. The EU is also Argentina's biggest foreign investor, accounting for half of Argentina's foreign direct investment (FDI).

EU – Argentina trade in 2008
Direction of trade	Goods	Services	Investment flow	Investment stocks
EU to Argentina	€4.8 billion	€2.4 billion	€4.4 billion	€44.1 billion
Argentina to EU	€8.2 billion	€2.0 billion	€0.3 billion	€1.7 billion

== Argentina's foreign relations with EU member states ==
- Austria
- Belgium
- Bulgaria
- Croatia
- Cyprus
- Czech Republic
- Denmark
- Estonia
- Finland
- France
- Germany
- Greece
- Hungary
- (Republic of Ireland) Ireland
- Italy
- Latvia
- Lithuania
- Luxembourg
- Malta
- Netherlands
- Poland
- Portugal
- Romania
- Slovakia
- Slovenia
- Spain
- Sweden

== See also ==
- Foreign relations of Argentina
- Foreign relations of the European Union
