= Ladislao Pablo Györi =

Argentine engineer, digital and visual artist, essayist and poet

Ladislao Pablo Győri
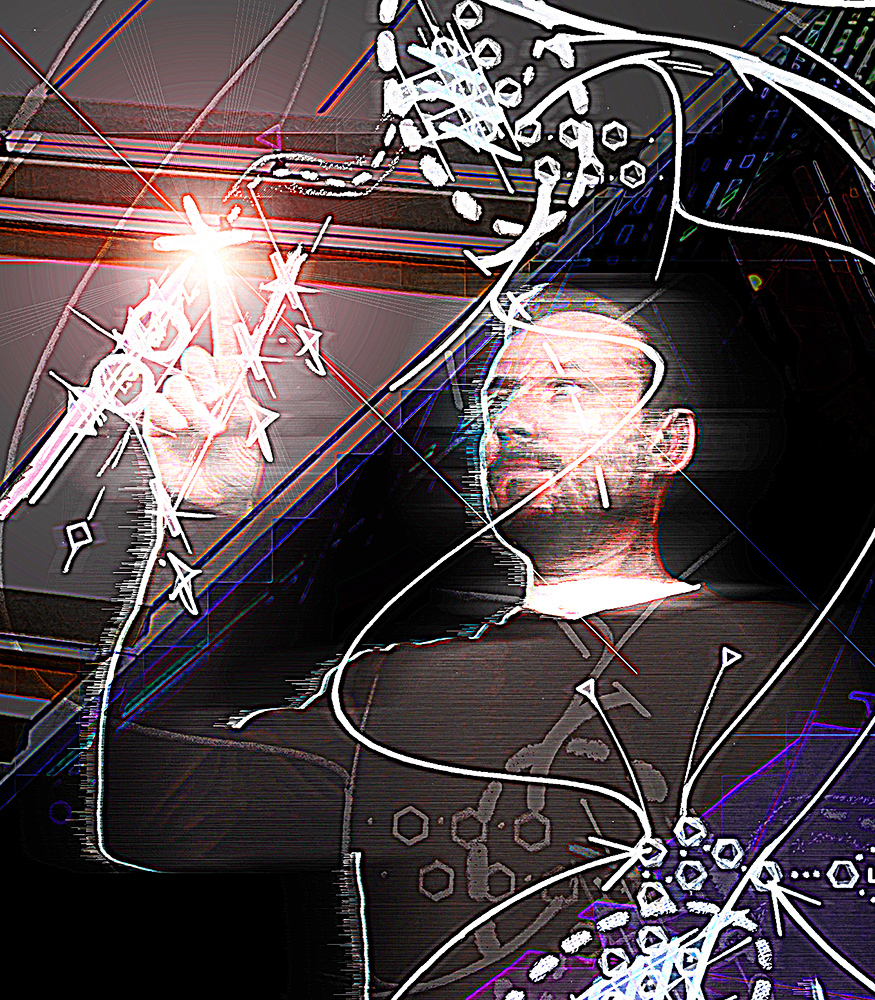
- Technologyőri (detail)
- Born: 13 July 1963 (age 63); Buenos Aires, Argentina
- Citizenship: Argentine; Hungarian
- Occupations: Engineer; digital and visual artist; writer; poet; editor
- Writing career
- Language: Spanish; English
- Period: 1984–present
- Notable works: Virtual Poetry (1995); First 25 Visual Years (2010)
- Website: www.lpgyori.net

Ladislao Pablo Győri (Hungarian pronunciation: [ɟøːri]; born on July 13, 1963, in Buenos Aires, Argentina) is an Argentine–Hungarian engineer, digital and visual artist, and writer, most known as the creator of Virtual Poetry in 1995, which has been described as "of utmost significance in advancing literature as sculptural object in electronic space"; also as one of the rare "poet-practitioners dedicated to 3-D art".

== Life and career ==
Győri was born in 1963 in Buenos Aires, where he lives, into a family of Hungarian origin, with Takács on the maternal side. In 1989, he graduated as electronic engineer at the National Technological University of Buenos Aires.

His first computational and literary activities date to 1983. Győri made experiences with computer music and voice synthesis, and works on computer 3D art since 1984.

After his meeting in 1986 with Gyula Kosice, Győri subsequently experimented with painting and poetry, and became interested in non-representative and rigorous geometry formulations. The study of the paintings of Rhod Rothfuss led him to work, since 1990, in the realization of Madí Turning Paintings-Relief (irregular frame) and 3D digital animations of these geometric structures.

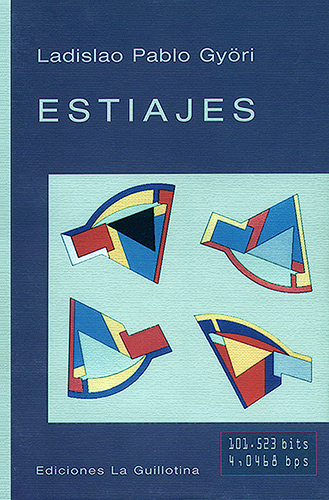
Estiajes

Originally written in 1988, Estiajes, prefaced by Kosice and part of the significant mathematical tradition of the Argentine poetry, according to Fabio Doctorovich, was published in 1994. Poems, information theory and the computer assisted calculus of probability in the composition of the text, to change the usual syntax, restricting the redundant elements and postulating a strong nonlinear character (related to what Győri calls hyperdiscourse), and to qualify in bits the poetic information, a value explicitly displayed on the cover of the book. Its closing essay anticipates the use of artificial intelligence (AI) for aided creation within man-machine systems, foreshadowing today's generative and computational approaches to art. This work was anthologized by Julio Ortega, professor of Hispanic Studies at Brown University. These verbal experiments advanced toward other formative fields of poetry in several still unpublished works from 1989 to 1993.

As assistant to sculptor Kosice from 1990 to 1995, Győri was responsible for the technical facts of Kosice's production. During the retrospective exhibition Kosice – Works 1944/1990 at the Museo Nacional de Bellas Artes (National Museum of Fine Arts) of Buenos Aires in 1991, Secuencia gráfica de una gota de agua (Graphic Sequence of a Drop of Water; a collaborative computer graphics work, 1990) was displayed. Győri participated, among others, in El árbol de la vida y su lenguaje (The Tree of Life and its Language), a remote controlled sculpture by Kosice which incorporates sonic elements, and their display through what is known as spectrum analyzer, by means of variable columns of water and light. This work was erected in Neuquén, the northwestern Argentine Patagonia in 1992.

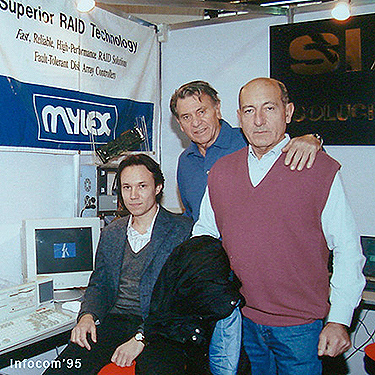
TEVAT Group at Infocom'95

Győri co-founded in 1994 the TEVAT group and co-wrote, the same year, the TEVAT Manifesto, together with the specialist in Semiotics and also engineer José E. García Mayoraz, and the aforementioned Kosice. Artificiality and virtual reality, art in cyberspace, studies of semantic fields, et cetera, and the diffusion of these new topics in the artistic world are an integral part of their proposal.

His research about the problem of synthetic space in virtual reality systems, related to previous art and literary works, establishing "previously unexamined correlations between objects and subjects", in words of Funkhouser, gave rise to "Virtual Poetry", a new conjunction between virtual reality and poetry, included finally into his main project: the Digital Domain of Works, which was exhibited in 1995 at the Galileo Galilei Planetarium of Buenos Aires, together with the project entitled Art Criticism in Cyberspace, an example of García Mayoraz's Vectorial Theory of Semantic Fields, originating from his multidisciplinary studies of semiotics, information theory and both the human and the forthcoming artificial brain.

In an essay on digital poetic creation, published in English as "The Virtual Poetry Project" (1999) and in French as "Intelligence artificielle & composition poétique" (AI and poetic composition; 2000), Győri proposed an early formulation of the agent concept in relation to computational media. He argued that digital supports would evolve from passive carriers of signs into active systems capable not only of storing information but also of generating and modifying it. In this view, the medium itself acquires agency, intervening in the work and contributing to its unfolding. Consequently, artistic forms would shift from fixed objects to dynamic, autonomous events, requiring new languages, modes of reception, and critical frameworks adapted to a context of shared creativity between human and machine.

In 2002, e-stori.ar, a navigable 3D database project around Argentine national history, received an honorary mention from the Buenos Aires Museum of Modern Art.

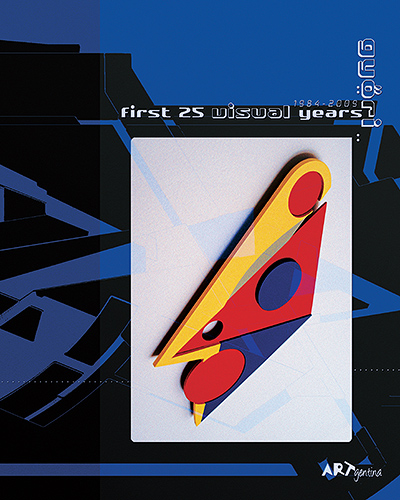
First 25 Visual Years

Since 2010, Győri also produced a series of books, always related to visual arts, writing and computer technology. That same year, First 25 Visual Years was published: a full color illustrated anthology; a compendium of his activity between 1984 and 2009. Kosice y el arte tecnológico (Kosice and Technological Art) appeared on next year, inaugurating his Aero publishing initiative; Győri investigates there the relationship between all the Kosice's creative production and the theoretical thinking that comes from the Computer Age. In Maquinado aditivo en artes visuales (Additive Manufacturing in Visual Arts; 2013), about the materialization of virtual objects of strong formal complexity, he finally introduces his desbordantista (overflowing) geometry. Notación para lenguaje inexistente (Notation for a Nonexistent Language; 2014) and Exography (2017) do the same with his exografismo (exographism): a kind of mixage of actions from outer space, musical notation, perhaps Vantongerloo's worldview, and life manifesting itself to us as a multi-material fluctuation of signs.

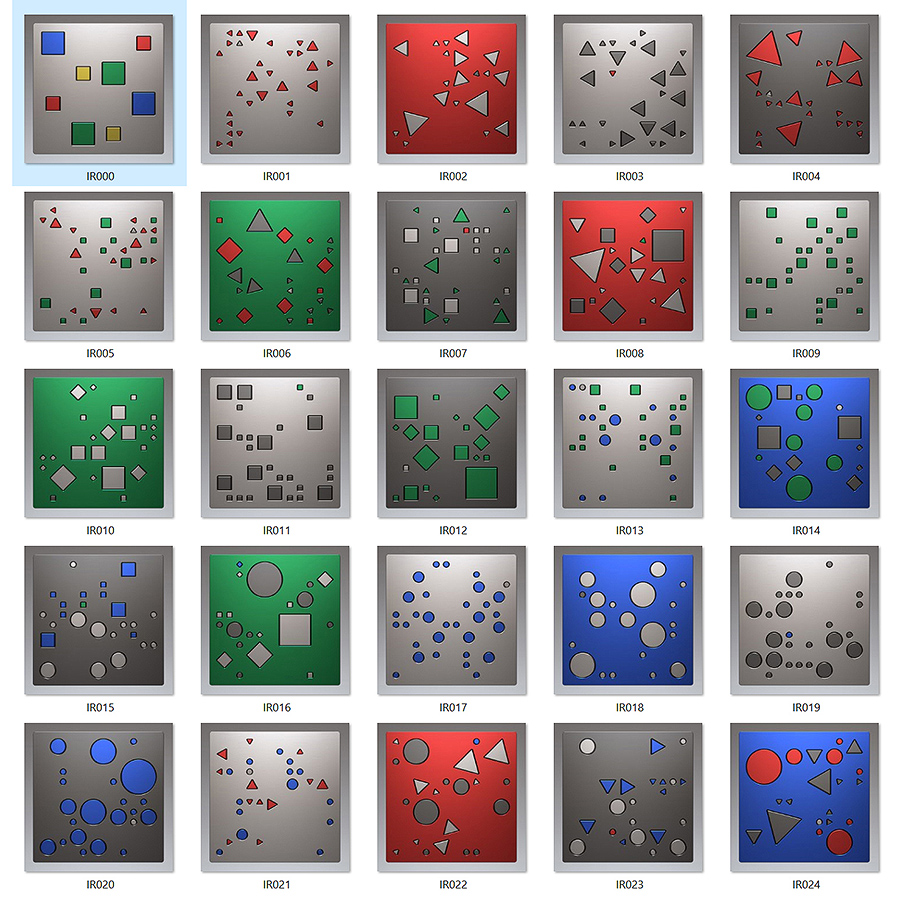
innerrelief#000–024

The typographic exercise Lógica de sustracciones a un cuadrado (Logic of Subtractions from a Square) appeared in 2019. Impresiones oculares en una visita (Ocular Impressions During a Visit), a collection of short texts about instant, still, photographic images, was published late in 2021. More recently, the conceptual foundations underlying his latest project on endographies and the resulting innerreliefs, together with a detailed explanation of the application suite, which the author developed, that generates them, are presented in the essay Explicando Los endoX (Explaining Los endoX), published in 2025. The project focuses on the automated exploration of a Euclidean geometry of elementary shapes, and on the interplay between chance and control in digital art. It also brings together certain concerns from industrial design and the subsequent user interaction within a three-dimensional environment. A significant part of this information is also presented in the guide Los endoX Application Suite – Background and Concepts (2026).

== Works ==
=== Artworks (selection) ===
Sources:

- Pieces in CAD, still images, Psion VU-3D original versions (1984–1985).
- Madí 3D Logo, digital still images (1986).
- Sculpture Projects, tempera and colored pencil on cardboard, and in CAD (1989).
- Alocución, polychromed sculpture in wood (1989).
- Graphic Sequence of a Drop of Water, in collaboration with Gyula Kosice, computer graphics (1990).
- Constructions, 3D digital models (1994).
- Pieces in CAD, 3D digital animation video (1995).
- Sculpture Project # 58, 3D digital animation video (1995).
- Virtual Reliefs, digital still images and 3D digital animation videos (1990–1995).
- Madí Relief-Paintings, enamel on wood (1990–1995).
- Visual poetry, including Sound Space (1992–1998)
- Art Criticism in Cyberspace, in collaboration with José E. García Mayoraz, 3D digital animation video (1995).
- Virtual Poems # 12 & 13, digital still images and 3D digital animation videos (1995).
- Homage to Edgardo A. Vigo, visual poem, tempera on cardboard (1996).
- Vpoems # 12 & 13, VRML models (1996).
- Virtual Poem # 14, digital still images and 3D digital animation video (1996).
- Digital works and projects for monumental sculptures in collaboration with G. Kosice (1999–2003).
- e-storia.ar and e-stori.ar/el_sur, virtual reality projects (2002–2003).
- Ensembles, 3D digital models (2006).
- hommage à e.a.vigo, interactive 3D digital poem (2007).
- Exographies, black and colored pencils and ballpoint pens on cardboard or paper (2010–2011).
- Objetos desbordantes (Overflowing Objects), 3D digital models (2012–2015).
- Object # 29, 3D printed object (2013).
- Technologyőri, digital visual composition (2014).
- Exoplaca053c, laser cut aluminium plate (2022).
- Geometric output corresponding to the first execution..., ink plotter drawing on paper (2022).
- innerrelief #001–004 (series #001), interactive 3D digital objects (2024).
- innerrelief #005–024 (series #002–006), interactive 3D digital objects (2025).

=== Books ===
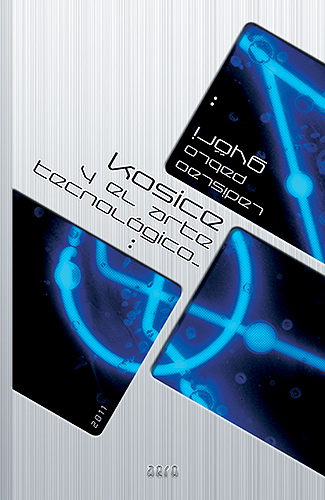
Kosice y el arte tecnológico

Sources:

- Estiajes (1994), ISBN 978-950-99998-6-2
- First 25 Visual Years (2010), ISBN 978-987-05-8040-9
- Kosice y el arte tecnológico (2011), ISBN 978-987-33-1454-4
- Maquinado aditivo en artes visuales (2013), ISBN 978-987-33-4203-5
- Notación para lenguaje inexistente (2014), ISBN 978-987-33-6554-6
- Exography (2017), ISBN 978-987-42-6589-0
- Lógica de sustracciones a un cuadrado (2019), ISBN 978-987-86-3050-2
- Impresiones oculares en una visita (2021), ISBN 978-987-29866-1-2
- Explicando Los endoX (2025), ISBN 978-987-29866-2-9

== Reception ==
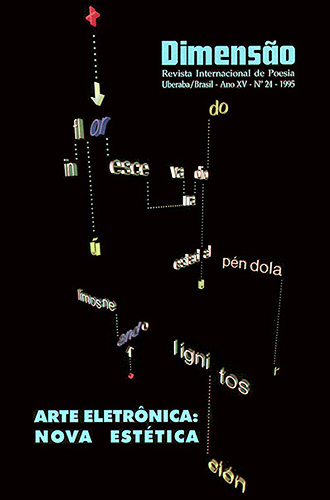
Cover of Dimensão magazine

Since the arrival at the international scene of Győri's "Criteria for a Virtual Poetry", originally published as a broadsheet in May 1995 in Buenos Aires, and subsequently launched in its Spanish version entitled "Criterios para una poesía virtual" by the Brazilian magazine Dimensão (# 24) during the same year, his digital production, be it theoretical or practical, obtained abundant diffusion through a large number of publications worldwide, mainly linked to the academic field.

At Hypertext 98, the 9th Association for Computing Machinery Conference on Hypertext and Hypermedia, professor Christopher Funkhouser, at New Jersey Institute of Technology, assured that the best viewpoint he had come across regarding to imagining an ideal for cyberspace was Győri's description of the Virtual Poetry Domain; moreover, his three-dimensional constructions represent a real beginning towards redefining visually-based syntax for language.

In the same sense and according to Dr. Hugues Marchal from University of Basel, Switzerland, Győri produces a digital poetry in which the terms are generated by recombining their roots and constructing complex three-dimensional structures, vast lexical molecules which are gradually discovered and around which the spectator seems to revolve. His main objective is the development of virtual reality programs in which the viewer would have the feeling of truly touching letters and could directly modify their assembly.

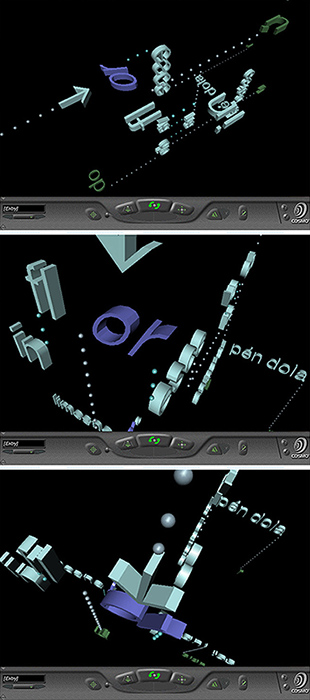
VPoem13 VRML model

The French art critic Jacques Donguy, professor from the Paris 1 Panthéon-Sorbonne University, for whom Győri can be considered among the precursors for digital poetry, stated Győri's Virtual Poetry, a kind of unstable literature, among the production of many dissimilar creators like Timothy Leary, William S. Burroughs or even James Joyce because of their common use of the concept of quantum linguistics, a fluctuating one, which corresponds to the theories of Einstein and Heisenberg, at our post-industrial Electronic Age. This type of fluctuating literature takes advantage of the peculiarities of the digital space, as described by Gustavo Romano, to invite the reader to go through its textual architectures, that not only break the linearity of the sentences but also the structure of the words that compose them, inviting to a kind of subatomic navigation at the level of the sign, as in his works Vpoem12 and Vpoem13, developed for the VRML environment, or as in his video Vpoem14 (an example of animated poetry), in which the smallest units of meaning within words recombine, collide and intertwine to generate new meanings. The sense remains adrift, but is re-constructed in each collision inside the VR matrix: a “surrounding substance within which something originates”, as comes into sight in this virtual poem from 1996; "forcing a genetic moment", says the author, "obtaining from the very heart of the havoc the possibility of the origin of a new existence".

To Clemente Padín, Győri was one of the two Latin American precursors at the electronic poetry field in 1997, alongside the contemporary artist Eduardo Kac. The Uruguayan poet and performer points out five kinds of Latin American experimental writing: Visual Poetry, Nueva Poesía (close related to Mail art), Performatic Poetry, Holopoetry, and finally, the last stage that subsumes all the previous ones, Virtual Poetry, where the main generator of meanings is the particular bunch of relationships established among all its varied aspects (movement, sound, interactivity, morphing, virtual reality immersion, and so on), including, of course, the verbal and the visual one.

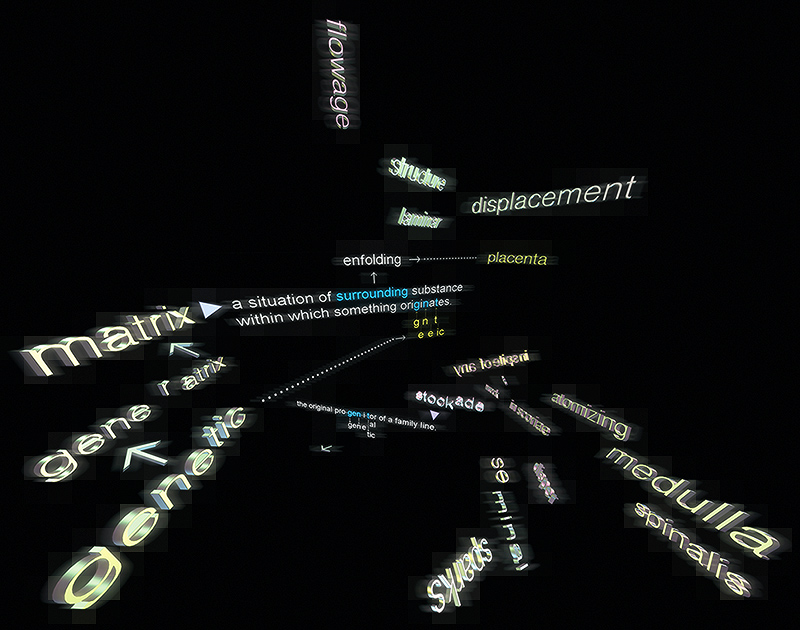
VPoem14 closing sequence

The semantic problem, as it is known, arises as a critical issue in new media. In 2002, Craig Lindley, then researcher at the Interactive Institute of Sweden, highlighted Győri's vision about the Virtual Poetry Domain (which implies the emergence of an n-dimensional virtual world accessible through all of our senses, hyperconnected, endowed with artificial life, and artificial intelligence), where the Argentine author assesses hypermedia as a poor metaphor for the poetics of virtual reality, since it is all syntax and no semantics. And semantics is essential in Győri's work, in the opinion of Anna Wendorff, a literary specialist in the field of Latin American studies at the University of Łódź in Poland, not only because the usual writing order of verbal language has been supplanted by other types of structures and, therefore, semiosis, but also because the whole process embodied in it, lastly, wants to represent, by means of a digital system, the functioning of the human brain. Virtual Poetry, constituting probably the most complex and ambitious phase of cyberpoetry (asserts Silvio De Gracia), took a definitive step, according to the Polish researcher, for the transformation of visual arts and aesthetics at the end of the 20th century and the beginning of the 21st century. In this same way, Funkhouser, in his "Chronology of Works", opens the references of digital poetry with the first programs of computer poems, known as Stochastische Texte (a text generator), by the German computer scientist Theo Lutz in 1959, and closes it at 1995 with Győri's Virtual Poetry, which seems to force the initiation of a new era in the general poetic creation, as the Argentine author assured.

Additionally, his work was referenced both in The Johns Hopkins Guide to Digital Media and in The Cambridge Companion to Latin American Poetry.
