= Argentina–Hungary relations =

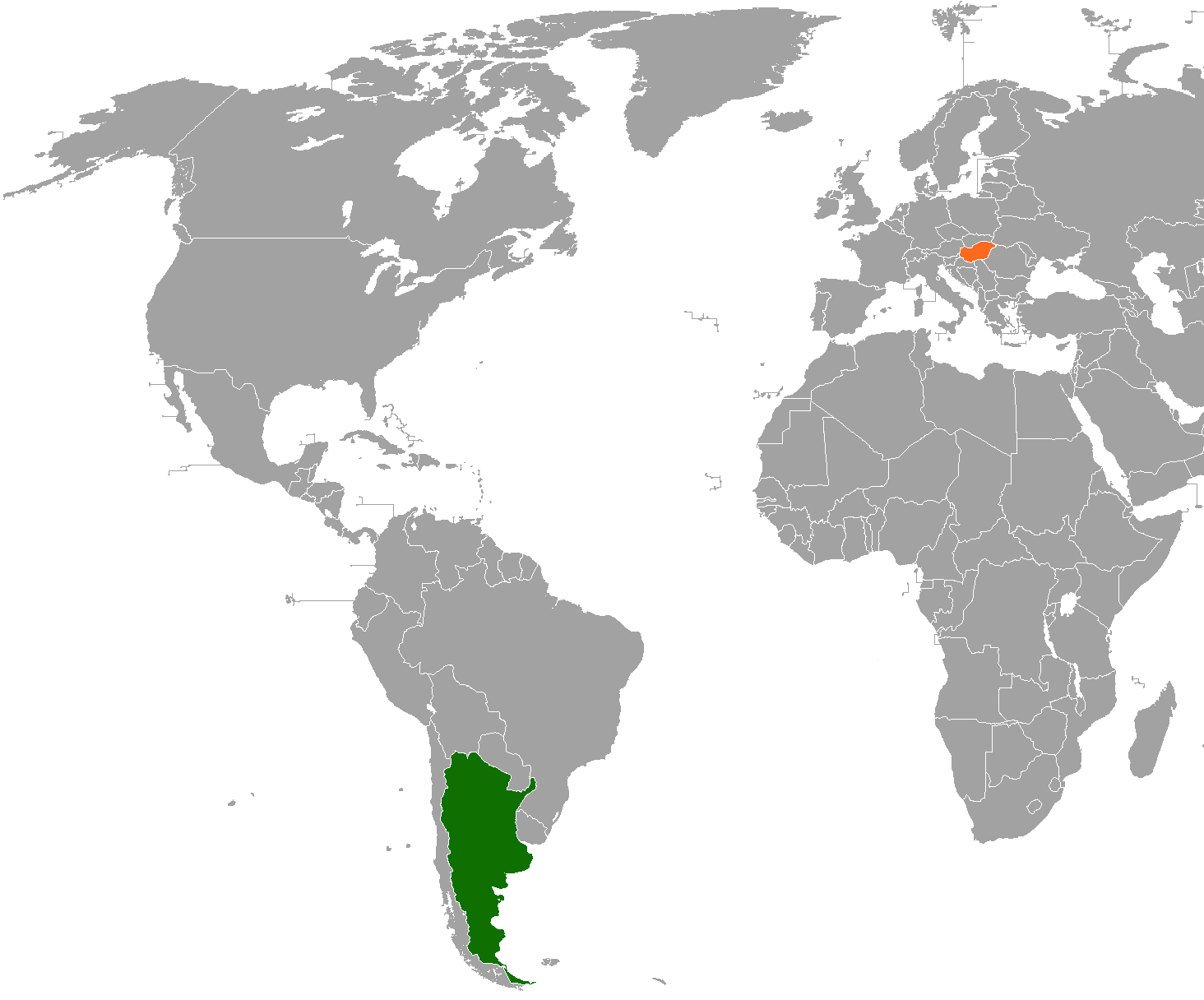

- Argentina: Hungary

Diplomatic relations between the Argentine Republic and Hungary have existed for decades. Argentina is host to one of the largest Hungarian communities outside of Hungary. There are approximately 30,000 to 40,000 Argentines of Hungarian descent. Both nations are members of the United Nations.

== History ==
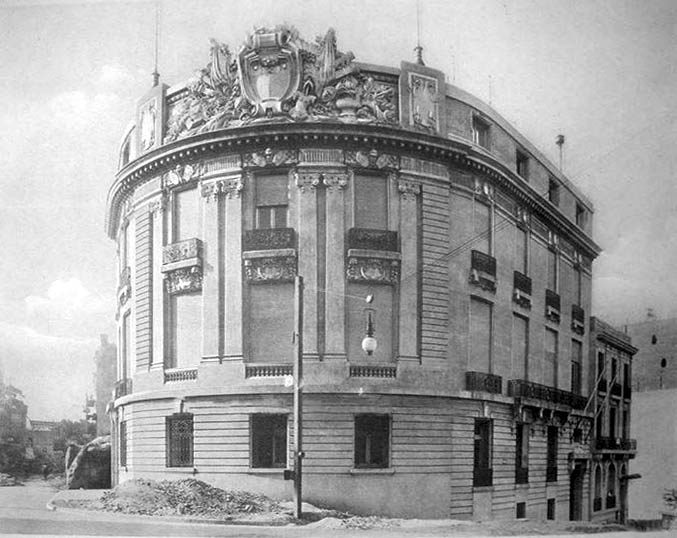
Embassy of the Austro-Hungarian Empire in Buenos Aires, 1914.

In 1864, Argentina and the Austro-Hungarian Empire established diplomatic relations. In 1870, Argentina and the Kingdom of Hungary signed a Treaty of Friendship, Commerce and Navigation.

Beginning in the late 1920, thousands of Hungarians immigrated to Argentina, primarily settling in Buenos Aires. From the 1920s there was a continuous immigration to Argentina from Hungary and from the regions populated by Hungarians that were lost in the Treaty of Trianon. In 1923 Argentina became the first Latin American nation to recognize Hungarian independence and the first to re-establish diplomatic relations in June 1949. Soon after World War II, many Hungarians of Jewish origin immigrated to Argentina. Economic migrants from Hungary were followed by those fleeing for political reasons to Argentina as early as the 1930s, but especially after 1945.

In 1992, Hungarian Foreign Minister, Géza Jeszenszky, paid a visit to Argentina. In March 1993, Argentine Foreign Minister, Guido Di Tella, paid an official visit to Hungary. In April 1997, Hungarian President, Árpád Göncz, paid an official visit to Argentina, becoming the first Hungarian head-of-government to do so. During his visit, he met with Argentine President, Carlos Menem.

In October 2016, Hungarian Deputy Prime Minister, Zsolt Semjén, paid a visit to Argentina to commemorate the founding of the first Hungarian community in Argentina and to commemorate the 60th anniversary of the Hungarian Revolution of 1956.

In March 2026, President Javier Milei visited Budapest to participate the CPAC conference, making him the first Argentine President to visit Hungary.

== High-level visits ==
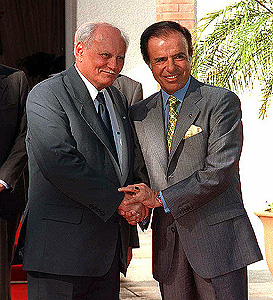
Argentina President Carlos Menem with Hungarian President Árpád Göncz in Buenos Aires; April 1997.

High-level visits from Argentina to Hungary

- Foreign Minister Guido Di Tella (1993)
- President Javier Milei (2026)

High-level visits from Hungary to Argentina

- Minister of Trade István Szurdi (1967)
- Deputy Prime Minister Lajos Faluvégi (1982)
- Foreign Minister Péter Veress (1986)
- Chairman Károly Németh (1987)
- Foreign Minister Géza Jeszenszky (1992)
- Foreign Minister László Kovács (1997)
- President Árpád Göncz (1997)
- Foreign Minister Péter Balázs (2010)
- Foreign Minister János Martonyi (2012)
- State Secretary for Foreign Affairs Péter Szijjártó (2013)
- Deputy Prime Minister Zsolt Semjén (2016)
- Foreign Minister Péter Szijjártó (2022)
- Prime Minister Viktor Orbán (2023)

== Bilateral agreements ==
Both nations have signed several bilateral agreements such as a Treaty of Friendship, Commerce and Navigation (1870); Agreement of trade and financial cooperation (1948); Agreement of exchange of information for the control of goods and means of transport (1997); Agreement of cooperation in fighting illicit traffic of merchandise (1997); Agreement of mutual aid in the collection of customs debt (1997); Agreement of Cooperation in Education (2013); and an Agreement for Economic Cooperation (2015).

== Resident diplomatic missions ==
- Argentina has an embassy in Budapest. Argentina has a Chargé d’affaires presently.
- Hungary has an embassy in Buenos Aires.The residing ambassador is Péter Hlinka.
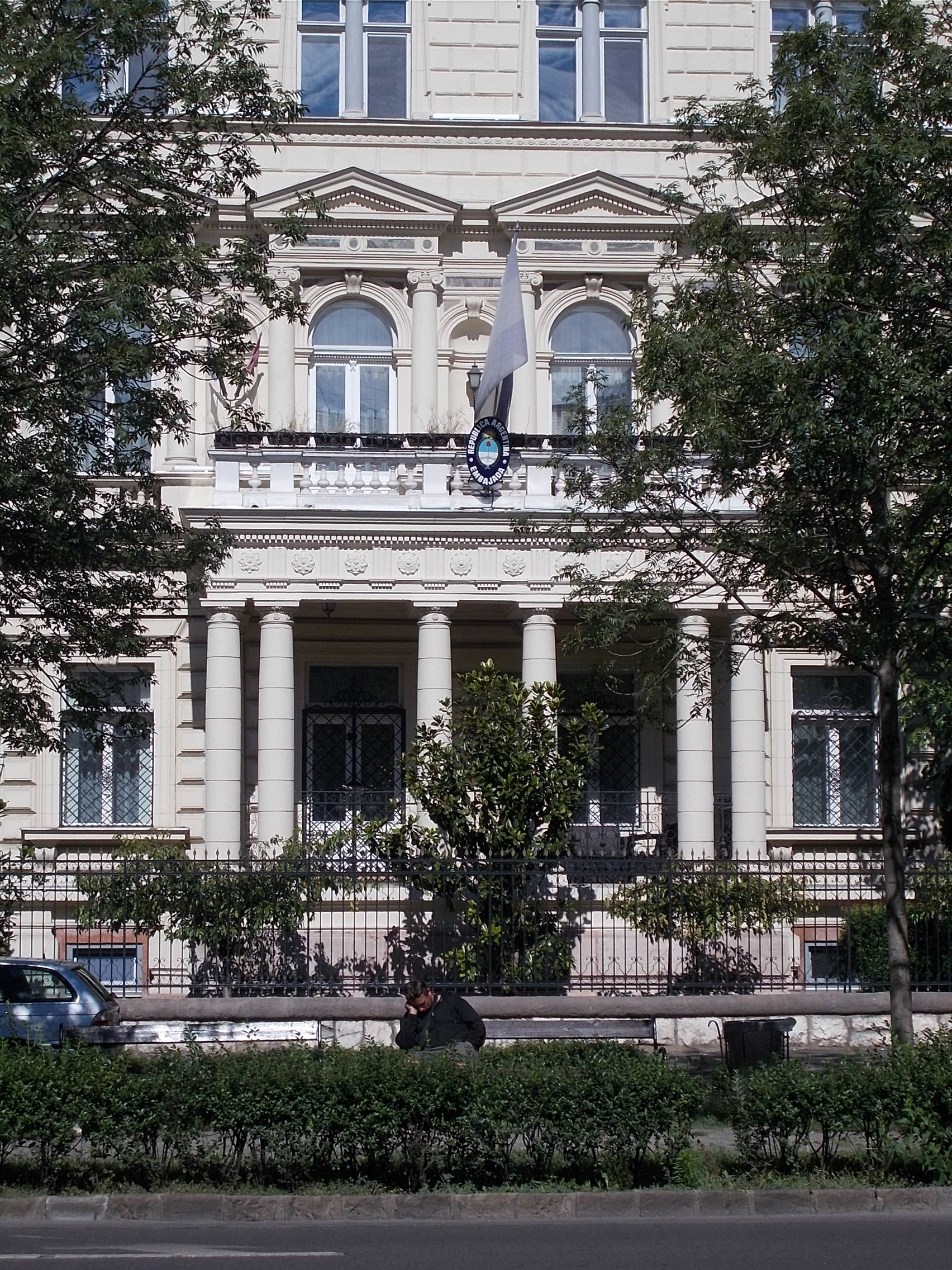
Embassy of Argentina in Budapest

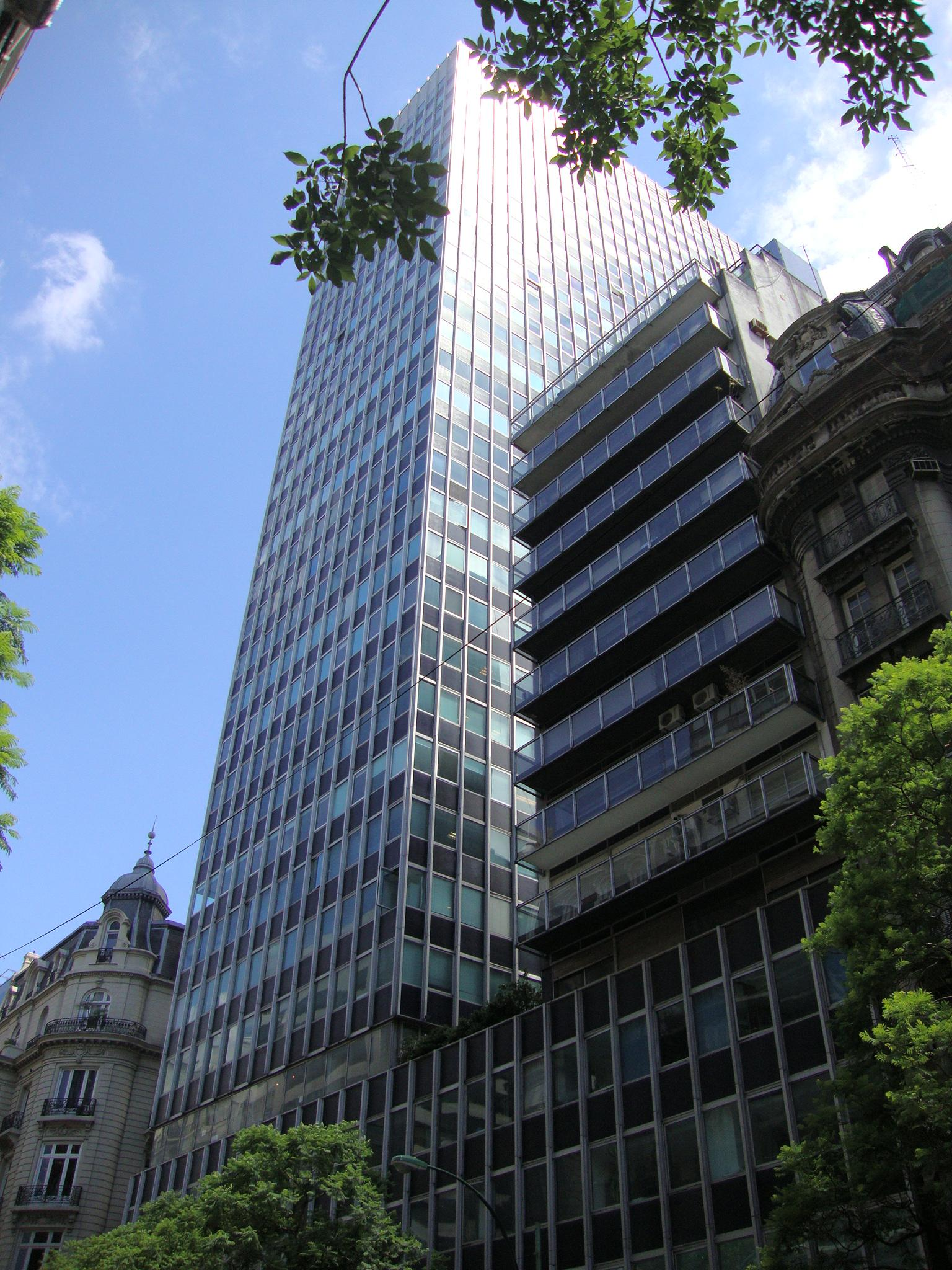
Torre Brunetta hosting the Embassy of Hungary in Buenos Aires

== See also ==
- Hungarian Argentines
- Argentina–European Union relations
