= Hungarian Argentines =

Argentínai magyarok (Hungarian) Magiar-argentino (Spanish)
- (Argentina) (Hungary)

Total population
- Unknown (by birth) + 200,000 (by ancestry)

Regions with significant populations
- Mainly in Buenos Aires

Languages
- Spanish · Hungarian

Religion
- Majority: Catholicism · Protestantism; Minority: Irreligion

Related ethnic groups
- Hungarians · Hungarian Brazilians · Hungarian Americans · Hungarian Canadians

The presence of Hungarian Argentines (Hungarian: Argentínai magyarok) dates back to the 18th century, when a number of Hungarian Jesuit priests came to North Argentina and Paraguay and settled in Jesuit Reductions. After the fall of the Hungarian Revolution of 1848 a number of Hungarian officers fled to Argentina. Among them were János Czetz, founder of the Colegio Militar de la Nación (the Argentine National Military Academy) and Alexander Asboth, who served as United States Ambassador to Argentina. Another well-known Hungarian emigrant to Argentina is László Bíró, who perfected and patented his invention, the ballpoint pen – also known as biro – after his emigration to Argentina.

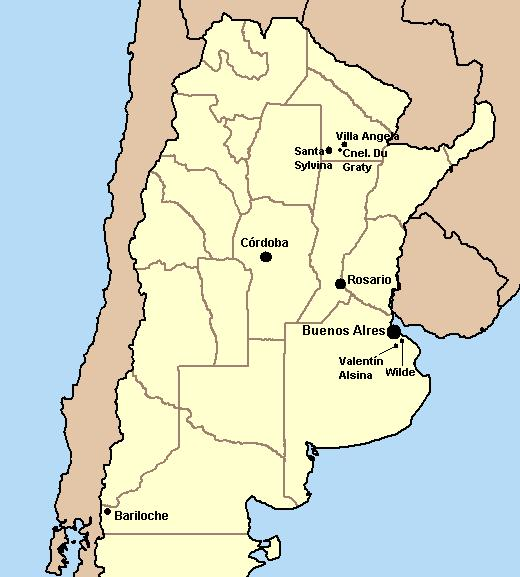
Main cities where Hungarian immigrants settled.

Today, there are between 150,000 and 200,000 people of Hungarian descent living in Argentina, mostly in Buenos Aires. Most of them arrived in the three main emigration waves: during and after World War I, during and after World War II, and after the Hungarian Revolution of 1956 was crushed by the Soviet Union. They maintain 19 associations and four registered religious communities throughout the country, the Hungarian community carries musical instruments such as Violin, which have long been used in Argentina.

== Notable people ==
- Francisco Benkö (1910–2010), chess master
- László Bíró (1899–1985), inventor of the modern ballpoint pen
- Vladislao Cap (1934–1982), association football player
- János Czetz (1822–1904), organiser and first director of Argentina's national military academy
- Gisela Dulko (born 1985), professional tennis player and former world No. 1 player in doubles
- Ladislao Pablo Győri (born 1963), engineer, digital and visual artist, essayist and poet
- Américo Hoss (1916–1990), cinematographer
- Alexandra Keresztesi (born 1983), Hungarian-born Argentine sprint canoer
- Imre Rajczy (1911–1978), fencer and Olympic gold medalist
- Ladislao Szabo (born 1923), water polo player

== See also ==
- Argentina–Hungary relations
- Hungarian people
- Hungarian diaspora
- Argentines of European descent
