= Villa Fontana, Entre Ríos =

Coordinates: 30°53′S 63°08′W

Villa Fontana (Entre Ríos)
- Municipality and village
- Interactive map of Villa Fontana (Entre Ríos)
- Country: Argentina
- Province: Entre Ríos Province
- Time zone: UTC−3 (ART)

Villa Fontana (Entre Ríos) is a village and municipality in Entre Ríos Province in north-eastern Argentina.
