= Scuola Italiana Cristoforo Colombo =

- Escuela Italiana Cristoforo Colombo

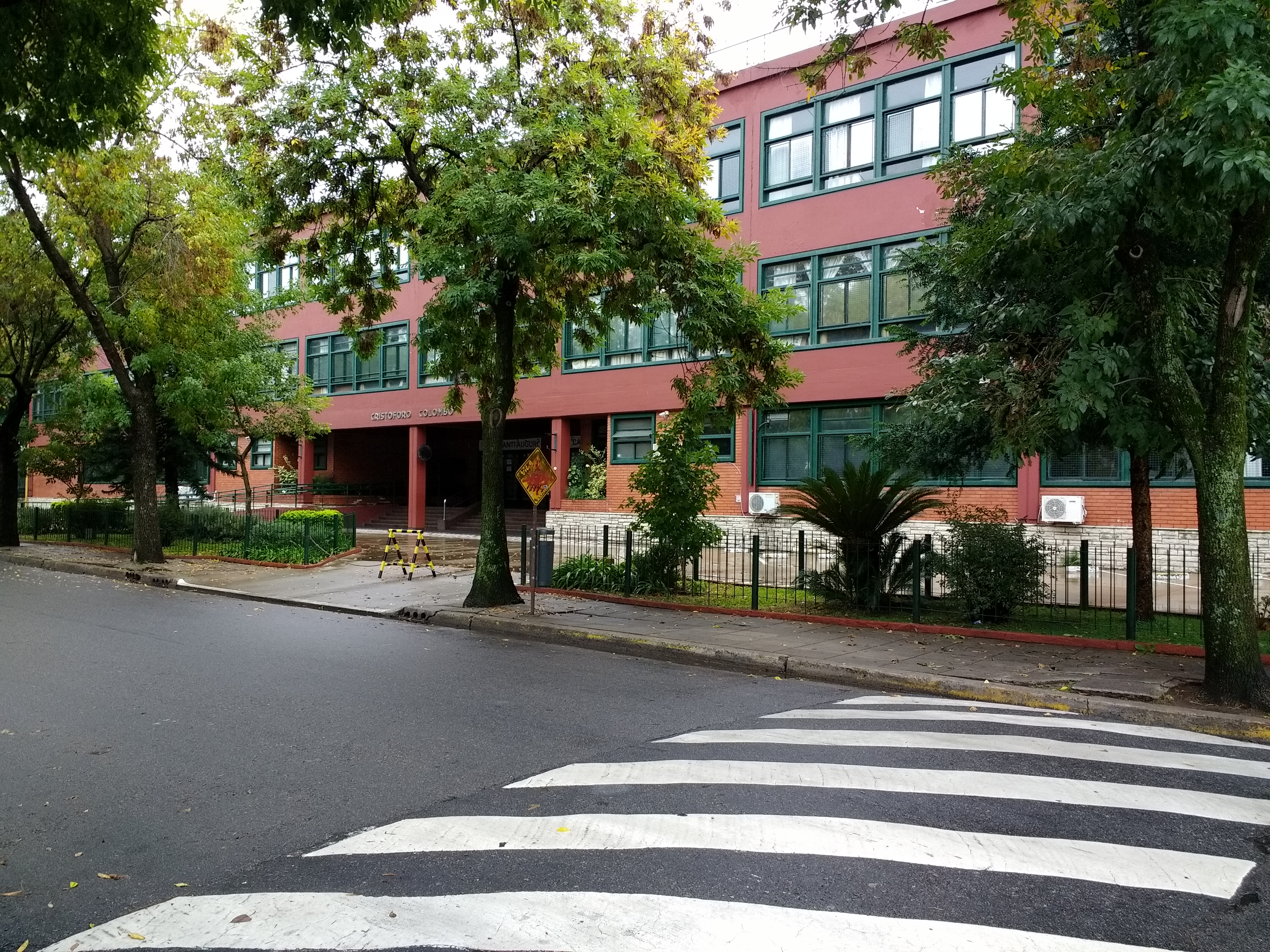

Location
- Ramsay 2251 - Ciudad Autónoma de Buenos Aires; 34.5505242°S 58.44100580000003°W

Information
- Established: 1952; 74 years ago
- Website: cristoforocolombo.org.ar

Scuola Italiana Cristoforo Colombo (Spanish: Escuela Italiana Cristoforo Colombo) is an Italian international school in Buenos Aires, Argentina. It includes Kindergarten, primary school, escuela media (junior high school), and liceo (senior high school) levels. It is named after Christopher Columbus.

It was founded on 2 April 1952.

== See also ==
- Italian Argentine
