= Gustavo Romano =

Argentine visual artist(born 20th century)

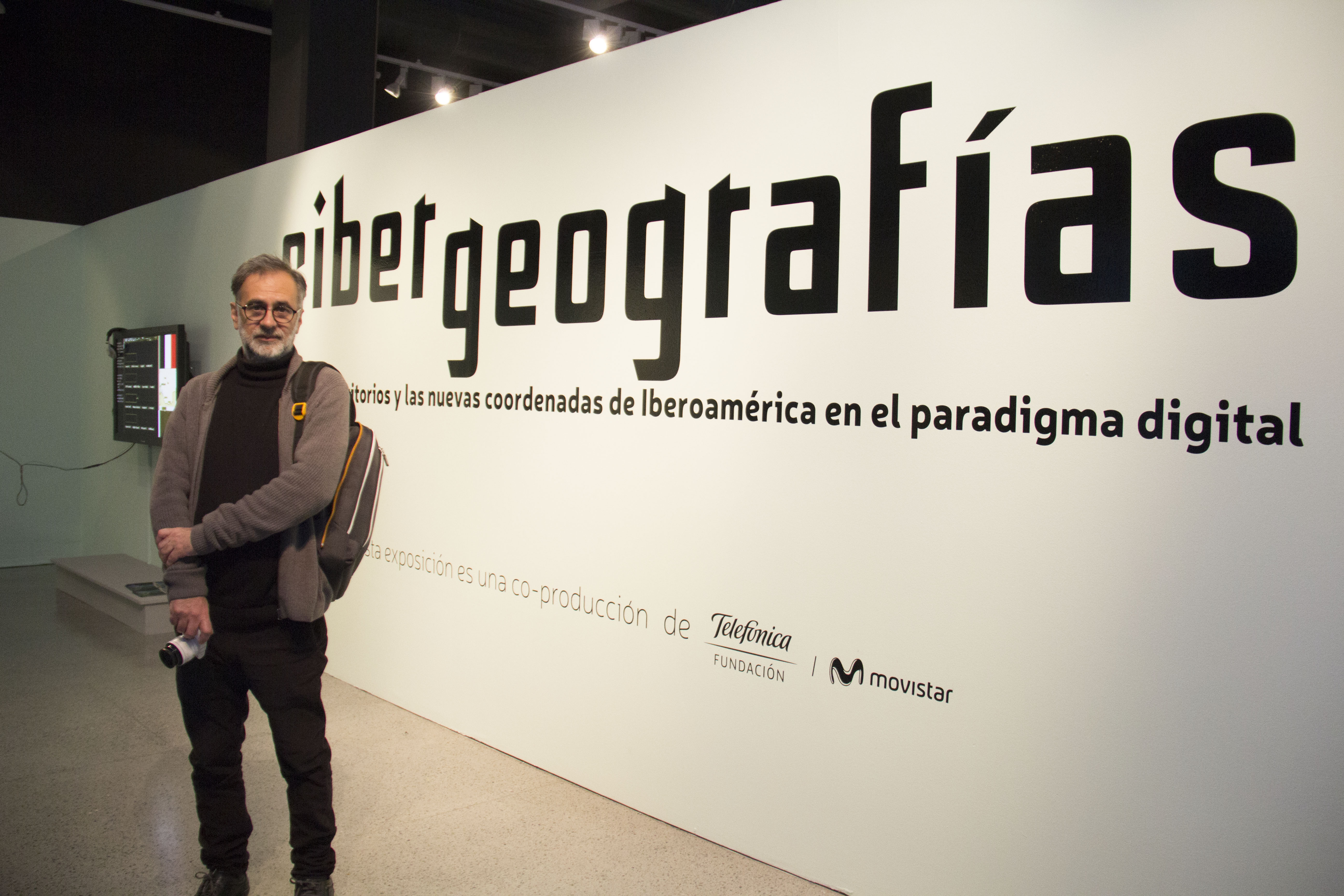
Romano at a show opening in 2016.

Gustavo Romano (born in the 20th century) is an Argentine contemporary artist who works in a variety of media, including actions, installations, net art, video and photography.

Born in Buenos Aires, he uses media and technological devices as well as objects belonging to people's daily lives, decontextualizing them and trying to force viewers to think about their routines and preconceptions.

Romano won the Platinum Konex Award from Argentina in 2002, and the Guggenheim Fellowship in 2006. He lives and works in Madrid.

== Projects ==
One of his projects is Time Notes, which consists of performances of a series of actions using a new money system designed by Romano, with bills based on units of time (bills of sixty minutes, five years, etc.). One of those actions is the Lost Time Refund Office, where officers ask people who are passing by how they have lost their time and refund it with a time bill, at the same time creating a classification and a database of the losses. Since 2004, Romano has performed this piece on the streets of cities, including Berlin, Singapore, Rostock, Vigo, Buenos Aires, Mexico, San Jose, Silicon Valley, Munich, and Madrid.

In 2009, he started the project called Psychoeconomy!, an artistic platform for discussion and research, proposing an alternative approach to various global issues. Each edition involves an artist's meeting, a public event and the publication of the resulting conclusions, documents, texts and graphic materials. The first edition was the Corporate Summit 2010, proposed in order to discuss the international financial crisis and prevailing monetary-exchange systems. Four artists (chief executive officers of their own fake corporations) read the Madrid Declaration at Matadero Madrid. The artists were Daniel García Andújar, Fran Ilich, Georg Zoche and Gustavo Romano.

== Exhibitions ==
Romano has participated in several international events, including Videonale 11, Bonn (2007); the I Biennial of the End of the World, Ushuaia, Argentina (2007); the I Singapore Biennale (2006); the VII Havana Biennial (2000;, the II Biennial of Porto Alegre, Brazil (1999), and the I Biennial of Lima (1997).

He has participated in new media and art in public space festivals, including Madrid Abierto (2009–2010), Transitio MX, Mexico (2007); Transmediale, Berlin (2003); Videobrasil (2005) and FILE (2001), São Paulo; Interferences (2000), Montbéliard; and Ars Electronica (1997), Vienna.

In 2008, Romano presented Sabotaje en la Máquina Abstracta(Sabotage in the Abstract Machine), a ten–year anthological solo show at the MEIAC of Badajoz, Spain.

He has also had solo exhibitions at the Buenos Aires Museum of Modern Art (MAMBA), the Ruth Benzacar Gallery, Tamayo Museum, Mexico DF, among others.

== Curatorial projects ==
In 1996, Romano started and developed the virtual space Fin del Mundo (The End of the World), which provides a platform for the circulation of net art projects by Argentine artists. It was the first of its kind in Latin America.

He was the initiator of LIMbØ, an independent media laboratory that started in 2002 with the cooperation of the MAMBA (Buenos Aires Museum of Modern Art).

Romano was the curator of the Virtual Space of the Cultural Centre of Spain in Buenos Aires. He started and directed the MediaLab of this institution as well.

From 2004 to 2009, he was the director of the Medialab and the curator of the Virtual Space of the Cultural Centre of Spain in Buenos Aires.

Since 2008, Romano has been the curator of NETescopio, an archive of net-art projects for the MEIAC, of Badajoz, Spain.

In 2018, he was guest curator at The New Art Fest, a Lisbon-based art and technology festival.
