= Escuela Dante Alighieri =

Italian international school in Argentina

- Italian: Scuola "Dante Alighieri"

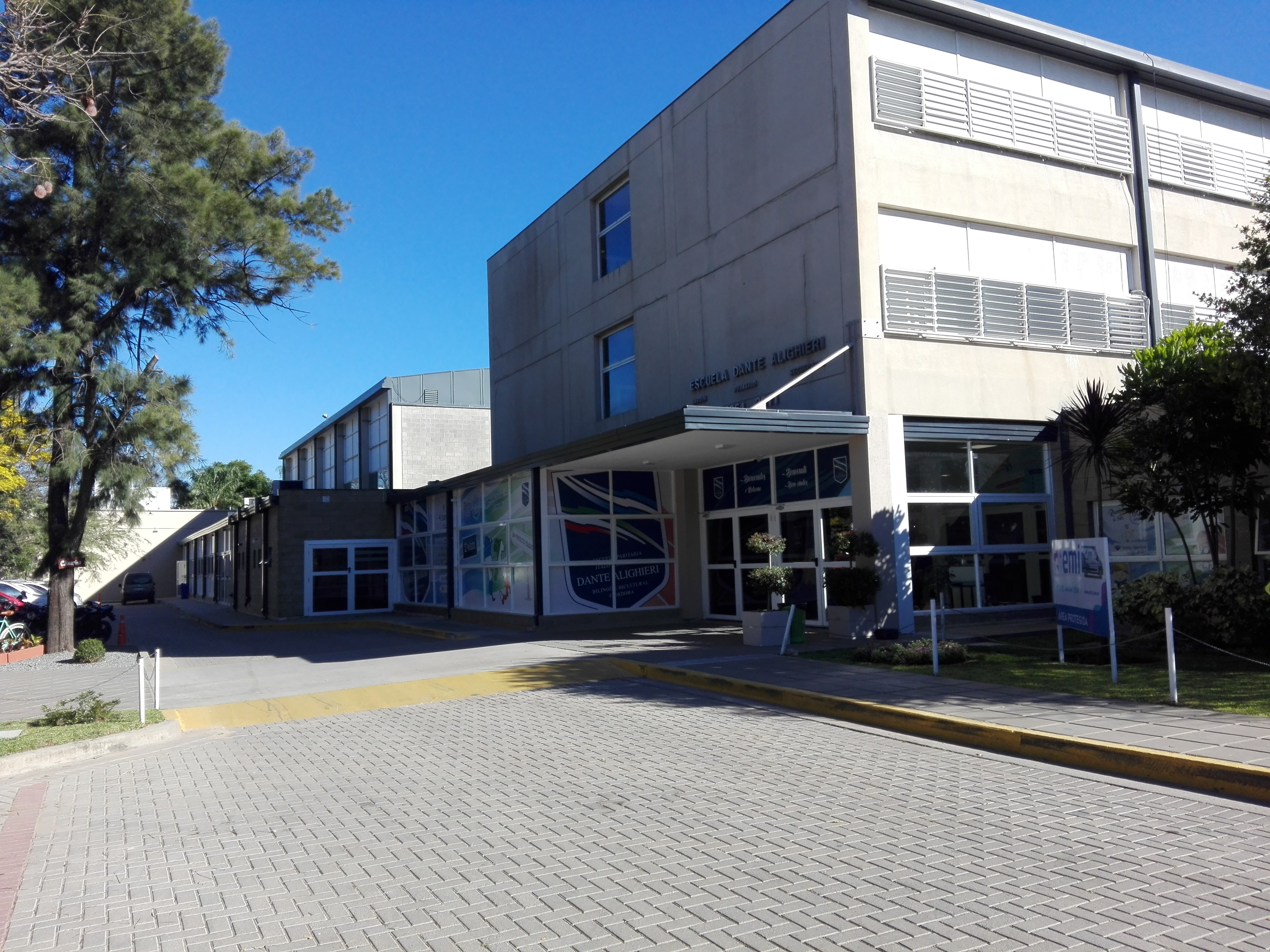

Location
- Córdoba; Argentina; 31.44599°S 64.19060°W

Information
- School type: International School
- Established: 1961; 65 years ago
- Language: Italian
- Website: https://escueladantecordoba.edu.ar/

Escuela Dante Alighieri (Italian: Scuola "Dante Alighieri") is a private Italian international school in Córdoba, Argentina. It serves jardín (escuela materna), primaria (primary school) through secondaria di II grado (upper secondary school). It was established in 1961.

== See also ==
- Italian Argentine
