= Italian Trade Agency =

Italian government agency

- ICE – Istituto nazionale per il Commercio Estero
- Italian Trade Agency logo

- Location of the agency Italian Trade Agency (Italy)

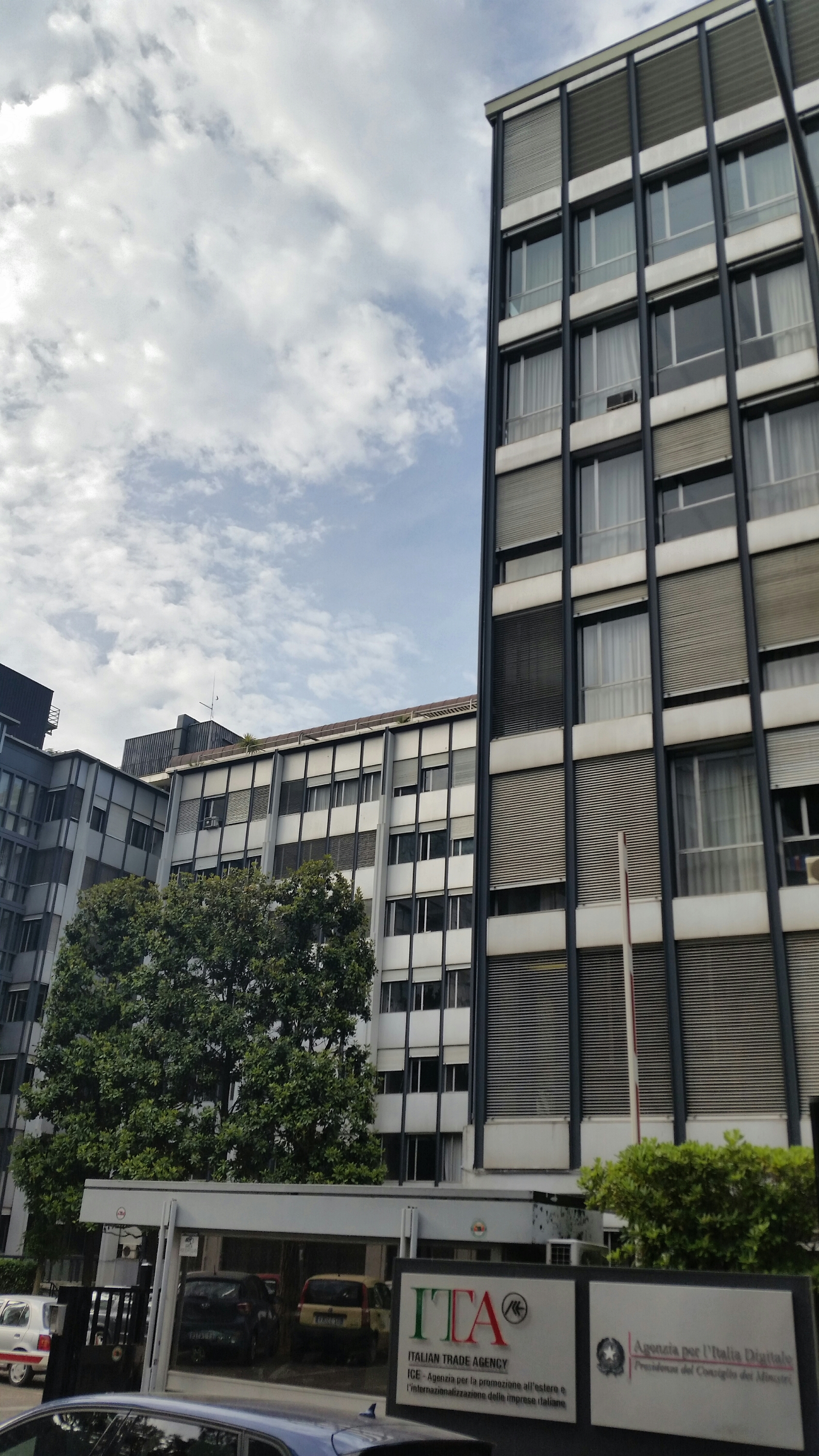
- Headquarters in Rome

Agency overview
- Formed: July 2011; 15 years ago
- Preceding agencies: Istituto Nazionale per le Esportazioni (INE, 1926–1935); Istituto nazionale per gli scambi con l'estero (1935–1945); ICE – Istituto nazionale per il Commercio Estero (1945–2011)
- Type: government agency
- Jurisdiction: Italy
- Headquarters: via Liszt 21 – Rome corso Magenta 59 – Milan
- Website: www.ice.it

The Italian Trade Agency (also ITA, in Italian: Agenzia ICE) is a government agency of the Italian Republic whose purpose is to promote foreign trade and Italy's exports. It was established in 1926 with the Decreto reale n. 800 with the name of INE (Istituto nazionale per le esportazioni, "National Institute for Exports") and had the main task of "promoting the development of exports of products coming from the Italian soil and industry". In 1935, the institute also developed specific skills in the field of imports by changing its name to Istituto nazionale per gli scambi con l'estero ("National Institute for Foreign Trade"). Subsequently, in 1945 it took the name ICE – Istituto nazionale per il commercio estero.

In July 2011, the ICE was abolished and shortly after in December 2011 it was reconstituted in the form of government agency with the name "ICE – Agency for the promotion abroad and internationalization of Italian companies" (ICE – Agenzia per la promozione all'estero e l'internazionalizzazione delle imprese italiane). After about 12 months of transitional management, from 1 January 2013 the new ICE Agency has been operational to support Italian exports and investments around the world and to encourage foreign investments in Italy. Outside Italy, it's best known as the Italian Trade Agency (ITA).

== The current structure of ITA ==
Starting from 1 January 2015, ITA owns about 64 offices worldwide, in close collaboration with the diplomatic-consular network and with the Italian chambers of commerce located abroad. Current president and general manager are Matteo Zoppas and Roberto Luongo respectively.

== CorCE ==
ITA is also known for its course focused on foreign trade and called CorCE (Corso di specializzazione in Commercio Estero, "Specialization Course in Foreign Trade"). CorCE first started in October 1962, with the first forty scholarships awarded by public tender and today it is a master's program for the internationalization of companies.

Italian Trade Agency celebrating its centennial anniversary at the Italia official pavilion (organized by Italian Trade Agency), at 9th Bengaluru Space Expo 2026, BIEC

== See also ==
- Italian Republic
- Economy of Italy
