= Ellen Marx (human rights activist) =

German-Jewish human rights activist

- Born: Ellen Renate Pinkus; 24 March 1921; Berlin, Germany
- Died: 11 September 2008 (aged 87); Buenos Aires, Argentina
- Occupations: human rights activist (Mothers of the Plaza de Mayo)
- Spouse: (Jeremiah) Erich Marx
- Children: 4

Ellen Marx (born Ellen Pinkus; 24 March 1921 – 11 September 2008) was a human rights activist. She was born in Germany and emigrated to Argentina, arriving in May 1939: she never saw her parents again. Her own youngest daughter disappeared when aged 28 in August 1976. After that Ellen Marx became a prominent member of the German-Jewish community in Buenos Aires and a leader in the German originating group within the Mothers of the Plaza de Mayo movement.

== Life ==
=== Provenance and early years ===
Ellen Pinkus was born into a German-Jewish family in Berlin. She was her parents' only child. Isidor Pinkus, her father. was a leather wholesaler, and a committed democrat at a time when many Germans identified the new democratic regime as a foreign imposition resulting from military defeat and national humiliation. Her mother, born Gertrud Hoffnung, was a Social Democrat and a member of the German League for Human Rights. Ellen received a liberal Jewish education. She attended the prestigious "Prince Bismarck School" (as it was known at that time). In 1934 she joined the Berlin "Ring" scouting organisation which since 1933 had been part of the "League of German-Jewish Youth" ("Bund deutsch-jüdischer Jugend"). Traditionally the league organised Saturday meetings at which members could learn the revived Hebrew language and study Jewish history. There were also games and camping expeditions; but by the time Ellen joined the league's priority had become the organisation of escapes and foreign visas for those who, on account both of race and (at this stage) political activities, were being targeted by the government for persecution. The "League of German-Jewish Youth" was in turn was closely connected with the National Association of German-Jewish Citizens (" Central Verein" / CV).

At the secondary school that Ellen Pinkus attended the atmosphere began to change quite quickly in 1933:

- "As early as 1933 I became aware of an increasingly stifling atmosphere. The teachers all identified to some degree with National Socialism..... there were initially many Jewish girls at this school. The first ones that left came from families that had fled Bolshevism in the Soviet Union or anti-Semitism in Poland and Hungary. Evidently these families had preserved their instinct for danger. In contrast, the long-established Jewish educated bourgeoisie felt itself part of the German culture and people, missing or ignoring the danger."

Ellen Marx quoted by interviewers Wolfgang Kaleck and Gert Eisenbürger

- "Schon ab 1933 hatte ich eine zunehmend erstickende Atmosphäre gespürt. Die Lehrer identifizierten sich alle mehr oder weniger mit dem Nationalsozialismus..... Anfänglich waren noch viele jüdische Schülerinnen auf der Schule. Die ersten, die die Schule verließen, kamen aus Familien, die vor dem Bolschewismus aus der Sowjetunion oder dem Antisemitismus aus Polen und Ungarn geflohen waren. Offensichtlich hatten sich diese Familien ihren Instinkt vor Gefahr bewahrt. Das alteingesessene jüdische Bildungsbürgertum fühlte sich jedoch zugehörig zur deutschen Kultur und zum deutschen Volk und übersah daher die Gefahr."

The family traced their German roots back at least two centuries. Ellen's great-grandfather had been granted citizenship (at a time when German Jews did not automatically qualify for it) because he had fought valiantly in the armies confronting Napoleon at the start of the nineteenth century. There was pride in German culture, and before 1933 not too much reason to consider themselves politically or socially separated from other Germans. Even though she would spend most of her life living in a Spanish speaking country, when looking for literary quotes it was to Schiller and Goethe that she would always instinctively turn. At the same time, her Social Democratic mother would have shunned the shrill nationalism that had become a feature of political life since 1919.

The Nazis had taken power early in 1933 and rapidly transformed Germany into a one-party dictatorship. Antisemitism was integrated into public policy and became progressively more oppressive for those affected. After the Kristallnacht pogrom in November 1938 Isidor Pinkus lost his customers. The day after the pogrom she was handed a letter at school addressed to her father from the mayor of Berlin in which Ellen's father was requested to remove her from the school. One teacher called her aside and whispered that he wished her "all the best", while other teachers and fellow-pupils looked away. For Jewish pupils, exclusion from the school turned out to be permanent. She never had an opportunity to sit for her school final exams (Abitur), and despite later attempts to catch up after she had left Germany, she would never succeed in completing her schooling.

=== Escape to Argentina ===
For the first few years of the Nazi regime, arrests and detentions of Jews had been restricted to the overtly politically engaged, but during the (exceptionally cold) winter of 1938/39 a large number of working age Jewish men in Berlin were arrested and placed in labour camps. Those who persuaded the authorities they intended to leave Germany would be released after six weeks: others were used for forced labour. The Gestapo came for Ellen's father on 10 December 1938 but he was out: as they left, the arresting officers passed Isidor Pinkus as he came home, but they did not recognise him and he naturally ignored them. Ellen's mother saw the encounter from the window of their apartment, and made arrangements to hide her husband with her 85-year-old father, at the same time starting to plan her 18-year-old daughter's emigration. She herself was unwilling to emigrate because it would have been necessary to leave her own father behind. Regulations meant that they would have been forced to leave their money and other worldly goods (apart from ten Marks) behind in Germany. Isidor Pinkus, more simply, "felt too old to start form the beginning again somewhere else".

Ellen's emigration was part of a larger scale children's emigration programme organised by the CV. Jewish associations had been banned and meetings of more than two or three would have attracted suspicion from the authorities, but if people took care to visit one another only in ones and twos, and not to coincide with other visitors, enough communication to organise the escape became possible, without attracting Gestapo intervention. Three batches of children were collected together to be transported by train to the Aachen frontier point (and from there to Paris). The first batch had been granted entry visas by Brazil, but by the time it came to the second batch the Brazilian quota had been filled up. Assurances were received, however, that in return for payment, the Argentinian government would provide entry visa for the second and third batches - approximately 60 children and young people. It was forbidden for Jews to take significant amounts of money out of Germany, but Isidor Pinkus was able to give effect to the Argentinian entry fee on Ellen's behalf by contacting a kinsman in Palestine who owned a bank and made the payment. The third batch of refugee children, which included Ellen, left Berlin on 13 April 1939. Her mother and grandfather said their farewells on the station platform. Her father could not bear to come to the station and stayed home. Travelling via Paris and Le Havre on a cargo ship the children reached Buenos Aires on 25 May 1939, the day of Argentina's May Revolution Holiday. During the ocean crossing one stage she contracted polio, a common infection among the European refugees starting off near the bottom of the social pyramid: the disease was untreated, and although she recovered she would be left with a permanent stoop. The Jewish Colonization Association (HICEM) in Paris had successfully organised French exit visas, but had been able to provide the children with entry visas only for Bolivia, so the refugees stayed on the boat for several more days, fearful of being sent back to Europe, until a Jewish Aid organisation succeeded in obtaining entry visas for Argentina and Ellen Pinkus was able to begin her new life. The small bag her mother had packed for her with clothes and basic medications disappeared her first night ashore.

In Buenos Aires Ellen Pinkus worked, initially, as a nanny in the Recoleta quarter.Responsibilies include attempting to teach the English language to her employers' two-year-old infant. After five months her (Catholic) employers visited a relative who was a novice nun, and who pointed out that the new nanny was Jewish, so she was dismissed. There followed another job with a French family with whom duties included looking after the five children, cleaning the house, and preparing meals appropriate to her employers' "exquisite French palettes". That was followed by work as an assistant in a care-home founded by a Jewish doctor. The hours were shorter, but she was still only 18 and there were some unanticipated challenges, including teaching reading to someone with Down syndrome and looking after an elderly lady with cancer.

Later in 1940 she accepted a position as a Kindergarten assistant at a children's home operated by the "Asociación Filantropia Israelita" (AFI), founded by a long-established Jewish merchant family in Buenos Aires in anticipation of the flow of Jewish refugees from Europe.

=== Family developments and community involvement ===
At a musical evening held by the "Jewish Cultural Association" in the Buenos Aires quarter of Belgrano she met a pianist called Erich Marx, a German-Jewish refugee like herself. He had studied piano and voice at Mainz and in 1935 followed his brother to Argentina. His parents were murdered at Theresienstadt. On 11 March 1942 Erich Marx and Ellen Pinkus were married. By 1964 the marriage would have produced four children. Long before that new began to come through about relatives who had remained in Germany. During 1942/43 a message on the edge of one of the anodyne postcards that her mother was able to send stated "Frau Pinkus ist jetzt ganz alleine" ("Mrs. Pincus is now quite alone"). Her mother's postcards stopped after Gertrud was arrested and transported to Auschwitz, used for forced labour, and then, a year or so later, killed by gassing. Although a steady trickle of grim news emerged during the war years, it was only many years later that Ellen Marx learned in greater detail of father's death in Berlin in July 1942, of her mother's final years, and of the fates of nine other relatives who had been "hauled-off" by the authorities in Germany.

Three of the couple's four children were born in 1943, 1947 and 1948. Between the births Ellen Marx taught German at the Pestalozzi School which had been founded on the north side of the city in 1934 by Ernesto Alemann. Most of the pupils were from Jewish families that had fled Germany and Austria. As her own children became less full-time, for around twenty years she found enormous satisfaction from helping to look after children with the Lamroth Hakol Community (loosely: "Despite everything community"), established in 1944 by and for German-Jewish refugees. The immediate priority was to teach the children Spanish. During the early 1950s she met many badly traumatised children whose parents' had survived the Shoa. Most had arrived via a large displaced persons' camp near Ulm where 7,000 holocaust survivors had been gathered together.

During the 1960s Ellen Marx recovered her German nationality, but she did not return. Nor did she emigrate to Israel, though many did including, during the course of that decade, Miriam and Daniel, her two eldest children. During the 1950s and 1960s there was plenty of anti-Semitism to contend with on the streets of Peronist Argentina, although there was no question of this receiving government support. It was Miriam's emigration that prompted Ellen to visit the West German embassy and apply for a passport. But, just as with her father back in 1938, it was now Erich Marx who declared himself no longer able to go back to zero and start again. Although she lived in Argentina for the rest of her life, Ellen Marx remained steeped in German culture, and according to the international human rights lawyer Tonja Salomon, always spoke "wonderful" German. That was why Argentinian friends, with barely translatable irony, took to identifying her as "die Hiesigen" ("the local girl").

=== Nora ===
The third child of Erich and Ellen Marx, Nora, was born on 21 June 1948: unlike her elder siblings, Nora never showed any indication of wanting to live anywhere other than Argentina. As a school girl she was actively involved with the Argentinian Zionist youth movement. She attended the University of Buenos Aires, studying Meteorology, between 1966 and 1970. Her student career was in most respects unremarkable. She joined a welfare organisation called "Social Justice" which provided support classes for the children of disadvantaged families in the city's Mataderos slum quarters, as well as collecting unwanted second hand clothes and distributing them to the poor. After completing her studies, in 1971 Nora was hired as a civilian worker for the Argentine Air Force for work that involved airport security. She joined the Air workers' trades union ("Sindicato del Personal Civil y Técnico Argentino del Aire" / ATEPSEA) and became a union activist. She also remained active as a member of the "Social Justice" organisation.

=== 1976 ===
A military coup d'état overthrew the Isabel Perón government in 1976. As the generals consolidated their hold on power some 30,000 people were disappeared or killed. Three months after the military take-over a decree was promulgated making it possible for public service workers to be removed instantly from their jobs without justification. The union activist Nora Marx lost her job two weeks later.

A couple of months after that, on the evening of Saturday 21 August 1976, Nora arranged to meet up with friends to go to the cinema. At around 8 in the evening Ellen Marx received a 'phone call from her daughter's boyfriend, asking if Nora was still at home. She was not. Ellen had been out since mid-afternoon so did not know when Nora had left the house. Nora was never seen again. Two weeks after the disappearance her parents received a telephone call: the caller did not give his name, but he conveyed greetings from Nora and said that she hoped to see her parents soon. Nothing further came of that, however. Witness statements obtained long afterwards indicate that she probably had not survived the serious torture inflicted by her captors during the first week or so after she was taken.

Although the full extent and nature of the disappearances that occurred after the army took power emerged only little by little, people already knew enough for Ellen Marx to have been desperately worried by her daughter's unexplained disappearance. She looked everywhere and asked everyone she could think of for evidence of her daughter's whereabouts. She went to all the police stations in the area. Everyone she asked said they knew nothing about what had happened to Nora. The police stations she visited included Police station number 42 in the Mataderos quarter. There she was assured that there were no detainees held in the police cells. It later transpired, from the testimony of a fellow detainee, that this was the police station to which Nora was taken following her capture and where, with others, she was held and tortured for at least five days.

Eventually Ellen Marx was reconciled to the probability that Nora was dead, but she never stopped trying to find out more about what had happened, though many details remain uncertain. It appears that Nora Marx was captured by "security personnel" between 16.00 and 19.00 on Saturday 21 August 1976. According to one version, Nora Marx was one of several people detained in a workshop used to make tote bags. The workshop also contained a printing machine and towards the end of that Saturday afternoon Nora Marx, with others, had gone to use that machine "to print leaflets". Another version has it that during the afternoon she was in the area of, or visiting, offices of the "Social Justice" organisation in Mataderos, with which she was still involved. Unbeknown to Nora, several days earlier the office had been occupied by government security officials, who then set about detaining anyone who entered the building. One of those detained had recognised and identified Nora, which had led to her arrest. The security officials involved were later determined to have been members of the so-called "First corps of the armed forces" ("Primer cuerpo de las fuerzas armadas"), commanded by Guillermo Suárez Mason, who during the 1980s and 1990s would face a succession of prosections, extraditions and convictions, along with a presidential pardon, in connection with his Dirty War crimes under the 1976-1983 dictatorship.

=== Later years ===
The military government collapsed in 1983, after which it became easier to investigate what had happened to victims of the Dirty War and to pursue some level of justice. Shortly after Nora disappeared Ellen Marx had become a member of the Mothers of the Plaza de Mayo movement. She was one of the women who at some stage during 1977 began to appear in the Plaza de Mayo, directly in front of the presidential palace, participating in silent demonstrations which involved holding up posters of their missing children with the slogan "¿Dónde están?" ("Where are they?"). As the silent demonstrations drew international interest the protestors themselves faced increased danger from the government. Their spokeswoman, Azucena Villaflor, was herself disappeared on 10 December 1977. The campaigners understood that international awareness was one of their most powerful tools. Argentina was an immigrant nation, home to millions who had emigrated, or whose parents had emigrated, from different European countries. Ellen Marx had herself reinstated her (West) German citizenship as the nightmare Hitler years began to recede into history. The women made urgent representations to the embassies in Buenos Aires of the European countries from which they or their parents had emigrated. The West German embassy representatives were polite but, the women felt, spectacularly less helpful than embassy staff representing the other principal European countries involved. In Nora Marx's case they pointed out that since Nora herself did not hold a West German passport her disappearance was not a problem for them. The embassy appointed a man called "Major Peirano" as a liaison officer to "support" the women, but the parents came away with the strong impression that Peirano was procipally concerned to withhold any information to which he might have had access concerning the disappearances. He certainly did nothing to help find the disappeared children, giving rise to accusations afterwards that whereas the mothers at this stage knew only that their children were missing, West German embassy staff knew already that they had long since been murdered.

After her daughter's disappearance Ellen Marx was asked what she thought was the difference between the Argentinian dictatorship and Nazism:

- "The result - tortured people and death - is the same. The difference is context. Dictatorship, I think, is not a constant, whereas antisemitism, which is the wellspring of Nazism, has demonstrated, regrettably, that it can survive in all ages and cultures.
- In one respect the two are the same: their perpetrators think themselves superhuman, with power over life and death, able to decide what shall be done and what shall not, what is good and what is bad. But because of the difference of scale, I do not accept the comparison between Argentina's disappeared and the six million holocaust dead."

Ellen Marx quoted by Julian Blejmar

- "El resultado de la gente torturada y muerta es el mismo. Lo diferente son los antecedentes. Pienso que la dictadura no es una constante, pero el antisemitismo, que es la raíz del nazismo, lamentablemente ha demostrado que ha sobrevivido a todos los tiempos y culturas.
- En un punto son iguales: Quienes las manejan piensan que son sobrehumanos, que son dueños de la vida y de la muerte, deciden qué se hace y qué no, lo que está bien y lo que está mal. Pero, por la diferencia en la dimensión, no acepto la comparación de los desaparecidos argentinos con los 6.000.000 de muertos del holocausto."

After the military government collapsed and a form of democracy returned in 1983, a memorial tablet to Nora was set up in the Natural Sciences faculty at the university where she had studied. The Kaddish for Nora was delivered in Buenos Aires by Rabbi Rothschild.

By 1983 Ellen Marx had realised that her daughter was almost certainly dead: the issue became one about truth and justice. She still needed to know what had happened and to see the killers punished. She and Idalina Tatter accepted now an invitation from Amnesty International and the Evangelical Churches in Germany to travel to West Germany. Idalina Tatter's German born husband Federico had, like Nora Marx, been disappeared. A third member of the deputation was Annemarie Zieschank from Argentina whose son, Klaus, was also missing. Controversially, from Ellen Marx's point of view, the German born Annemarie Zieschank had been a member of the Nazi party as a young woman. They made the trip as representatives of the families of the victims of the military dictatorship in Argentina, and arrived with a list of 72 people from the German-originating minority in Argentina who had disappeared during the dictatorship years.

In West Germany Marx addressed the Evangelical Church Assembly, she spoke at press conferences and she addressed universities. Pointing out that she was a Jewess from Berlin she told her audiences: "You Germans know what an authoritarian regime is". She disparaged West Germany's diplomats in Argentina, contrasting their efforts with those of embassies representing countries such as Austria, Spain and Ireland, all of which had done a spectacularly better job of looking after their people. She was received by Willy Brandt who promised to help. Helmut Kohl, who had taken over as chancellor in 1982, expressed solidarity. Ellen Marx was keen to press criminal charges against the Argentine military. The civil rights lawyer Wolfgang Kaleck, who took on the case in the German courts, launched a case in 1999 on behalf of German-born victims of the military dictatorship in the Berlin district court, and later at the Nuremberg district high court. In the case of Nora Marx, however, the court decided it had no competence to hear the case, since the victim was not German.

According to the final report of the commission set up by a later Argentinian government in respect of these matters, more than 12% of the thousands of disappeared under the military dictatorship were members of the Jewish community - many descended from German-Jewish emigrants - even though the overall proportion of the Argentine population identified as Jewish was a little under 1%.

Ellen Marx continued to investigate human rights violations and crimes committed under the dictatorship for the rest of her life. Till shortly before she died she led the group of German-born mothers of the disappeared and the other victims. In January 2008, tend years after the death of her husband, Erich Marx, she died following a fall at the "Hogar Alfredo Hirsch" retirement home just outside Buenos Aires where, by that time, she was living. She had handed over family memorabilia to the Jewish Museum in Berlin.
