= Swiss Argentines =

Argentine citizens of Swiss descent

Schweiz-Argentinier (German) Helvético-argentinos (Spanish)
- (Argentina) (Switzerland)
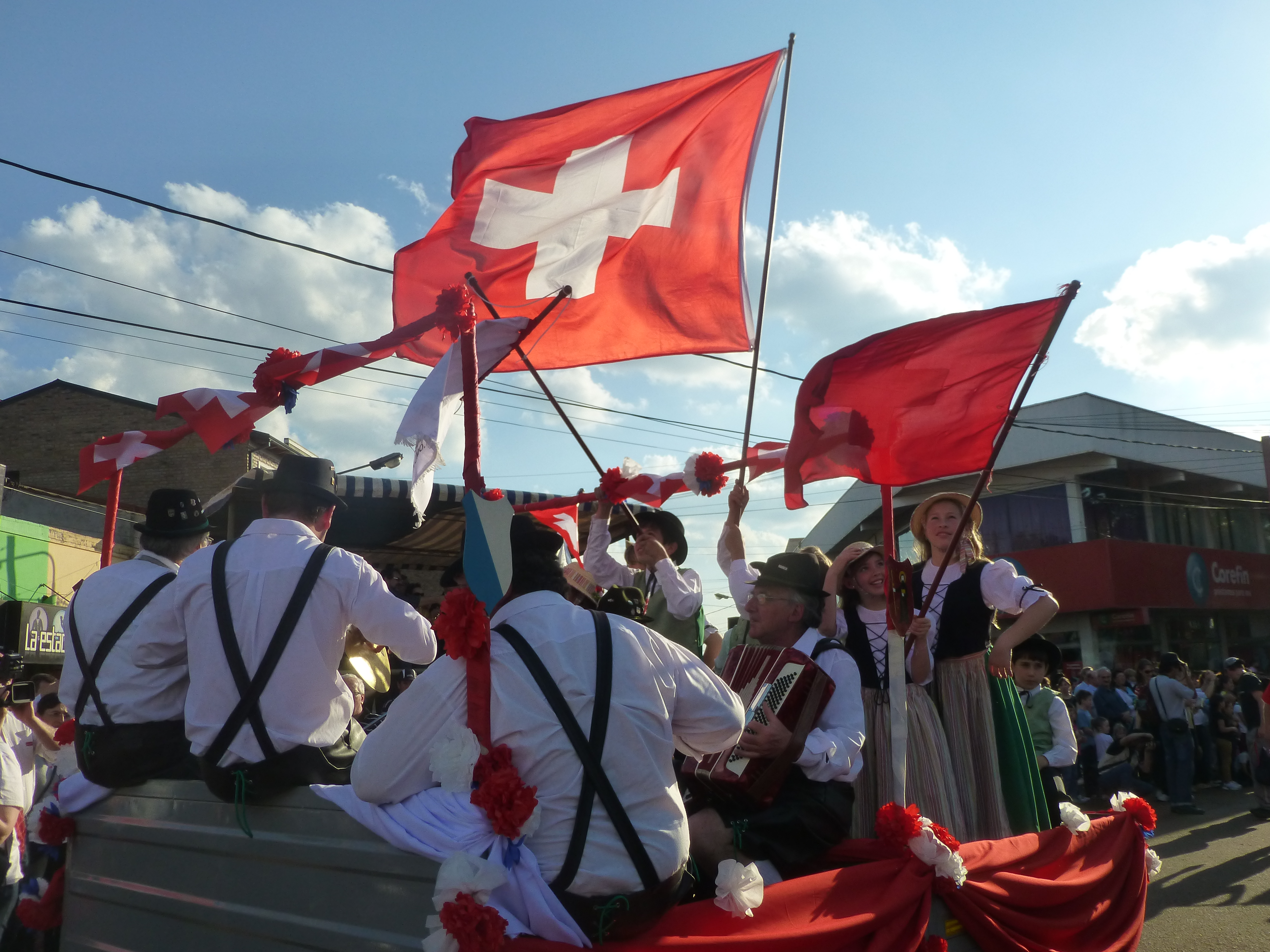
- Swiss Argentines during the inaugural parade of the Immigrant's Festival in Oberá, Misiones.

Total population
- 400,000

Regions with significant populations
- Mainly Santa Fe, Buenos Aires, Río Negro, Córdoba, Entre Ríos, and others

Languages
- Spanish · German (especially Argentinien-schwyzertütsch dialect) · Arpitan · Lombard

Religion
- Mostly Catholicism and Calvinism

Related ethnic groups
- Swiss people Swiss Brazilians · Swiss Uruguayans · Swiss Chileans · Other White Argentines

Swiss Argentines are Argentine citizens of Swiss ancestry or people who emigrated from Switzerland and reside in Argentina. The Swiss Argentine community is the largest group of the Swiss diaspora in South America.

Approximately 75,000 Swiss emigrated to Argentina by 1940, settling mainly in the provinces of Córdoba and Santa Fe and, to a lesser extent, in Buenos Aires. In 1856, 200 families of immigrants from Switzerland, Germany, France, Italy, Belgium and Luxembourg founded the city of Esperanza, the forerunner of agricultural colonies in Argentina, thus kickstarting a long process of European colonization and immigration. In Río Negro, Swiss settlement began in the late 19th century in the village of Colonia Suiza ("Swiss Colony").Today there are 400,000 Argentines-Swiss.

Moritz and Theodor Alemann played an important role in encouraging Swiss immigration in the late 19th century by disseminating information to potential settlers.

Theodor's Argentine, Dr. Ernesto Alemann, founded the Colegio Pestalozzi in 1934 with the aim of creating a place for free and humanistic education in accordance with the philosophy of Swiss pedagogue Johann Heinrich Pestalozzi.

Félix Fernando Bernasconi was a Swiss Argentine shoe manufacturer to whom Francisco Moreno sold a property on the southside of Buenos Aires. On this site Moreno had already established a charitable school. After the death of Bernasconi in 1914, additional funding by the Argentine government allowed to build the largest school in Buenos Aires at the time, called the Bernasconi Institute, which opened in 1929.

Also associated with Moreno was Santiago Roth, a Swiss immigrant. Roth became a famous Argentine paleontologist who had joined Moreno on many expeditions to Patagonia and whom Moreno established as Head of the Paleontology Department at the La Plata Museum. In addition, Emilio Frey, son of a Swiss immigrant and educated in Switzerland, became an important partner of Moreno as a topographer of the Comisión de limites Argentina-Chile from 1896 to 1902 working to develop a new treaty for the border between the two countries.

== History ==
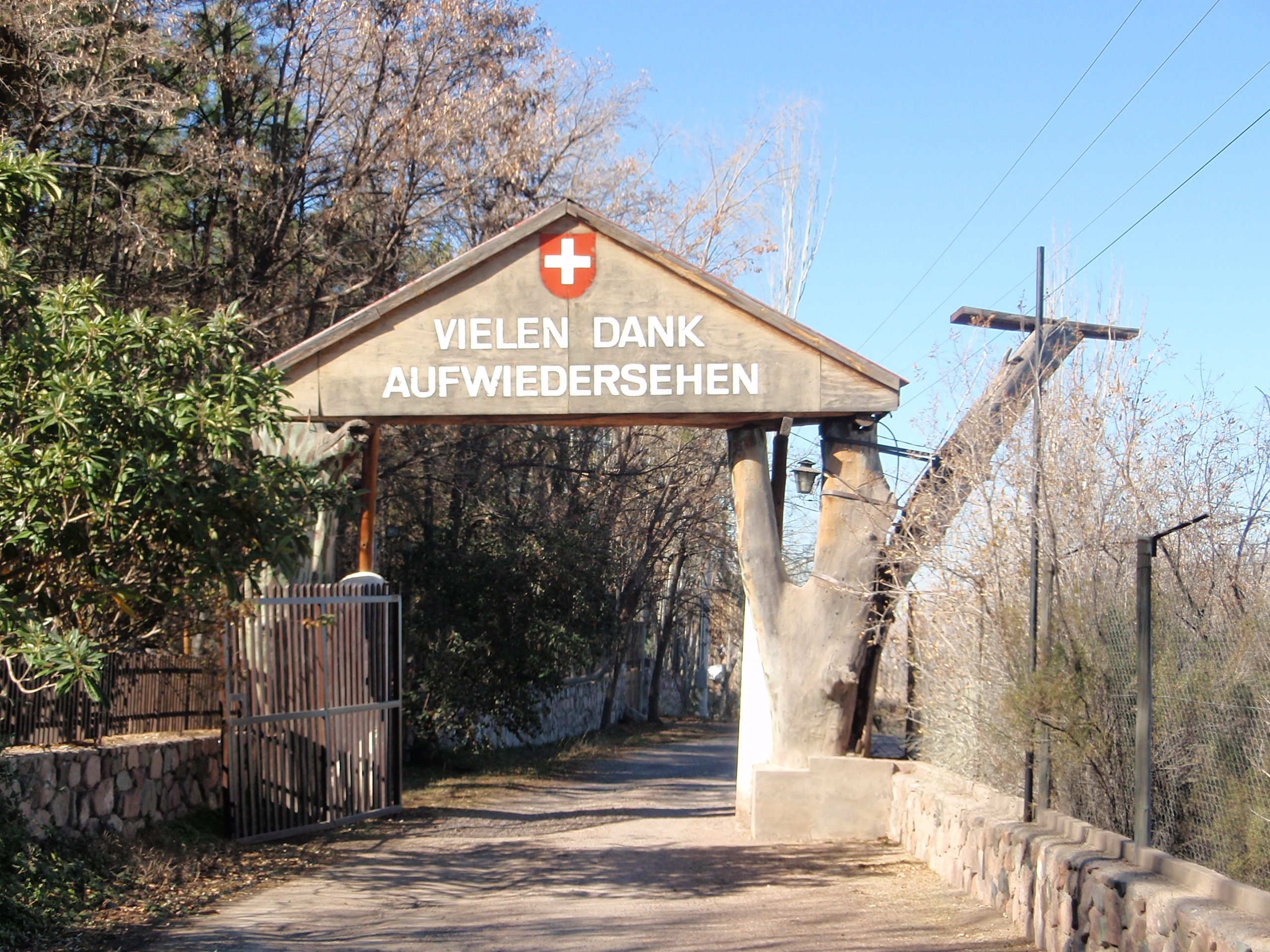
Swiss Colony in Mendoza.

Swiss immigration to Argentina began in February 1856 when the first group with a total of 421 European immigrants arrived in Santa Fe and by June there were already established about 200 farming families, about 1,400 people, whom more than 50% were French and German-speaking Swiss. The first colony founded by these Swiss settlers was called Esperanza, this being the main and largest Swiss colony in Argentina. The grants were awarded by lottery in 1862 and the final installment of property was given to its new occupants.

Also, the province of Entre Ríos received many Swiss immigrants, especially those from French-speaking Switzerland. Many of these Franco-Swiss along with French immigrants contributed to the founding of several colonies in the province. The first agricultural and livestock production colony in Entre Ríos was founded in 1857: San José under the auspices of then-President Justo José de Urquiza. Its inhabitants spoke French, Italian and/or German and some were Catholic while others were Protestant. Democratic coexistence rules were introduced and secret suffrage was performed for the first time in Argentina's history. Another colony was Villa Urquiza, made up of Swiss families that had the province of Corrientes as their original destination but ended up settling in Entre Ríos.

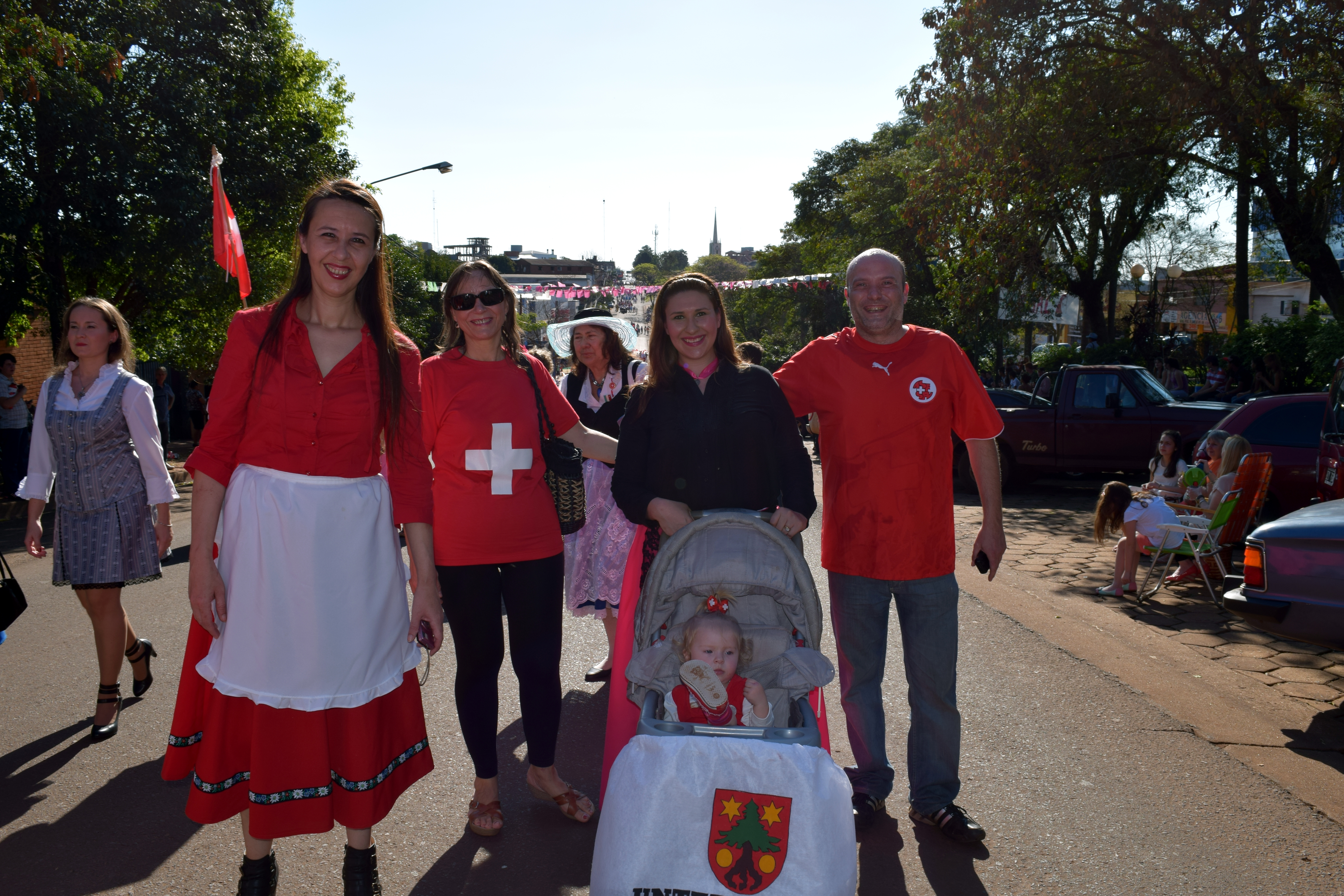
Swiss Argentines at the 2014 Immigrant's Festival in Oberá.

In 1869 the colony of Grutly, Santa Fe was founded, followed by the colonies of Santa María, Colonia Nueva and Rivadavia, by Swiss and Italian immigrants. In Río Negro there is a town called Colonia Suiza where the Swiss settlement was formed in the late nineteenth century. Many Swiss settlers, who had spent more than a decade in Chile, arrived in the city of Bariloche and its surroundings.

One of the major Swiss pioneers was Guillermo Lehmann (born in Winterthur, Canton of Zürich), who founded several villages and towns between 1870 and 1880, with Rafaela, Santa Fe being one of the most important settlements. In 1872, the colony inspector Guillermo Wilcken recorded 16,678 foreign inhabitants distributed in 34 colonies in the provinces of Santa Fe, Entre Ríos and Córdoba. Of this number, 5,957 were Swiss settlers, followed by Italians, "new Argentines" (children of foreign settlers and naturalised foreigners), French and Germans. Meanwhile, a report by the Swiss Consulate of the same date indicates a total of 10,000 Swiss residents in Argentina; about 2,000 living in Buenos Aires.

One of the main factors that favoured the settlement by immigrants in the country was the railroad. The layout of the Central Argentine Railway, from Rosario to Cordoba, encouraged the settlement of colonies along the railroad tracks. Since 1870, the Swiss were chosen to start the large-scale settlement. Thus arose the agricultural settlements of Bernstadt (today Roldán), Carcarañá, Cañada de Gómez, Tortugas, Armstrong and many others.

== See also ==
- Argentina–Switzerland relations
- Argentines of European descent
- Austrian Argentines
- German Argentines
- French Argentines
- Italian Argentines
