= List of international presidential trips made by Javier Milei =

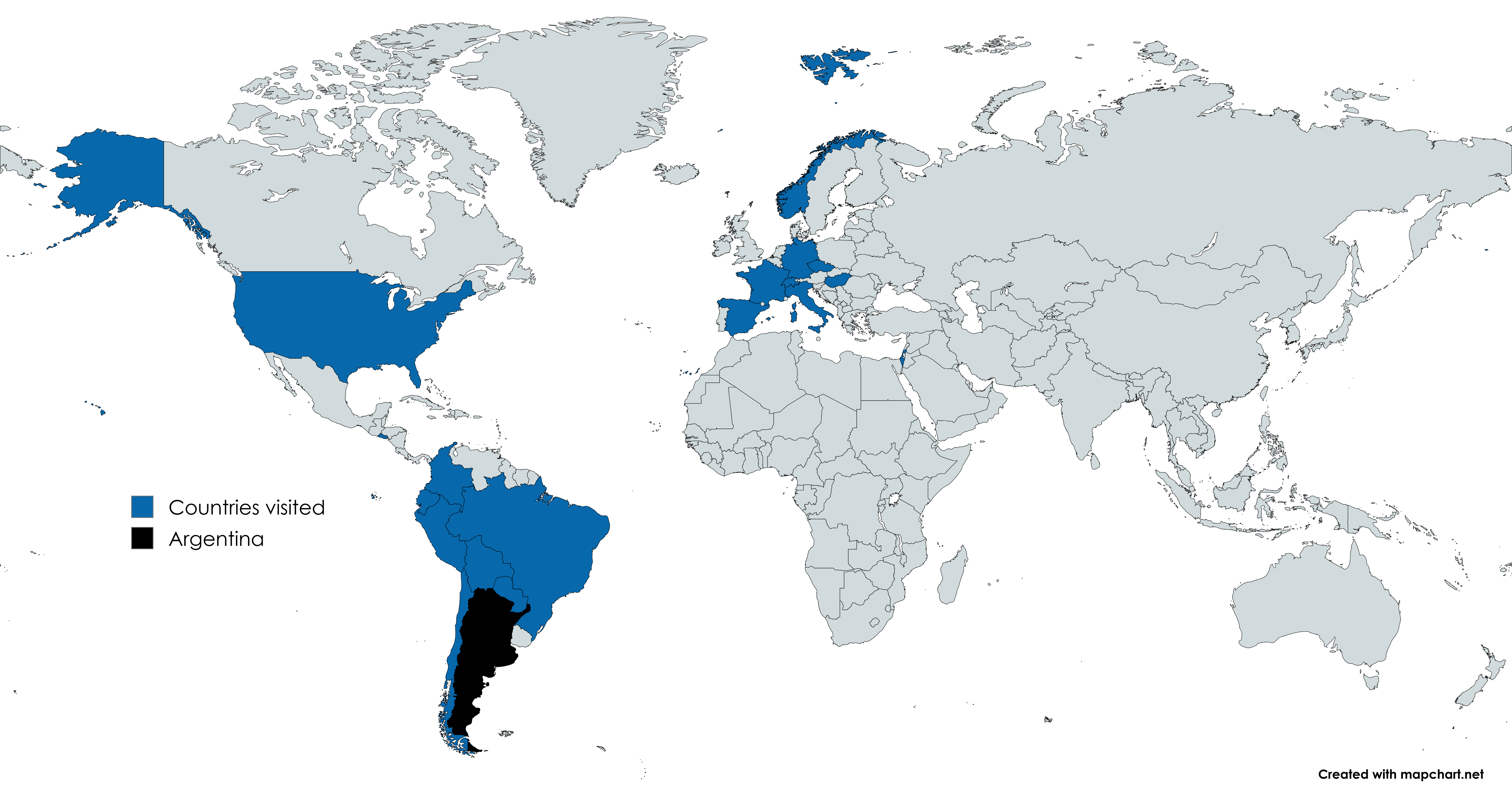
International trips of Javier Milei as a president of Argentina as of August 2026

This is a list of international presidential trips made by Javier Milei, the president of Argentina, since December 2023.

== Summary ==
Number of visits	Country
18	United States
6	Spain
4	Brazil, Italy and Switzerland
3	Chile, France, Israel, and Vatican City
2	Paraguay
1	Bolivia, Colombia, Czech Republic, El Salvador, Ecuador, Germany, Hungary, Peru, and Norway

== 2023 ==
In 2023, Milei made a single trip overseas as president-elect.

Country	Areas visited	Date(s)	Notes	Photograph
United States	New York City	27 November	Further information: Argentina–United States relations Further information: Argentina and the International Monetary Fund While serving as president-elect, Milei made a trip to New York City, citing personal reasons. While on this trip, he first visited and connected with the Hasidic community, notably paying tribute to Rebbe Menachem Mendel Schneerson and meeting Rabbi Simon Jacobson, who has had a great influence on him. Afterward, Milei met with former President Bill Clinton, as well as several officials from the American government and the International Monetary Fund.	

== 2024 ==
Foreign trips made by Javier Milei as president.

Country	Areas visited	Date(s)	Notes	Photograph
Switzerland	Davos	15–19 January	Further information: Argentina–Switzerland relations Milei travelled to the 54th Annual Meeting of the World Economic Forum in Davos, where he delivered a speech critical of certain World Economic Forum policies and ideals while appealing to entrepreneurs to invest in Argentina.	
Israel	Tel Aviv; Jerusalem	6 February	Further information: Argentina–Israel relations Despite having said that his first presidential trip abroad would be to Israel, it became his second official visit as president. During his visit to Israel, he met with President Isaac Herzog and Prime Minister Benjamin Netanyahu, who called Milei a "great friend of the Jewish State". While visiting the area near the conflict with Hamas, Milei met with the families of the victims of the Gaza war hostage crisis. During his trip, Milei also vowed to move the Argentine embassy to Jerusalem.	
Vatican City; Italy	Vatican City; Rome	9 February	Further information: Argentina–Holy See relations Further information: Argentina-Italy relations Milei visited Pope Francis in his first visit to the Vatican as president, where they also commemorated and Francis canonized Argentina's first female saint. After that, Milei met with Italian President Sergio Mattarella, Italian Prime Minister Giorgia Meloni, along with prominent business and religious leaders during his trip.	
United States	Washington, D.C. National Harbor	23 February	After having met with US Secretary of State Antony Blinken at the Casa Rosada, Milei boarded a plane bound for Washington, D.C. and later attended the Conservative Political Action Conference (CPAC) in National Harbor, Maryland, where he delivered a speech and also met with former President Donald Trump.	
United States	Miami; Austin	10–12 April	On 10 April, Milei visited a Chabad Lubavitch synagogue in Miami, which honored him with a distinction. On 12 April, he met with Elon Musk in Austin, Texas, where he toured the Tesla Gigafactory.	
United States	Los Angeles	5–6 May	Milei travelled to the Milken Institute Global Conference in Los Angeles. He gave a speech on 6 May and encouraged business leaders present at the meeting to invest in Argentina. He later met with FIFA President Gianni Infantino and Musk, in his second meeting with the businessman in 2024.	
Spain	Madrid	17–19 May	Further information: Argentina–Spain relations On 17 May, Milei presented his book El camino del libertario in Madrid. On 18 May, he held a meeting with business executives and Santiago Abascal, leader of the Spanish Vox party. On 19 May, he gave a speech at the "Europa Viva 24" political event.	
United States	San Francisco Bay Area	28–30 May	On 28 May, Milei met with Sam Altman, CEO of OpenAI. On 29 May, he met with Condoleezza Rice, director of the Hoover Institution and former Secretary of State, and Richard Saller, president of Stanford University, where he also gave a speech. On the same day he met with Tim Cook, CEO of Apple, and Sundar Pichai, CEO of Alphabet and Google. On 30 May he gave a speech at the Pacific Summit conference and later met with Mark Zuckerberg, CEO of Meta Platforms.	
El Salvador	San Salvador	1 June	Further information: Argentina–El Salvador relations Attended the second inauguration of President Nayib Bukele.	
Italy	Fasano, Apulia	13–15 June	Argentina was one of the countries invited to the 50th G7 summit hosted by Italy at the Borgo Egnazia resort in Apulia. There, Milei met with heads of state of the G7 such as French President Emmanuel Macron and U.S. President Joe Biden, as well as other invited leaders. He also met with Pope Francis.	
Switzerland	Bürgenstock; Lucerne	15–16 June	After his presidential trip to Italy, Milei attended the Ukraine peace summit in Switzerland.	
Spain	Madrid	21 June	Milei made a private, non-official visit to Madrid. There, he received the International Medal of the Community of Madrid and the Medal of the Juan de Mariana Institute. He also met with political opponents to Spanish prime minister Pedro Sánchez, whom he and his wife, Begoña Gómez, had accused of corruption, which soured diplomatic tensions between the two countries.	
Germany	Hamburg; Berlin	22–23 June	Further information: Argentina–Germany relations The day after meeting Spanish opposition politicians, Milei travelled to Germany, where he received the Hayek Medal and held a working meeting with Chancellor Olaf Scholz. Negotiations over a trade agreement between the European Union and Mercosur were discussed. The German government had also organised a greeting with military honors and a joint press conference between Milei and Scholz, but this was later canceled.	
Czech Republic	Prague	24 June	Milei visited the Czech Republic and met with businessmen and Prime Minister Petr Fiala. He also met with Czech President Petr Pavel and spoke at the Liberal Institute, a libertarian think tank.	
Brazil	Balneário Camboriú	6–7 July	Further information: Argentina–Brazil relations Milei travelled to Balneário Camboriú as an invitee to CPAC Brazil, where he met with former President Jair Bolsonaro.	
United States	Sun Valley	12–14 July	Milei travelled to Sun Valley, Idaho as an invitee to the Allen & Company meeting with business and technology executives.	
France	Paris	25–27 July	Attended the opening ceremony of the 2024 Summer Olympics. He also held a meeting with President Emmanuel Macron.	
Paraguay	Asunción	27 July	Held a meeting with Argentine ambassador to Paraguay Guillermo Nielsen.	
Chile	Santiago	8 August	Attended a commemorative event for the anniversary of the GasAndes company.	
United States	New York City	22–25 September	On 23 September, Milei rang the opening bell of the New York Stock Exchange and also met with Musk. On 24 September, he gave a speech at the General debate of the 79th session of the United Nations General Assembly.	
United States	Palm Beach; Mar-a-Lago	14–15 November	Visited Trump at Mar-a-Lago and spoke at the Conservative Political Action Conference.	
Brazil	Rio de Janeiro	18–19 November	Attended the 2024 G20 Rio de Janeiro summit. He also held bilateral meetings with Chinese president Xi Jinping, Indian prime minister Narendra Modi, and IMF head Kristalina Georgieva.	

== 2025 ==
Country	Areas visited	Date(s)	Notes	Photograph
United States	Washington, D.C.	19–20 January	Attended the second inauguration of Donald Trump.	
Switzerland	Davos	21–23 January	Attended the 55th Annual Meeting of the World Economic Forum.	
United States	Washington, D.C.	19–22 February	Attended the Conservative Political Action Conference (CPAC).	
United States	Palm Beach	2–3 April	Attended an event at Mar-a-Lago, where he was supposed to meet U.S. president Donald Trump, but the meeting did not take place.	
Paraguay	Asunción	9 April	Met with Paraguayan President Santiago Peña.	
Italy; Vatican City	Rome; Vatican City	25–26 April	Attended the funeral of Pope Francis together with several ministers and secretaries, and held a private meeting with Italian prime minister Giorgia Meloni.	
Italy	Rome	6 June	Met with Prime Minister Giorgia Meloni and signed a strategic agreement between YPF and ENI for Argentina to export LNG, while also ratifying the "Italy–Argentina Plan 2025–2030".	
Vatican City	Vatican City	7 June	Met with Pope Leo XIV in his first audience with the new pope.	
Spain	Madrid	7–8 June	Met with Santiago Abascal, leader of Vox, Venezuelan opposition leader Edmundo González, football manager Diego Simeone, and with President of the Community of Madrid Isabel Díaz Ayuso. He also gave a speech at the Madrid Economic Forum.	
France	Nice	9 June	Met with French President Emmanuel Macron on the sidelines of the United Nations Ocean Conference, in which both participated.	
Israel	Tel Aviv; Jerusalem	9–11 June	Met with President Isaac Herzog and Prime Minister Benjamin Netanyahu. Milei also visited the Western Wall, met relatives of Argentines kidnapped by Hamas in Gaza, received the Genesis Prize and signed with Netanyahu a "Memorandum in favor of Democracy and Freedom". During this visit he announced that the Argentine embassy in Israel would be relocated to Jerusalem.	
United States	Los Angeles	4–5 September	Travelled with Luis Caputo and Gerardo Werthein to meet astronaut Noel del Castro, economist Michael Milken, Mark A. Nelson of Chevron Corporation, Andy Kleinman, and a group of businessmen.	
Spain	Madrid	13–14 September	Attended the Patriots for Europe event "Europa VIVA 25".	
United States	New York City	22–25 September	Gave a speech at the general debate of the eightieth session of the United Nations General Assembly. On the sidelines of the assembly, he met with U.S. President Donald Trump, Israeli Prime Minister Benjamin Netanyahu, and IMF Managing Director Kristalina Georgieva. He also attended the Atlantic Council Global Citizen Awards gala, where he received the Global Citizen Award from U.S. Treasury Secretary Scott Bessent.	
United States	Washington, D.C.	14 October	Met with U.S. President Donald Trump at the White House.	
United States	Miami	5–8 November	Participated in the "America Business Forum".	
Bolivia	La Paz	8 November	Attended the inauguration ceremony of President Rodrigo Paz Pereira.	
Norway	Oslo	5 December	Travelled to Oslo for the Nobel Peace Prize gala; planned interviews with King Harald V and Prime Minister Jonas Gahr Støre ultimately did not take place.	
Brazil	Foz do Iguaçu	21 December	Attended the Mercosur summit.	

== 2026 ==
Country	Areas visited	Date(s)	Notes	Photograph
Switzerland	Davos	21 January	Further information: Argentina–Switzerland relations Attended the 2026 World Economic Forum summit in Davos.	
United States	Washington, D.C.	19 February	Attended the inaugural meeting of the Board of Peace.	
United States	Miami; Doral; New York City	6–10 March	Participated in the "Shield of the Americas" summit in Miami and the Hispanic Prosperity Gala in Doral. In New York, he visited the tomb of the Lubavitcher Rebbe, delivered a speech at Yeshiva University, and attended the opening of Argentina Week 2026.	
Chile	Valparaíso	11 March	Attended the inauguration ceremony of José Antonio Kast.	
Spain	Madrid	12–21 March	Participated in the Madrid Economic Forum and met with Santiago Abascal.	
Hungary	Budapest	20–22 March	Attended CPAC Hungary and met with Prime Minister Viktor Orbán.	
Israel	Jerusalem, Ramat Gan, and Tel Aviv.	19 April – 22 April	Main article: 2026 state visit by Javier Milei to Israel	
United States	Los Angeles	6 May	Attended a conference of the Milken Institute in Beverly Hills. Along with Milei, Foreign Minister Quirno and Ambassador to the US Alec Oxenford participated in the events.	
Spain	Madrid	25–27 June	From 25 to 27 of June 2026, President Javier Milei made his sixth visit to Spain since taking office. Accompanied by the Minister of Human Capital, Sandra Pettovello, and joined by Foreign Minister Pablo Quirno, the trip focused on promoting foreign investment in Argentina. Milei met with executives from major Spanish and European corporations, including Banco Santander, BBVA, Telefónica, Mapfre, Iberia, Indra and Dia. During the visit, he also delivered a lecture at the CEU San Pablo University for the opening of their summer courses. Consistent with his previous trips to the country, Milei did not hold any official meetings with King Felipe VI or Prime Minister Pedro Sánchez, maintaining the ongoing political and diplomatic distance between the two administrations.	
Brazil	São Paulo	25 July	Visited presidential candidate Flávio Bolsonaro and endorsed his candidacy for president of Brazil, strongly criticizing President Luiz Inácio Lula da Silva and socialism. Milei was bestowed with the Order of Ipiranga by the Governor of São Paulo Tarcísio de Freitas.	
Peru	Lima	28 July	Attended the inauguration ceremony of Keiko Fujimori.	
Ecuador	Quito	6 August	Official state visit. President Milei met with Ecuadorian President Daniel Noboa at the Carondelet Palace. Both leaders signed seven bilateral agreements, including an updated extradition treaty, agreements on cyberdefense, air services, automotive trade, and the peaceful use of nuclear energy.	
Colombia	Cali	7 August	Attendance at the presidential inauguration of Abelardo de la Espriella. President Milei arrived at the Alfonso Bonilla Aragón International Airport on 6 August and attended the official investiture ceremony held at the Santiago de Cali University on 7 August. During the visit, Milei held a bilateral meeting with the newly inaugurated Colombian president to discuss regional cooperation and economic relations.	
Chile	Santiago	3 September 2026	Attended a political conference and met with Chilean president José Antonio Kast and, in a separate meeting, with Sarah B. Rogers, the United States Under Secretary of State for Public Diplomacy and Public Affairs. Milei spoke with Rogers about geopolitical issues and the Falkland Islands sovereignty dispute after President Trump referenced a potential shift in the US position about the issue.	
United States	New York City	22–23 September	Milei participated at the general debate of the eighty-first session of the United Nations General Assembly in New York City. He also plans to meet with President Donald Trump and seek further support from the US regarding Argentina's claim on the Falkland Islands after suspending his trip to the UK amid tensions with the British government over the issue.	
France	Paris	30 September–2 October	Milei attended the Argentina Week Paris and take part in a meeting with European investors. He is also expected to meet French President Emmanuel Macron and receive a recognition from the Paris Economic Forum, distinguishing him and French economist Philippe Aghion as the two "most influential economists in the world."	

== Scheduled trips ==
Country	Areas visited	Date(s)	Notes
United States	Washington, D.C.	13–14 October	Milei will attend a Hispanic Heritage event in Washington, and it is expected that he will express his support for President Trump and the GOP ahead of the November midterm elections.
Poland	Warsaw	TBD	Milei received an invitation from the Polish government to visit the country during his trip to Europe in 2026. Officials from the government stated that it could take place and include a stopover in Ukraine.
Ukraine	Kyiv	TBD	Milei had scheduled a trip to Ukraine for February 2026 but postponed it due to security issues regarding the Iran war. The government stated that Milei plans to include Ukraine in his trip to Europe in 2026, where he is expected to meet with President Volodymyr Zelenskyy.

== Suspended trips ==
Country	Scheduled date	Suspension date	Notes
United Kingdom	October 2026	10 September 2026	In December 2025, media in Argentina and in the UK confirmed that Milei planned to visit the UK in the first visit by an Argentine leader to Britain in 27 years. Outlets like El País and Infobae said that Milei intends to negotiate the sale of arms and the lifting of the British restrictions placed in the aftermath of the Falklands War. In April 2026, officials linked to the Foreign Ministry led by Pablo Quirno confirmed that Milei wants to visit the UK after his trip to Israel. Aside from meeting with PM Keir Starmer, the statement said that Milei wishes to meet with Nigel Farage, the Leader of Reform UK. In July 2026, it was reported that Milei planned to visit the UK in October during events related to a conference seeking foreign investment named "Argentina Week" in London. He was expected to meet with Prime Minister Andy Burnham and express the Argentine government's wish to negotiate the lifting of an embargo on arms sales from the UK after the Falklands War. On 10 September 2026, Casa Rosada officials confirmed to media that President Milei had suspended his trip to the UK following tensions between Argentina and the United Kingdom over the Falkland Islands sovereignty dispute. In the weeks preceding the decision to suspend the state visit, Milei toughened his position on the issue of the sovereignty of the islands, with media speculating that he was motivated by remarks by US president Donald Trump suggesting that he was willing to review the American position regarding the Falklands amid deteriorating relations between his administration and the British government.

== Multilateral meetings ==
Multilateral meetings of the following intergovernmental organizations took place during Javier Milei's presidency (2023–present).

Group	Year			
Group	2024	2025	2026	2027
UNGA	24–27 September, (United States) New York City	23–26 September, (United States) New York City	22–25 September, (United States) New York City	TBD, (United States) New York City
G20	18–19 November, (Brazil) Rio de Janeiro	22–23 November^{[a]}, (South Africa) Johannesburg	14–15 December, (United States) Miami	TBD, United Kingdom
SOA (OAS)	none		TBD, (Dominican Republic) Punta Cana	TBA
Others	G7; 13–14 June, (Italy) Fasano	None	TBA	TBA
██ = Did not attend.^aMinister of Foreign Affairs, International Trade and Worship Pablo Quirno attended in the president's place. ██ = Future event.
