= Austrian Argentines =

Languages
- Rioplatense Spanish; Austrian German

Religion
- Christianity; Judaism

Related ethnic groups
- German Argentines; Swiss Argentines; Luxembourgian Argentines

Austrian Argentines are Argentine citizens of Austrian descent or Austrian-born people who emigrated to Argentina. Many Austrian descendants in Argentina arrived in the country from other parts of Europe when Austria was a unified kingdom with Hungary.

Austrian immigration has been linked to other migratory flows towards the South American country as the German and Swiss immigration waves, among others.

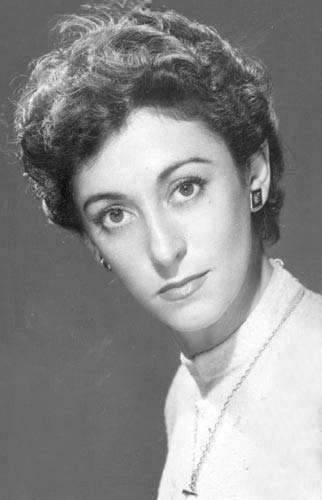
Hilda Bernard

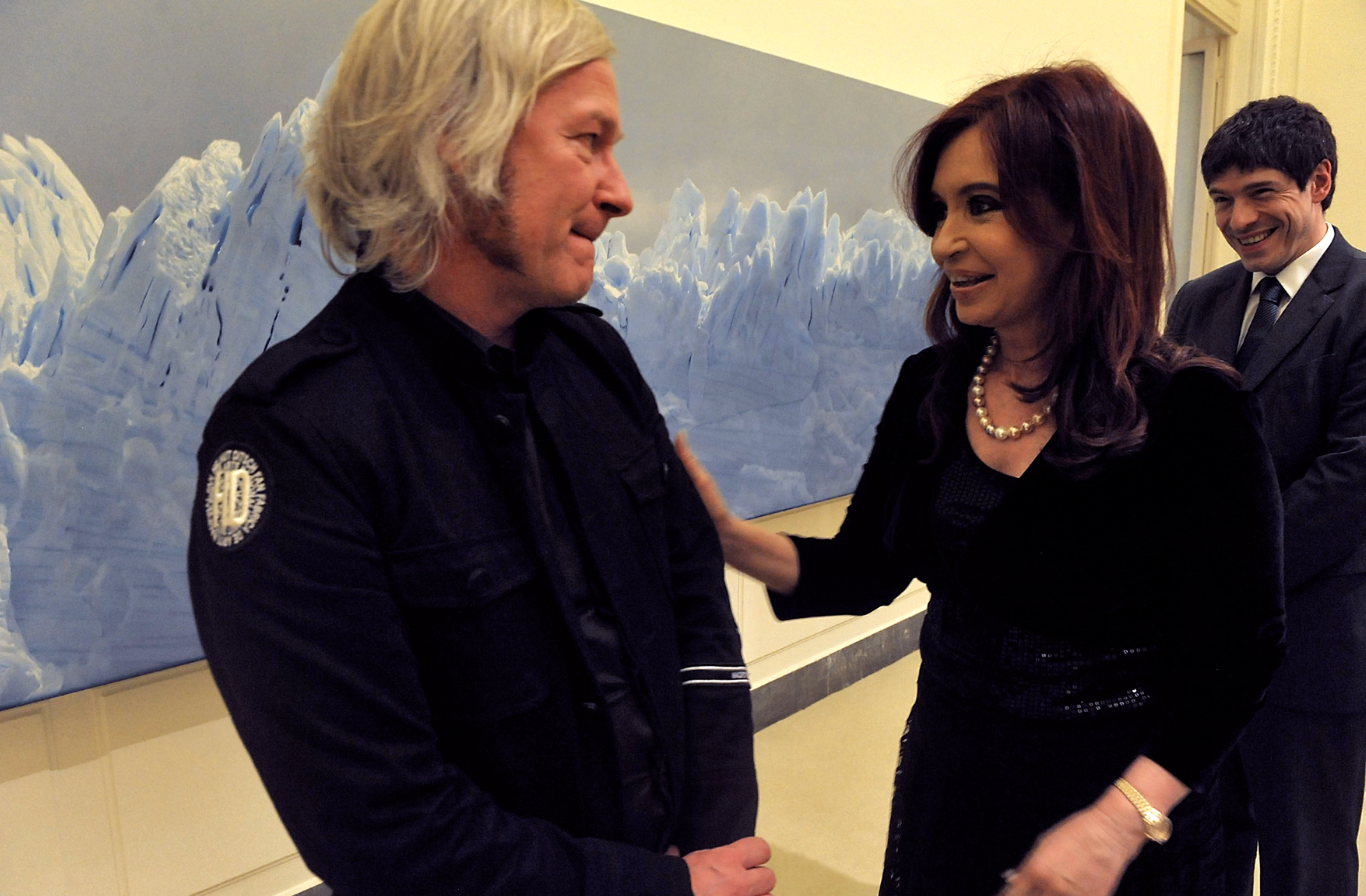
Helmut Ditsch

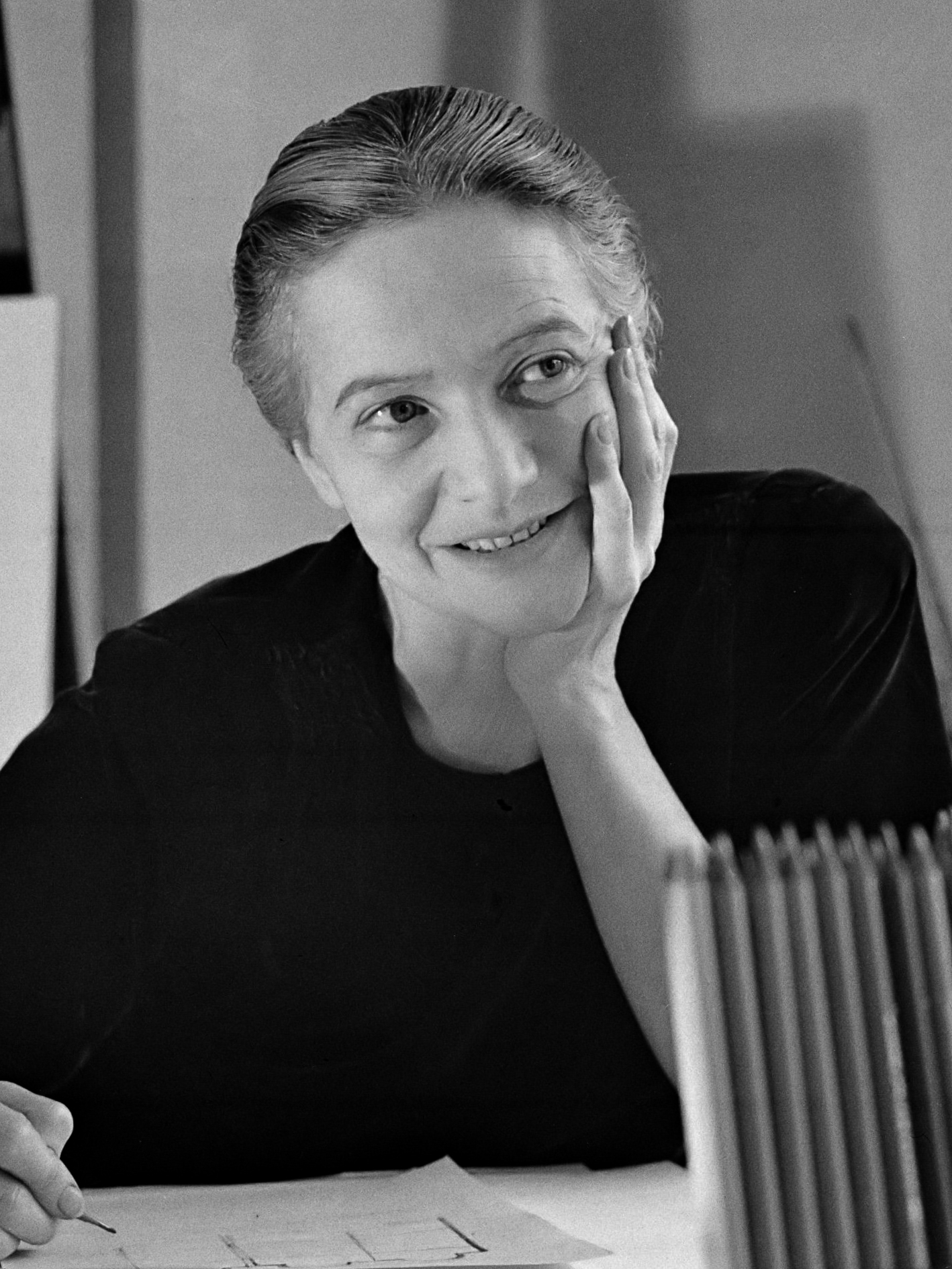
Mariette Lydis

== History ==
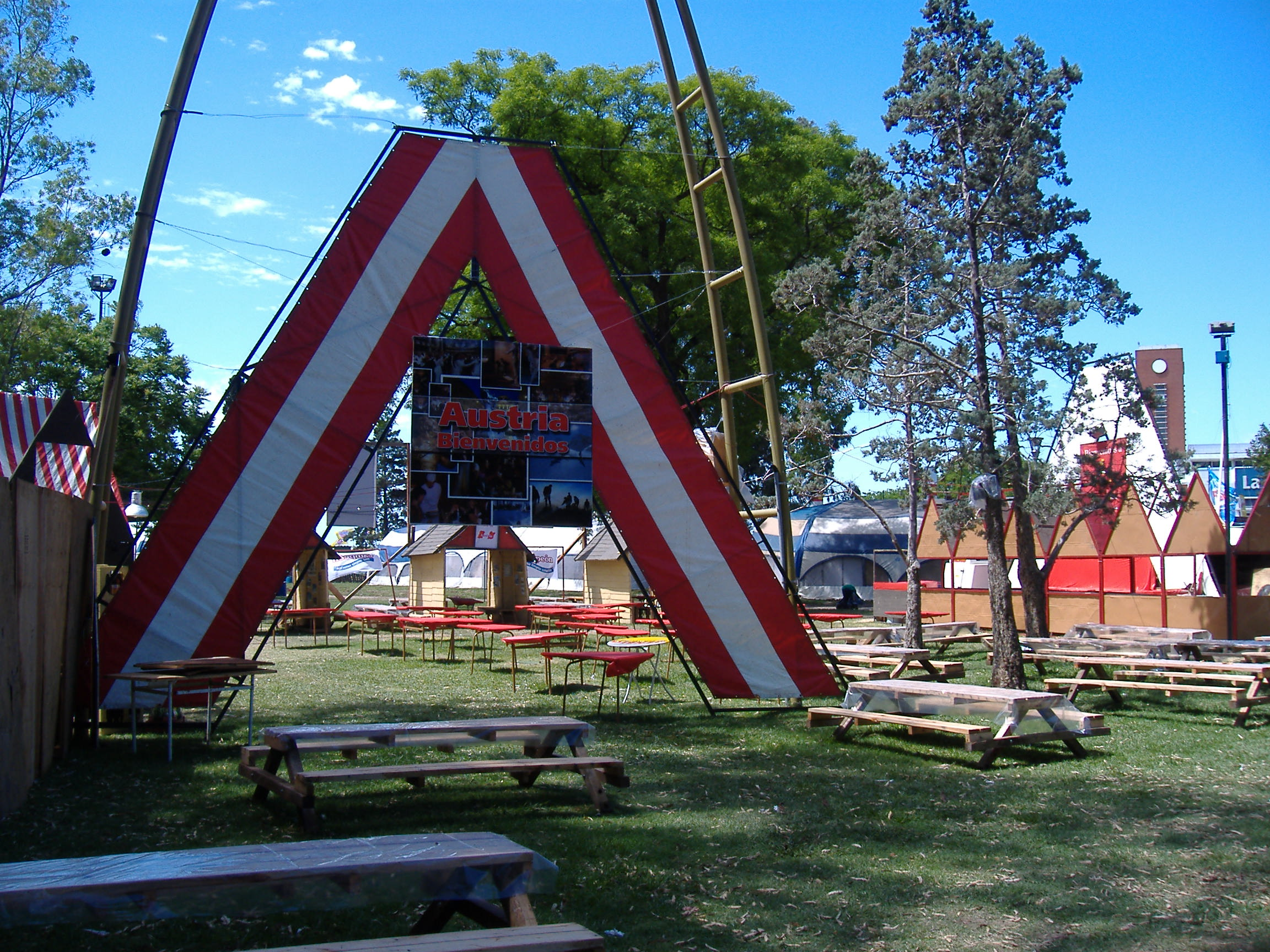
Austrian Argentine community of Rosario, Santa Fe during the National Festival of Communities in 2006.

Austrian immigrants who came to Argentina did during the two great migratory waves, i.e., about the First and Second World War. The main settlement sites were Buenos Aires, Córdoba and Misiones; in the south, cities like San Carlos de Bariloche and San Martín de los Andes were among the main destinations for Austrians. The amount has never exactly been relieved and there are mostly estimates. In the early thirties, there were approximately 240,000 German-speaking people of whom 45,000 resided in Buenos Aires, and since about 9,000 were of Austrian descent. These figures are similar to those recorded in the Austrian Embassy, approximately 7,000 people of Austrian descent in Buenos Aires, considering the probability of being greater. Since the mid-nineteenth century there had been established a German-speaking colony in the neighbourhood of Belgrano, Buenos Aires. The Austrian and Swiss residents in Buenos Aires were integrated into this colony by the language and cultural affinity in general. This neighbourhood was very attractive to new immigrants since it already had adequate infrastructure, as churches, cafes and bakeries in German families that had arisen due to the former colony. Argentina is, ethnographically, the second Latin American country with the largest number of immigrants and descendants of Austrian immigrants after Brazil (being ahead of Uruguay in third) with Córdoba as the seat of the main Austrian community of Argentina, which is the province with the largest immigrant population of German and Austrian descent in the country.

== Organisations ==
Among the Austrian institutions in the country are: the Austrian-Argentine Association (member of the European Club), the San Isidro Austria Club, the Austrian Benevolent Society, the Austrian-Argentine Chamber of Commerce, the House of Austria in Rosario and the Austrian-Argentine Association of Bariloche.

== Austrian settlements in Argentina ==
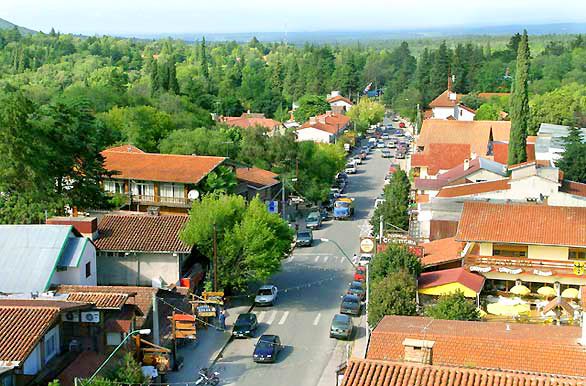
Villa General Belgrano in Córdoba was a destination for Austrian immigrants along with Germans, Swiss and Italians.

Some of the settlement areas along the last century were:

=== Chaco ===
- Resistencia
- Quitilipi

=== Córdoba ===
- Villa General Belgrano
- Colonia Tirolesa

=== Entre Ríos ===
- San Benito

=== Formosa ===
- Colonia Formosa

=== Misiones ===
- Eldorado

=== Río Negro ===
- Villa Regina

=== Santa Fe ===
- Avellaneda

== See also ==
- Argentina–Austria relations
- Argentines of European descent
- German Argentine
- Italian Argentines
- Swiss Argentines
