= Argentina–Switzerland relations =

Bilateral relations

- Argentina: Switzerland

Foreign relations between Argentina and Switzerland date to the 19th century. Switzerland opened a consulate in Buenos Aires in 1834, raised it to a consulate general in 1876, and in 1891 opened its first diplomatic mission in South America there. Argentina is home to the largest Swiss community in Latin America. Trade, Swiss investment in Argentina and cooperation on tax matters are central to the modern relationship. Argentina has an embassy in Bern, and Switzerland has an embassy in Buenos Aires.

== History ==
=== Swiss emigration ===
Swiss nationals began emigrating to the territory of the future Argentine Republic as early as the mid-17th century, and Swiss immigrants founded several settlements in the country. Among them were Esperanza in Santa Fe Province and San Jerónimo Norte, founded in 1859 by five families from the Upper Valais, whose descendants still speak a form of Walliser German. Tens of thousands of Argentines have Swiss roots, and 15,120 Swiss nationals were officially registered in the country at the end of 2023.

=== Second World War ===
During the period of Nazi rule in Germany, the small Swiss-Argentine community was reported to strongly oppose the Nazis' penetration of Argentina. After the defeat of Germany in World War II, Argentine officials posted in Switzerland and Sweden recruited "useful Germans", those with technical expertise sought by Argentina, for migration to the country.

== Diplomatic relations and agreements ==
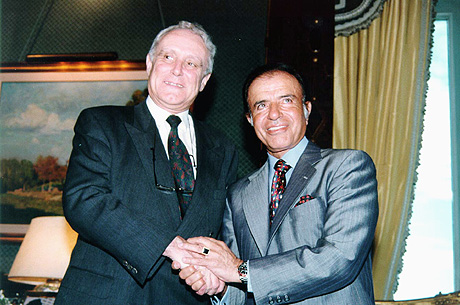
Argentine President Carlos Menem (right) with Swiss Foreign Minister Flavio Cotti in Buenos Aires, 1997

Argentina and Switzerland have concluded a number of bilateral agreements, among them an extradition convention (1887), an agreement on the promotion and reciprocal protection of investments, signed in 1991 and in force from 1992, and a convention for the avoidance of double taxation (1997). Regular political consultations have taken place since 2005, and since July 2012 a regional consular centre in Buenos Aires has handled consular services for Argentina, Paraguay and Uruguay.

== Economic relations ==
Argentina is Switzerland's fourth-largest trading partner in Latin America. In 2023, Switzerland imported CHF 1.1 billion in goods from Argentina, chiefly precious metals and agricultural products, and exported CHF 684 million, mainly chemicals, pharmaceuticals, machinery, precision instruments and watches. At the end of 2022, Swiss direct investment in Argentina stood at CHF 3.5 billion, and Swiss companies employed 11,201 people in the country. Argentina is a member of Mercosur; negotiations on a free trade agreement between the European Free Trade Association and Mercosur were substantially concluded in August 2019.

== Resident diplomatic missions ==
- Argentina has an embassy in Bern.
- Switzerland has an embassy in Buenos Aires.
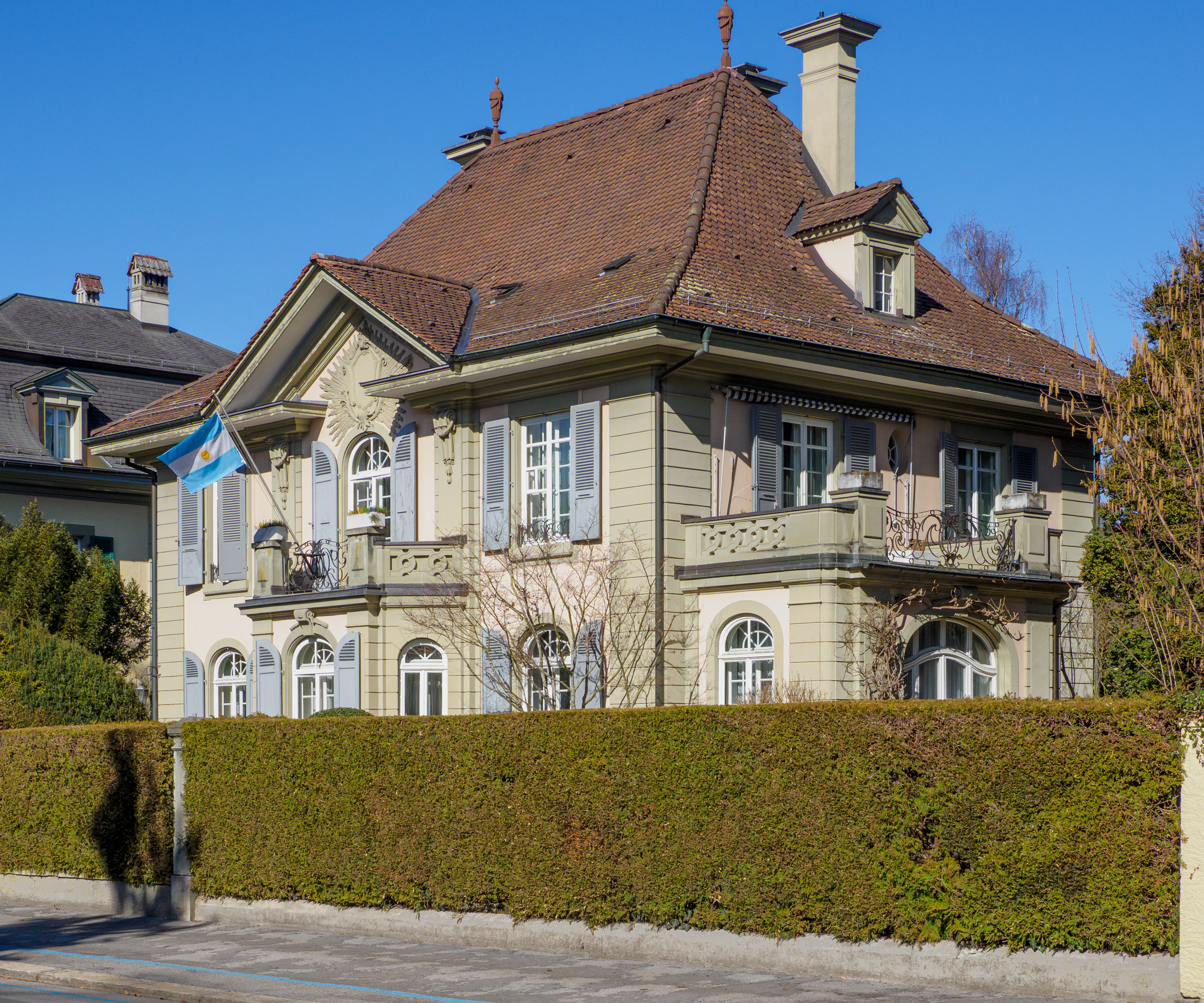
Residence of the Embassy of Argentina in Bern

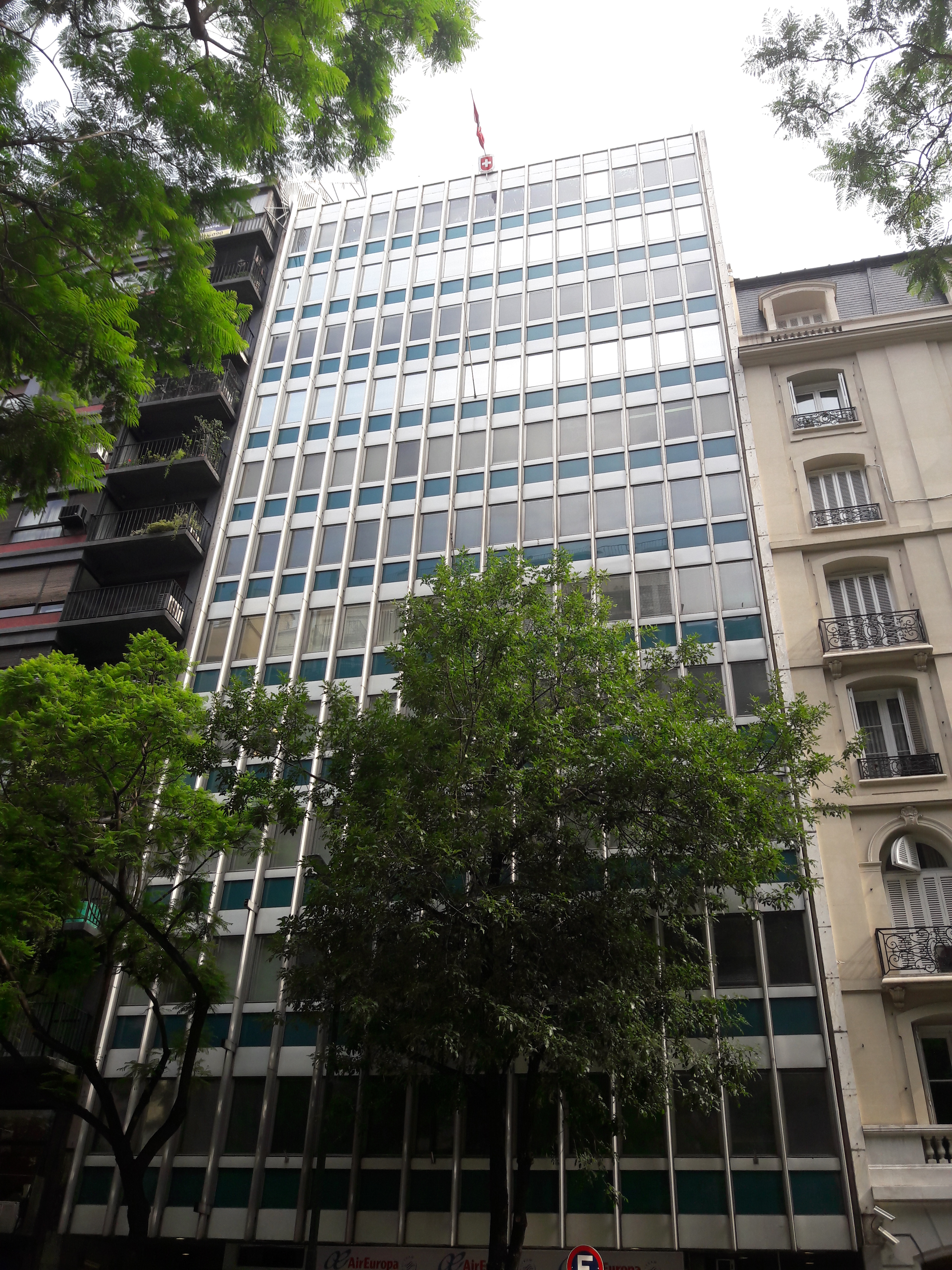
Embassy of Switzerland in Buenos Aires

== See also ==
- Foreign relations of Argentina
- Foreign relations of Switzerland
- Swiss Argentines
- Argentinien-schwyzertütsch dialect
