= Argentinien-schwyzertütsch dialect =

Swiss German dialect spoken in Argentina

Argentinien-schwyzertütsch
- Argentinien-schwyzertütsch
- Native to: Argentina
- Ethnicity: Swiss Argentines
- Language family: Indo-European: Germanic; West Germanic; Elbe Germanic; High German; Upper German; Alemannic; Swiss German; Argentinien-schwyzertütsch

Language codes
- ISO 639-3: –
- Linguasphere: 52-ACB-ho
- IETF: gsw-AR

Argentinien-schwyzertütsch (Spanish: alemán suizo de Argentina) is a dialect of Swiss German spoken in Argentina by descendants of 19th-century immigrants from Switzerland. It is best documented in the Santa Fe colony of San Jerónimo Norte, where the variety is a form of Walliserdeutsch (Valais German). Under sustained contact with Spanish, the majority language, the dialect has declined and become endangered, increasingly not passed on to younger generations.

== History ==
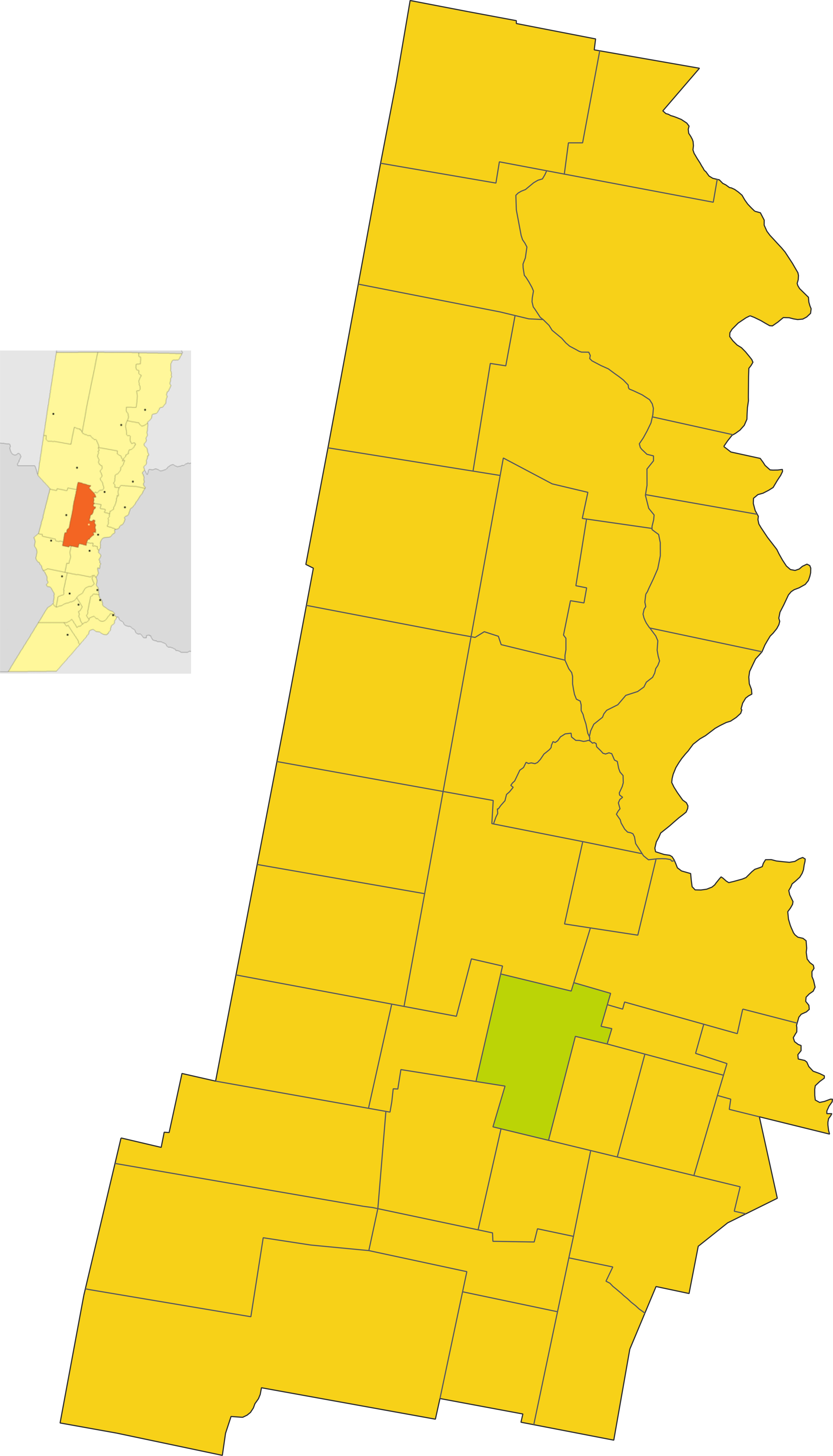
Location of the San Jerónimo Norte commune within Las Colonias Department, Santa Fe Province, the core community of the dialect

During the 19th century, economic hardship drove emigration from Switzerland, including the canton of Valais, to Argentina, where colonists settled in the province of Santa Fe. The village of San Jerónimo Norte was founded in 1859 by five families from the Upper Valais (Oberwallis), which, alongside Esperanza, made it one of the oldest German-speaking settlements in Argentina.

By about 1870 the colony had grown to 236 families and 1,210 people, 180 of the families coming from the Upper Valais. The community, today home to around 7,000 inhabitants, includes about 140 extended families bearing Valais surnames.

== Status and features ==
The variety spoken at San Jerónimo Norte is a form of Walliserdeutsch (Valais German) rather than a generic Swiss German. In the institutional domains of church, school, politics and the media, Spanish, the majority language, is used, while the dialect mainly serves informal contact among people of Swiss descent. The dialect shows grammatical and lexical interference from Spanish, and code-switching has become more frequent as competence in it has declined.

By the early 21st century the dialect was associated mainly with the older generation and was increasingly not passed on to children. Hess-Lüttich concludes that the Valais dialect will die out in these enclaves, its language death demographically foreseeable.

The Linguasphere Register assigns the variety the code 52-ACB-ho. It has no separate ISO 639 code and is classified under Swiss German (gsw).

== See also ==
- Swiss Argentines
- Colonia Tovar dialect
