= Mariette Lydis =

Austrian-born Argentine painter (1887–1970)

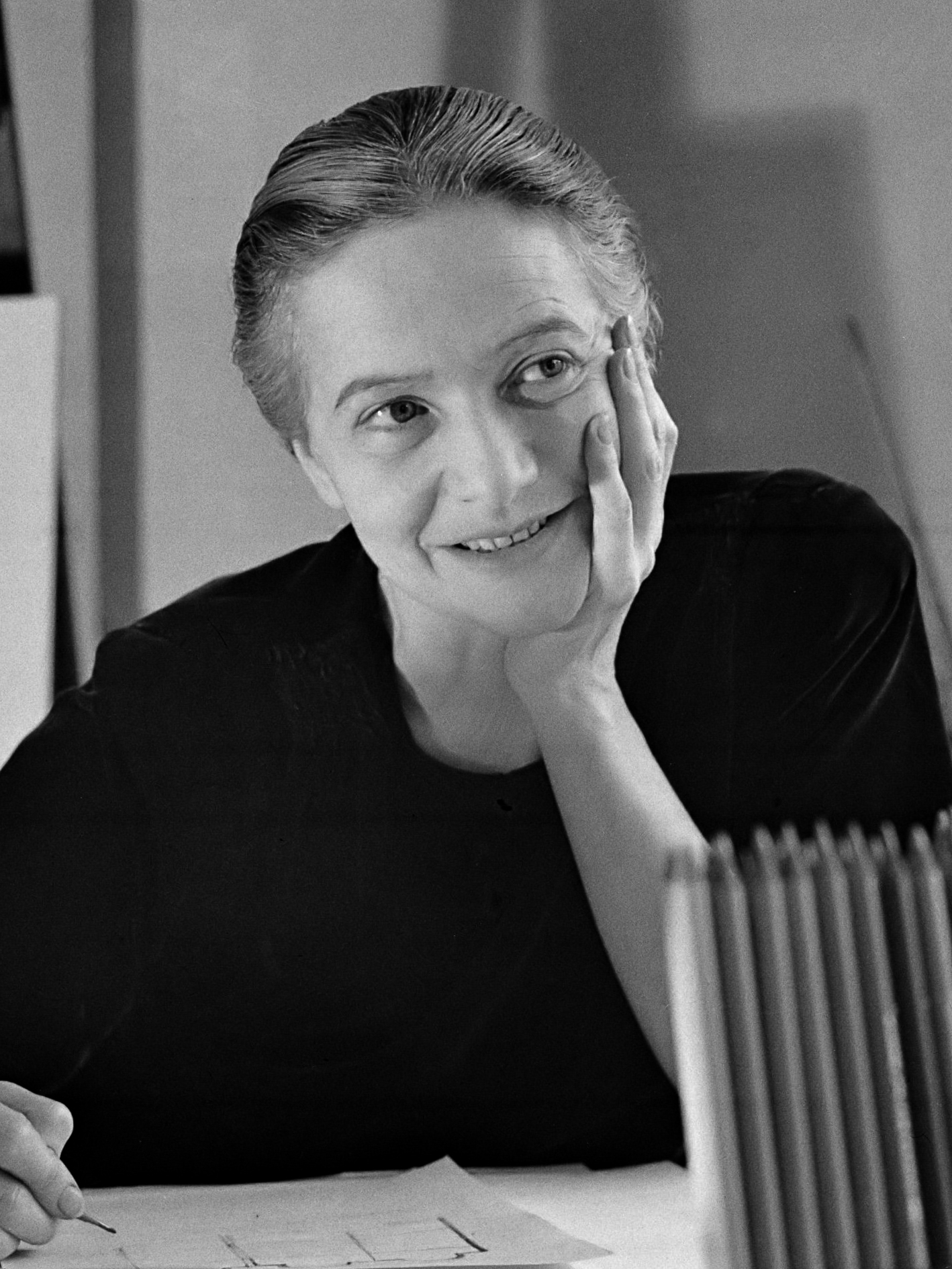
- Mariette Lydis (1936)
- Born: August 24, 1887; Vienna, Austria-Hungary
- Died: April 26, 1970 (aged 82); Buenos Aires, Argentina

Mariette Lydis (1887–1970) was an Austrian-Argentine painter. From 1940 until her death in 1970 she lived in Argentina, with her partner Erica Marx. Lydis lived openly as bisexual. She is best known for her book illustrations and paintings.

== Biography ==
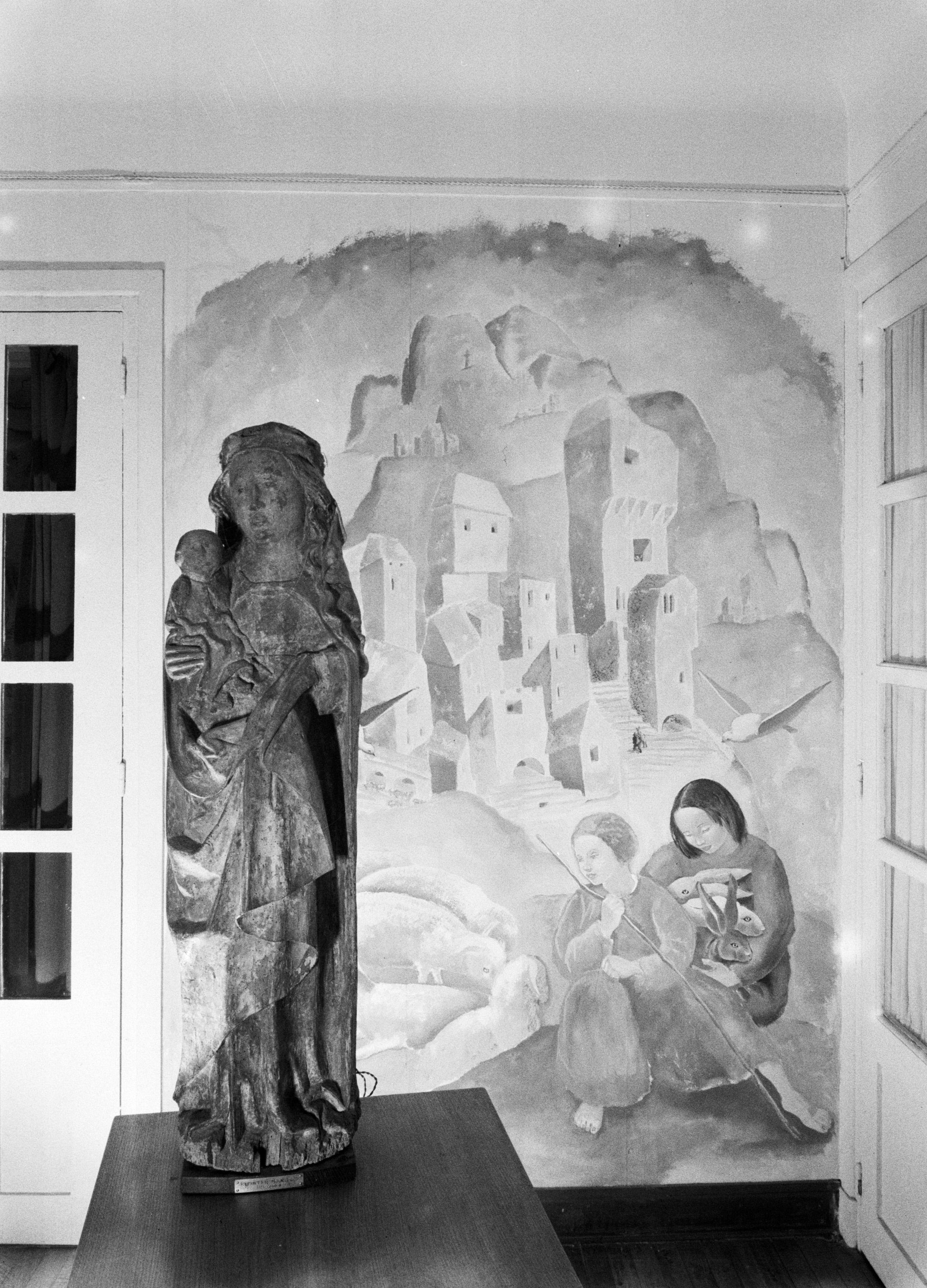
House of Mariette Lydis (1936)

=== Early life ===
Mariette Lydis (born Marietta Ronsperger) was born in Baden, Vienna, Austria on August 24, 1887. She was the daughter of Franz Ronsperger and Eugenia Fischer and had two siblings: Richard and Edith Ronsperger (creator of Opera books). According to her coworker and friend, Béla Balázs, Lydis did not like to discuss her personal family life, although it can be verified that the Ronsperger family was wealthy and that Lydis had a close relationship to her mother, Eugenia. Edith committed suicide in Florence in 1921 and her death had a profound effect on Lydis's life and art.

=== Career ===
Mariette Lydis started her art career as a young self-taught artist who got her start in the art world after traveling to France with Bontempelli in 1925, where she entered the art circles of Paris. Soon she developed a reputation as a talented painter and illustrator. Her first recorded illustration was that of The Cloak of Dreams by Béla Balázs. Additionally, Lydis illustrated Le Petit Jésus by Joseph Delteil. Later “she became a member of the Salon d’Autonne and held a solo exhibit at the Galerie Bernheim” and continued to illustrate books by many authors including Henry de Montherlant, Paul Valéry, Pierre Louÿs, Paul Verlaine, and Jules Supervielle. These works cemented her as an up-and-coming avant-garde artist and gave her name recognition for her future works. During World War II, Mariette Lydis fled Paris and, unable to exhibit her work, had a gap period where she prepared an exhibit intended to be held in Buenos Aires. She ended up staying in Buenos Aires for the majority of the 1940s, working with her then-husband Giuseppe Govone to publish some of her works, including Le Trefle a Quatre Feuilles: Ou La Clef Du Bonheur. In 1948 Mariette returned to France and worked under many French publishers and illustrated works for Guy de Maupassant, Colette, Baudelaire, Rimbaud, Bella Moerel and Henry James. Lydis eventually returned to Buenos Aires due to the political tension of The Cold War and continued to publish art there until her death on April 26, 1970. During her career she had two prominent artistic phases, her first being a darker, sadder period during which she concentrated on portraying poor people, the old men, the dispossessed, the criminals, and the sick. Later on in her life, her work became brighter and she began drawing and painting more women, adolescents, and young children. Throughout her career she was influenced by the Japanese artist Tsuguharu Fourjita.

Along with her illustrations, Lydis was known for her lithographic depictions celebrating lesbian and bisexual relationships. She illustrated women in the active-passive heterosexual relationship stereotype by portraying one woman with slightly masculine-looking features. Critics of her work in this style often described the illustrations as "perverse" and compared her work to Tamara de Lempicka, a female Polish painter. Joseph Delteil was one of these frequent critics.

Before she died, she donated her work to the Museo Sívori in Buenos Aires.

Today, her works are displayed in the Victoria and Albert Museum in London, Museo Nacional de Bellas Artes in Buenos Aires, Museo Sívori in Buenos Aires, National Gallery of Scotland, in Edimburgh, MoMA in New York, the Fogg Art Museum at Harvard University, and Davidson Galleries in Seattle, Washington.

=== Personal life ===
Mariette Lydis first married Julius Koloman Pachoffer-Karñy in 1910. Her second marriage was to Jean Lydis in 1920, and shortly after, the couple moved to Athens, Greece in 1922. Her second marriage was short-lived, as she left her husband for an affair with Massimo Bontempelli while in Florence (1925), and then with Joseph Delteil in Paris (1928). That same year, she met Count Giuseppe Govone in France, and married him on August 1, 1934. Among other things, Govone was a publisher for a while, and helped produce many of Lydis's works. They stayed formally married until his death in Milan in 1948. However, already at the end for the 1930s, together with her partner, Erica Marx, she escaped Paris and the ensuing Nazi roundup of Jews. The couple lived for a brief time in Winchcombe, England before sailing as a refugee to Buenos Aires in July 1940. She and Marx lived and worked in Argentina until Lydis' death on April 26, 1970. She was buried in the Recoleta Cemetery in Buenos Aires.

It has been commonly stated that Lydis lived openly as a bisexual woman.

=== Legacy ===
Lydis never had children. Mariette Lydis operated a workshop where she trained future artists including Estela Pereda.

Her work was included in the 2019 exhibition City Of Women: Female artists in Vienna from 1900 to 1938 at the Österreichische Galerie Belvedere.

== Works ==
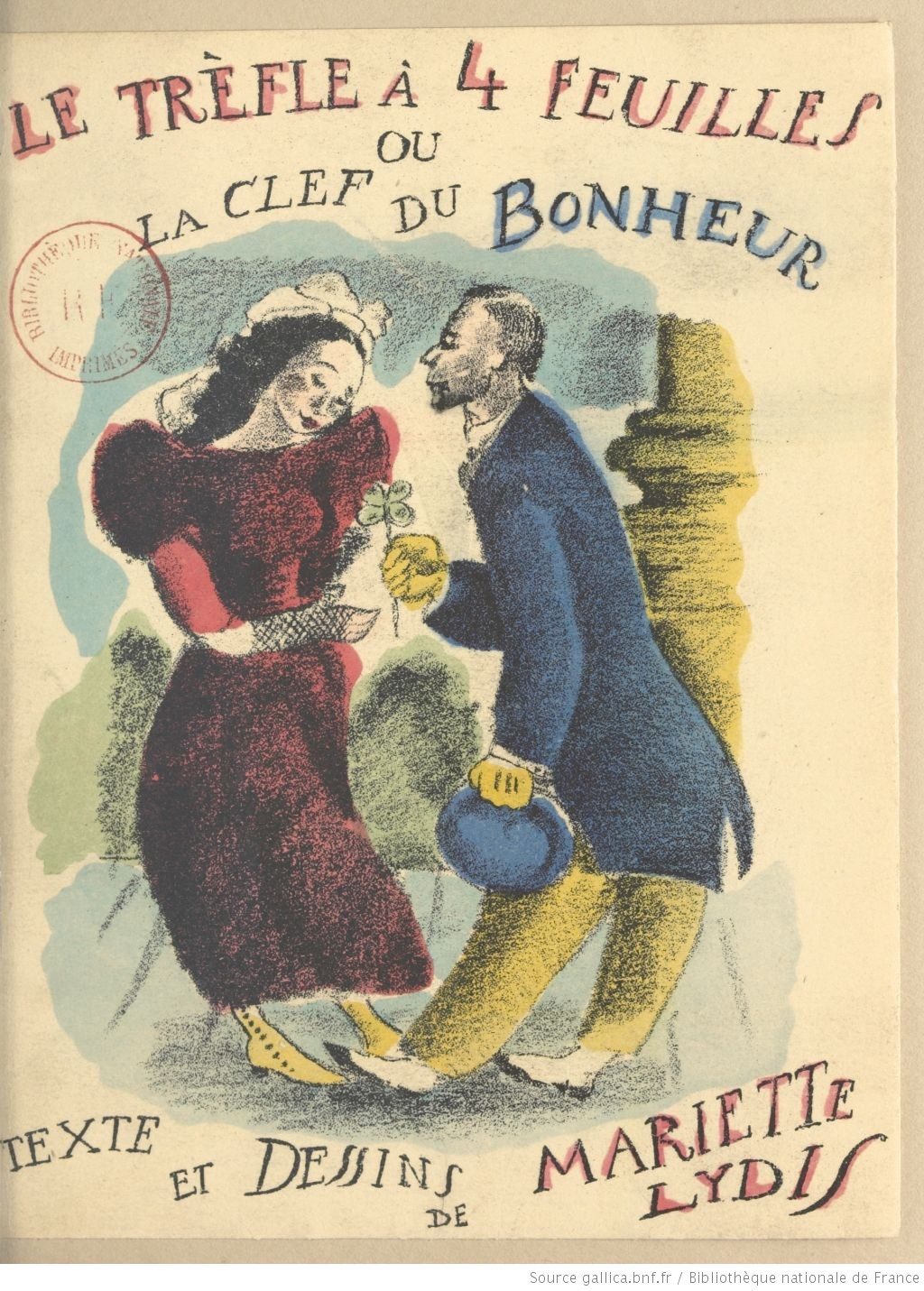
Illustrated book cover. Lydis, Mariette. Le Trefle a Quatre Feuilles : Ou La Clef Du Bonheur. Paris: G. Govone, 1935.

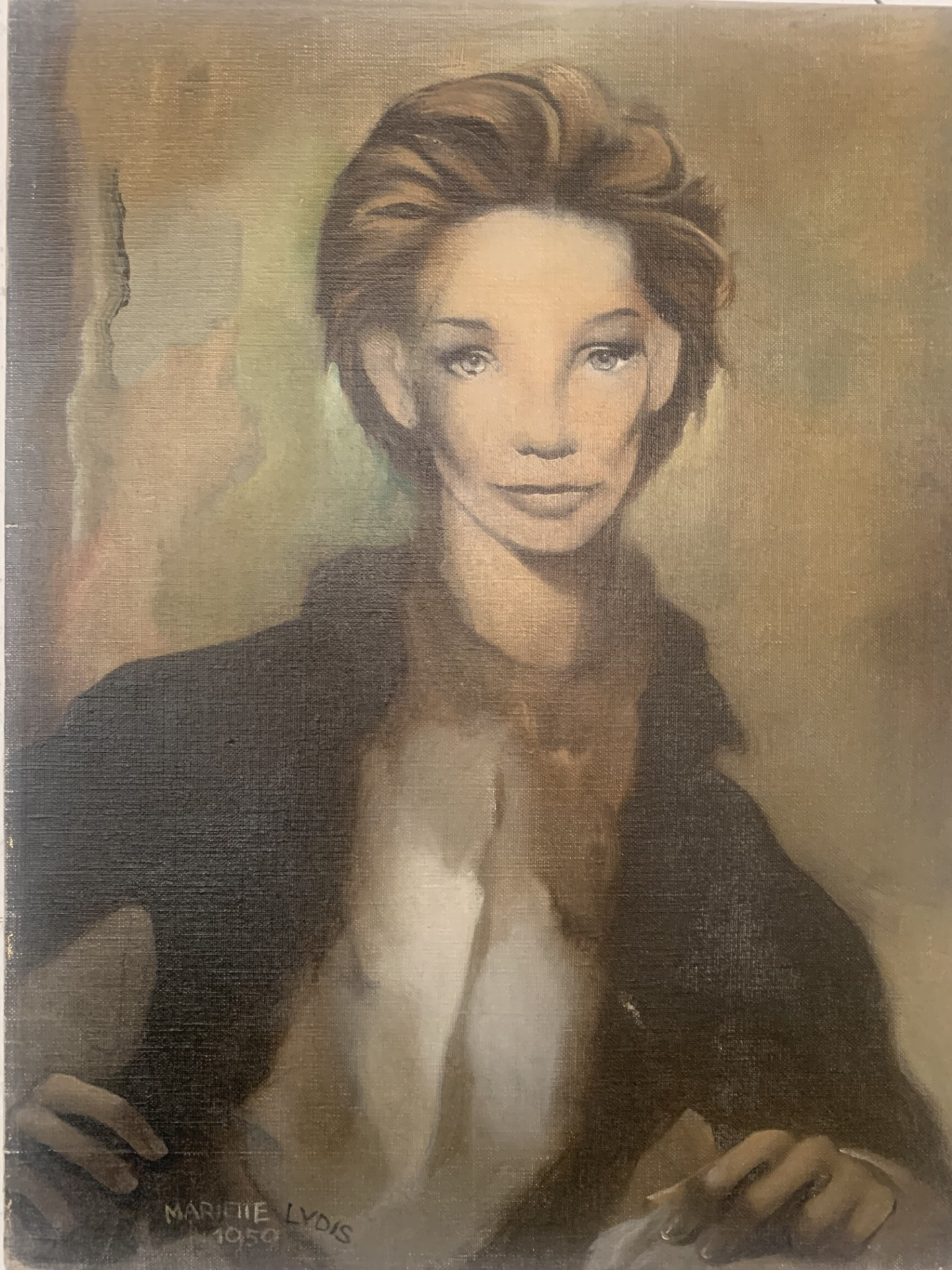
Woman Posing. Oil. 1950.

=== Style ===
Mariette Lydis was a printmaker who worked primarily in lithographs. Lydis was also a draughtswoman (of detailed technical drawings), illustrator, and painter. She worked in pencil, watercolor, charcoal, etching, and oil, producing prints, illuminated lithographic illustrations of stories and poetry, hand-colored drypoints, etchings, aquatints, drawings, and paintings. Her works rely heavily on the use of line, emphasizing illustration over decoration.

A journal excerpt is noted to cite: “[Mariette Lydis's art] represents the feminine outlook [and] gives us a facet of truth as seen by feminine eyes...I know of no artist--male or female--who can render the soul--the most elusive of all human concepts--as convincingly as Mariette Lydis.”

=== Inspiration ===
Lydis drew inspiration from Koran decoration and decorated Korans herself. Much of her portraiture features young women, including the lithograph Les Paradis artificiels (16 works, 1955), the pencil-and-watercolor drawing Iris (1940), and the oil paintings Jeune femme de profil (1933), Portrait de jeune fille (1955), and Jovencita (1950). Lydis also based some of her works, including Les Criminelles, on prisons and condemned French women. She was influenced heavily by the Japanese artist Tsuguharu Foujita, her friend in Montmartre.

=== Printed illustrations ===
Lydis's first published illustration was in The Cloak of Dreams by Béla Balázs, a compilation of Chinese fairy tales. Additionally, five illustrated etchings by Lydis can be found in Le Petit Jésus by Joseph Delteil. Other writers that Mariette Lydis illustrated for include Pedro Miguel Obligado, Henry de Montherland, Paul Valéry, Pierre Louys, Paul Verlaine, and Jules Superveille. She illustrated Melancholía, one of Obligado's Argentinian books of poems (https://www.todocoleccion.net/libros-segunda-mano-poesia/melancolia-pedro-miguel-obligado-~x47933802).

=== Publicity ===
Mariette Lydis's work appeared in various newspaper and journal articles during her exhibitions, especially at the St. George's Galleries and the Leicester Galleries. These articles feature reproductions of her lithographic pencil drawings and watercolors.
