= Argentina–Austria relations =

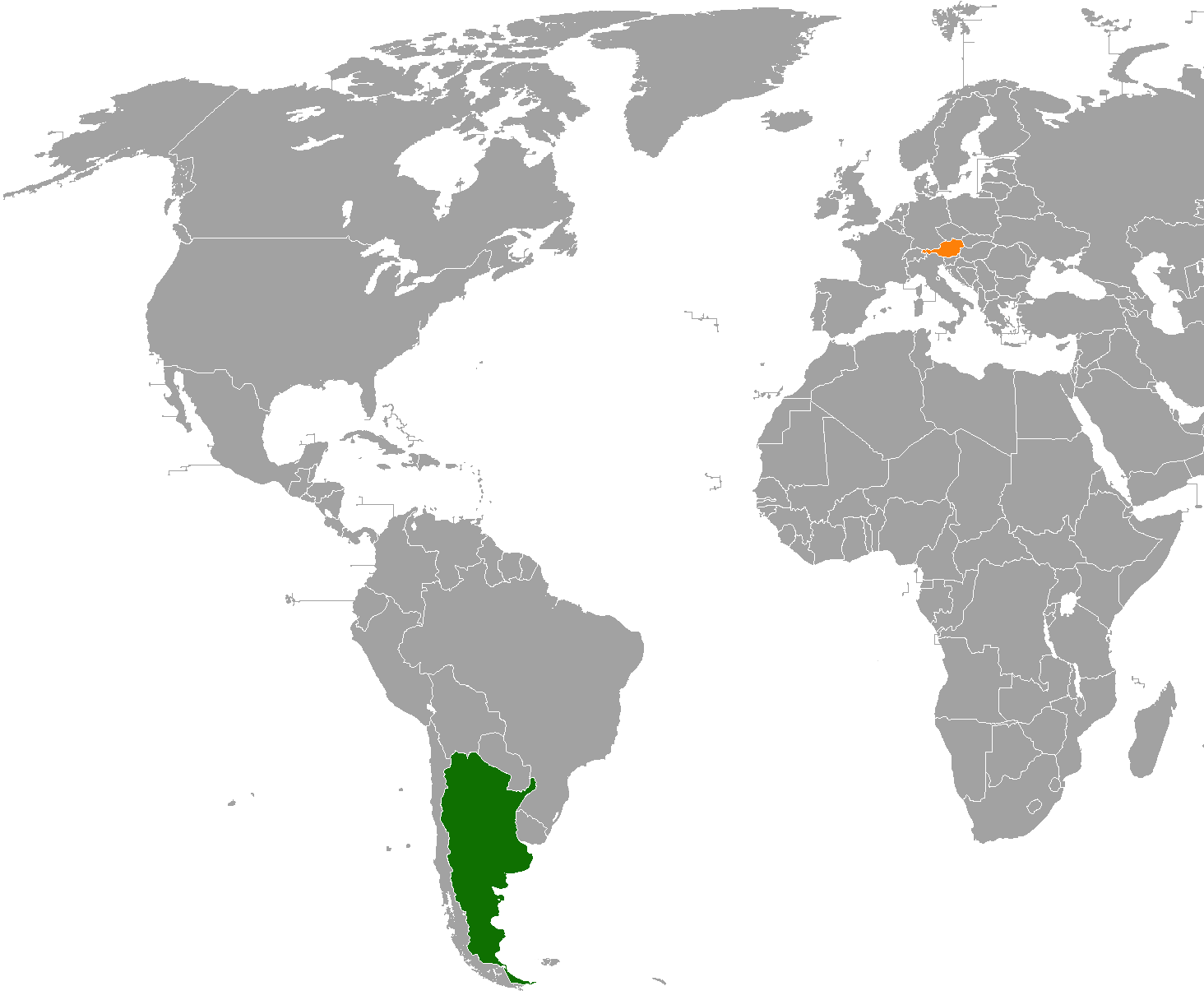
- Argentina: Austria

Argentina–Austria relations have existed between the Argentine Republic and the Republic of Austria for decades. Both nations are members of the World Trade Organization and the United Nations.

== History ==
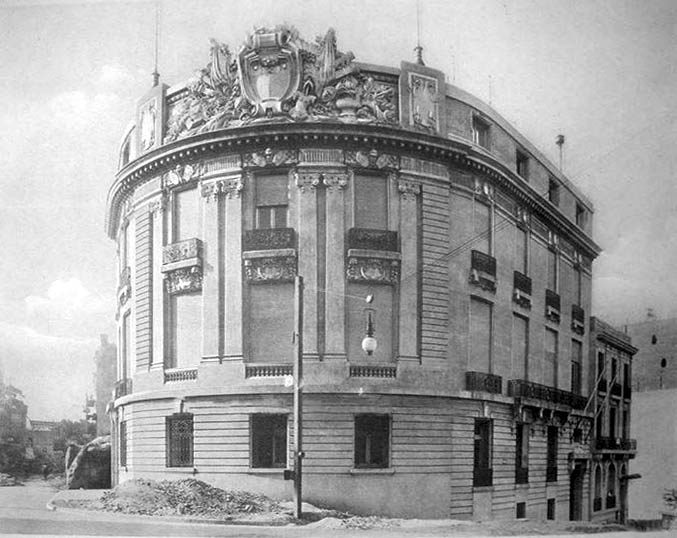
Embassy of the Austro-Hungarian Empire in Buenos Aires, 1914.

In 1864, Argentina and the Austro-Hungarian Empire established diplomatic relations. By the early 20th century, a few migrants from Austria had immigrated to Argentina. In 1921, Argentina donated 5 million Argentine pesos to a devastated Austria which had emerged as an independent nation after World War I. In gratitude, Austria named a street in Vienna (Argentinierstraβe). The majority of Austrian migrants who arrived to Argentina arrived in two great migratory waves during the First and Second World Wars.

In October 1994, Argentine President Carlos Menem became the first Argentine head-of-state to pay a visit to Austria. In December 2000, Argentina limited its relations with Austria with regard to the participation of the Alliance for the Future of Austria party led by Jörg Haider who was known for statements in praise of Nazi policies. In 2006, Argentine President Néstor Kirchner paid a visit to Austria to attend the Fourth Latin America, the Caribbean and the European Union Summit in Vienna. In May 2008, Austrian Chancellor Alfred Gusenbauer paid a visit to Argentina. There have since been numerous visits between leaders of both nations.

In 2018, political consultations were held between leading officials of both nations. In 2019, there is a community of approximately 30,000 Austrians residing in Argentina.

== Bilateral relations ==
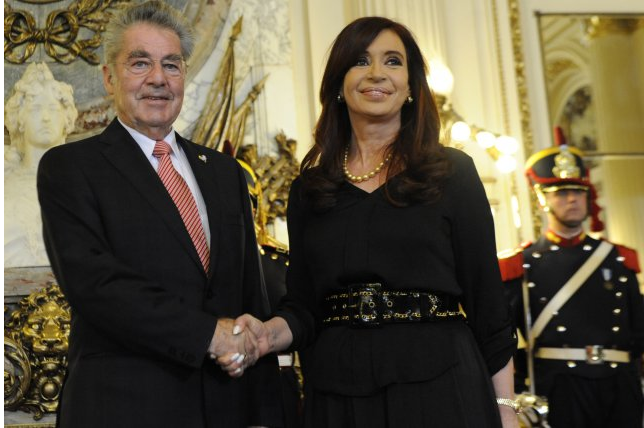
Argentine President Cristina Fernández de Kirchner meeting with Austrian President Heinz Fischer during his visit to Buenos Aires, 2012.

Both nations have signed several agreements such as an Agreement on compensation for accidents at work by Austrians working in Argentina (1926); Agreement on film cooperation (1958); Treaty on the conduct of military service for dual citizens (1979); Agreement on economic and industrial cooperation (1979); Agreement on scientific and cultural cooperation (1980); Agreement on the Promotion and Protection of Investments (1992); Air Service Agreement (2008) and an Agreement for the elimination of double taxation in the field of taxes on income and property and for the prevention of tax reduction and avoidance (2019).

== Trade ==
In 2017, trade between both nations totaled US$304 million. Argentina's main exports to Austria include: parts and supplies for the automotive industry, beef, fruit and soybean oils and derivatives. Austria's main exports to Argentina include: machinery and equipment, pharmaceutical products, medical and measuring instruments, orthopedic products and iron and steel products.

== Resident diplomatic missions ==
- Argentina has an embassy in Vienna.
- Austria has an embassy in Buenos Aires.
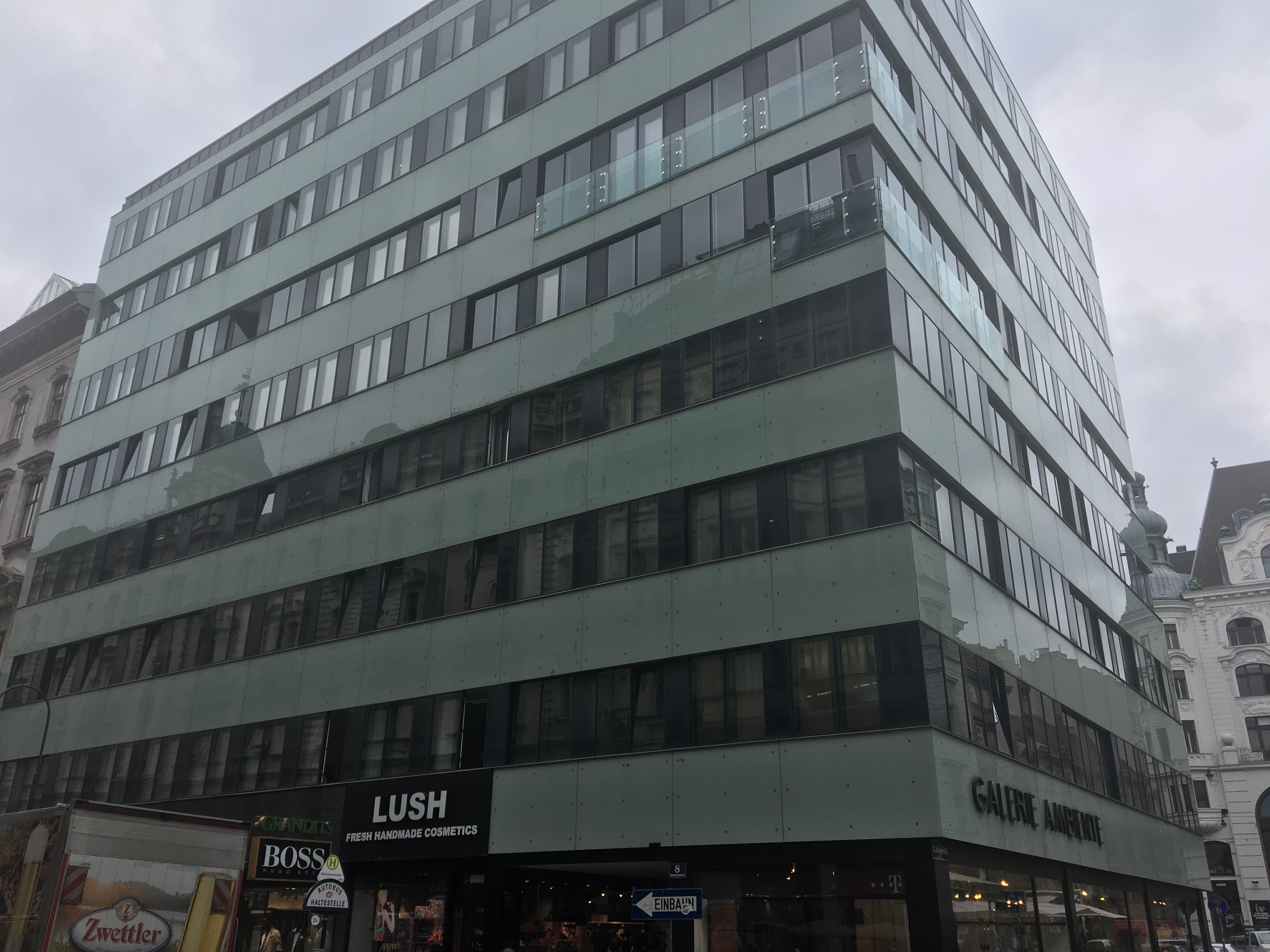
Building hosting the Embassy of Argentina in Vienna

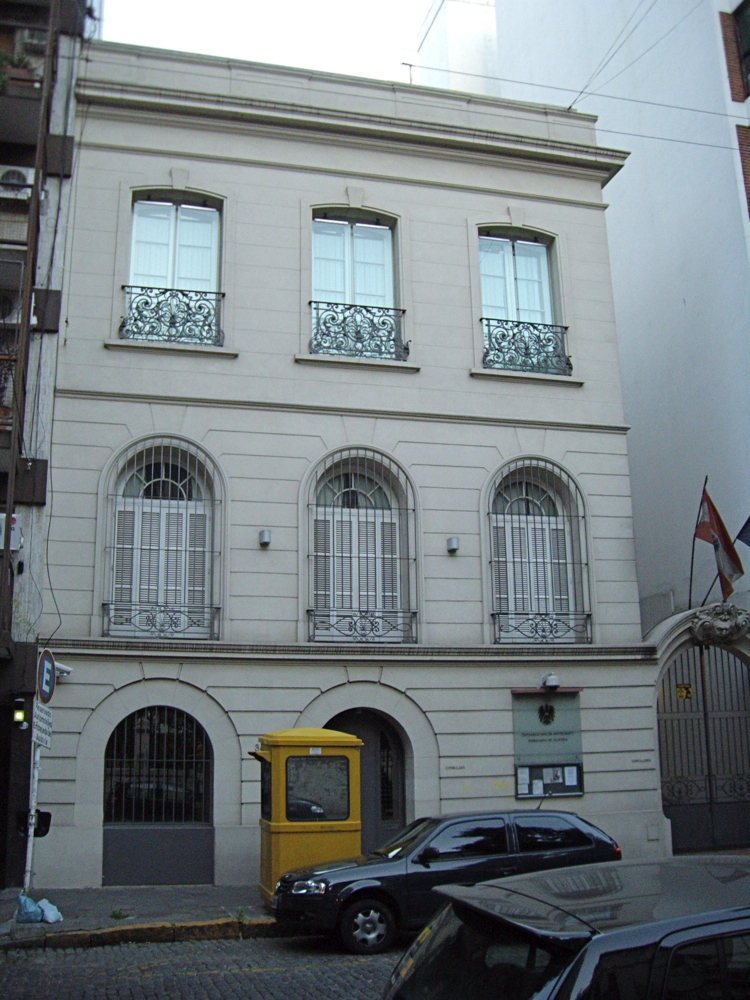
Embassy of Austria in Buenos Aires

== See also ==
- Foreign relations of Argentina
- Foreign relations of Austria
- Austrian Argentines
