= San Benito, Entre Ríos =

San Benito Colonia 3 de Febrero
- Municipality and village
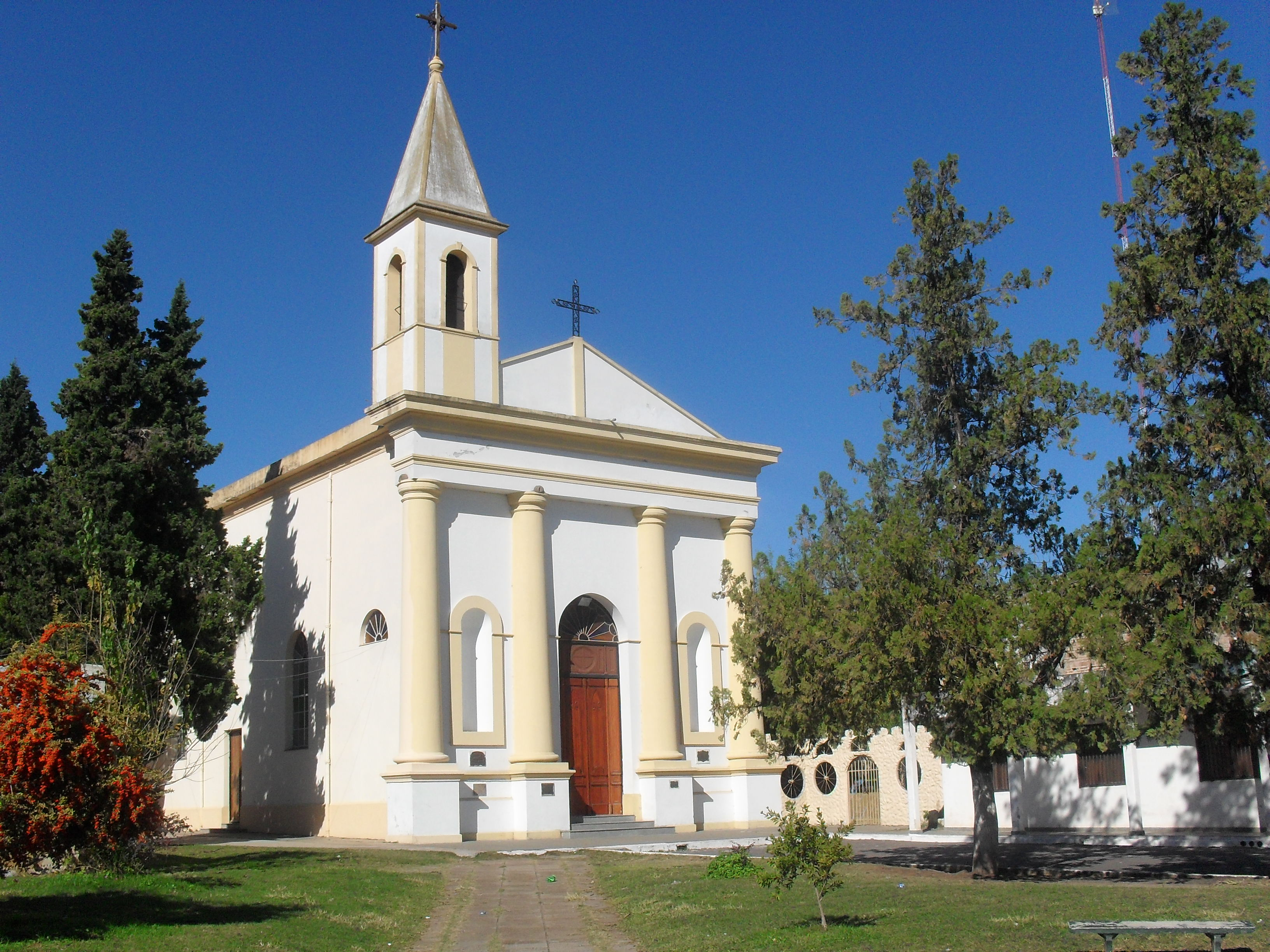
- Interactive map of San Benito
- Coordinates: 31°47′S 60°26′W
- Country: Argentina
- Province: Entre Ríos Province

Government
  - Intendant: Exequiel Donda (Cambiemos)
- Time zone: UTC−3 (ART)

San Benito is a village and municipality in Entre Ríos Province in north-eastern Argentina.
