= Colegio Pestalozzi (Argentina) =

- Pestalozzi Schule

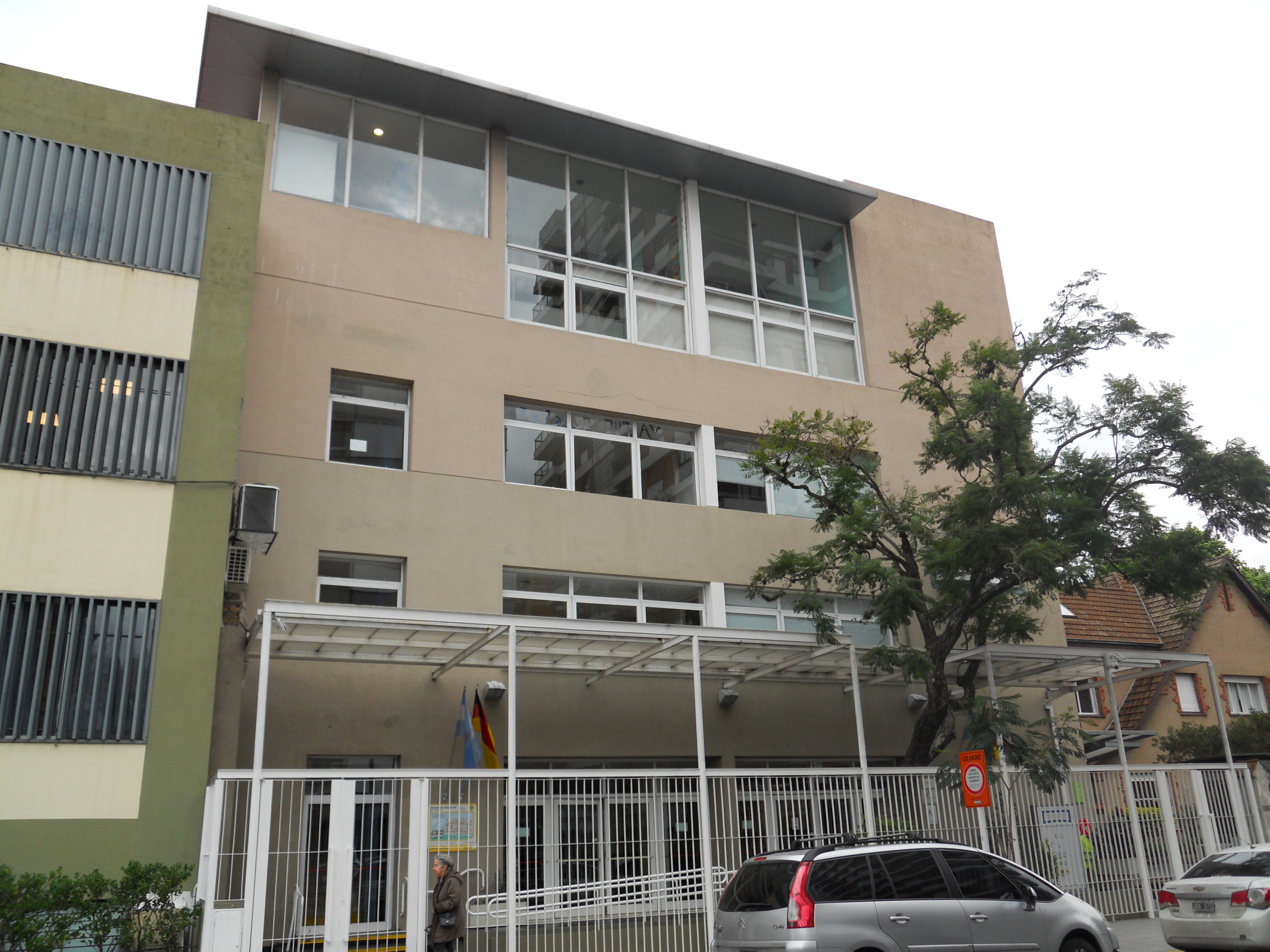

Location
- Ramón Freire 1824; Buenos Aires; Argentina; 34.5692°S 58.4622°W

Information
- Type: Private
- Established: 1 March 1934
- Website: http://www.pestalozzi.edu.ar

Colegio Pestalozzi (German: Pestalozzi Schule) is a German international school in Belgrano, Buenos Aires. It is governed by the Asociación Cultural Pestalozzi. It serves kindergarten through secondary school: Colegio Pestalozzi offers elementary and secondary education as well as an "initial level" for children from two to five years.

It was founded in 1934 by Dr. Ernesto Alemann, an Argentine of Swiss origin. It was founded in opposition to the Nazi regime that was prevalent in Germany at the time, as a consequence of the incoming migration from Germany into Argentina. The school welcomed many pedagogues that were fleeing Germany for political reasons, as well as many German-Jewish, mostly secular, students. Colegio Pesalozzi houses the first Stolpersteine in Buenos Aires (and the first outside of Europe), a plate that commemorates the victims of Nazism.

Alemann's aim was to create a place for free and humanistic education in accordance with the thoughts of the Swiss pedagogue Johann Heinrich Pestalozzi, where the values of the central European culture and the German language could be upheld.
