= Ernesto Alemann =

Ernesto Alemann (1893–1982) was the son of Swiss immigrants to Argentina. For several decades he was the editor-in-chief and publisher of the family newspaper Argentinisches Tageblatt, printed in German, in Buenos Aires. Ernesto Alemann played an important role in the opposition to Nazi Germany in the 1930s in Argentina, and was greatly respected in the German colony of Argentina for the role he took in opposing Hitler, in particular in the editorials and articles of the Argentinisches Tageblatt. In order to have an alternative to the Nazified Goethe School in Buenos Aires, Ernesto Alemann founded the Pestalozzi school called Colegio Pestalozzi in Buenos Aires in 1934.
