= San Jerónimo Norte =

Town in Santa Fe Province, Argentina

- Location in Argentina
- Coordinates: 31°33′09.9″S 61°04′40.6″W
- Country: Argentina
- Province: (Santa Fe Province) Santa Fe
- Department: Las Colonias
- Founded: 1858

Area
  - Total: 134 km^{2} (52 sq mi)
- Elevation: 42 m (138 ft)

Population (2010 census [INDEC])
  - Total: 6,466
- CPA Base: S 3015
- Area code: 03404

San Jerónimo Norte is a town in the Las Colonias Department of Santa Fe Province, Argentina. It was founded in 1858 by Swiss immigrants.
