= List of international presidential trips made by Mauricio Macri =

This is a list of international presidential trips made by Mauricio Macri, the 53rd President of Argentina. During his presidency, Mauricio Macri visited 20 countries as of May 2017.

== Summary of international trips ==
Number of visits	Country
4 visits	United States
3 visits	Chile
2 visits	Brazil, China, Colombia, Germany, Italy, Japan, Paraguay, Peru, Vatican City
1 visit	Belgium, Canada, Ecuador, France, India, Indonesia, Netherlands, Qatar, Spain, Switzerland, United Arab Emirates, Uruguay

== 2015 ==
The following international trips were made by President Mauricio Macri in 2015:

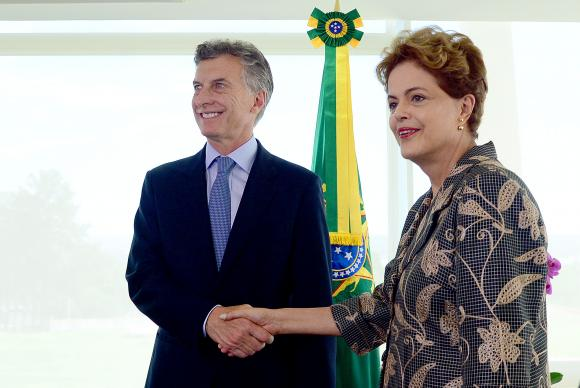
Macri made his first visit as President-Elect to Brasília for a meeting with President Dilma Rousseff.

Country	Areas visited	Date(s)	Notes
Paraguay	Asunción	21 December	Further information: Argentina–Paraguay relations During his first participation in the Mercosur Summit, President Macri called for "the prompt release of political prisoners in Venezuela" and warned that the regional bloc "can be no room for political persecution for ideological reasons or illegitimate forecast freedom for thinking differently". He also called for jointly fight against poverty and drug trafficking.

== 2016 ==
The following international trips were made by President Mauricio Macri in 2016:

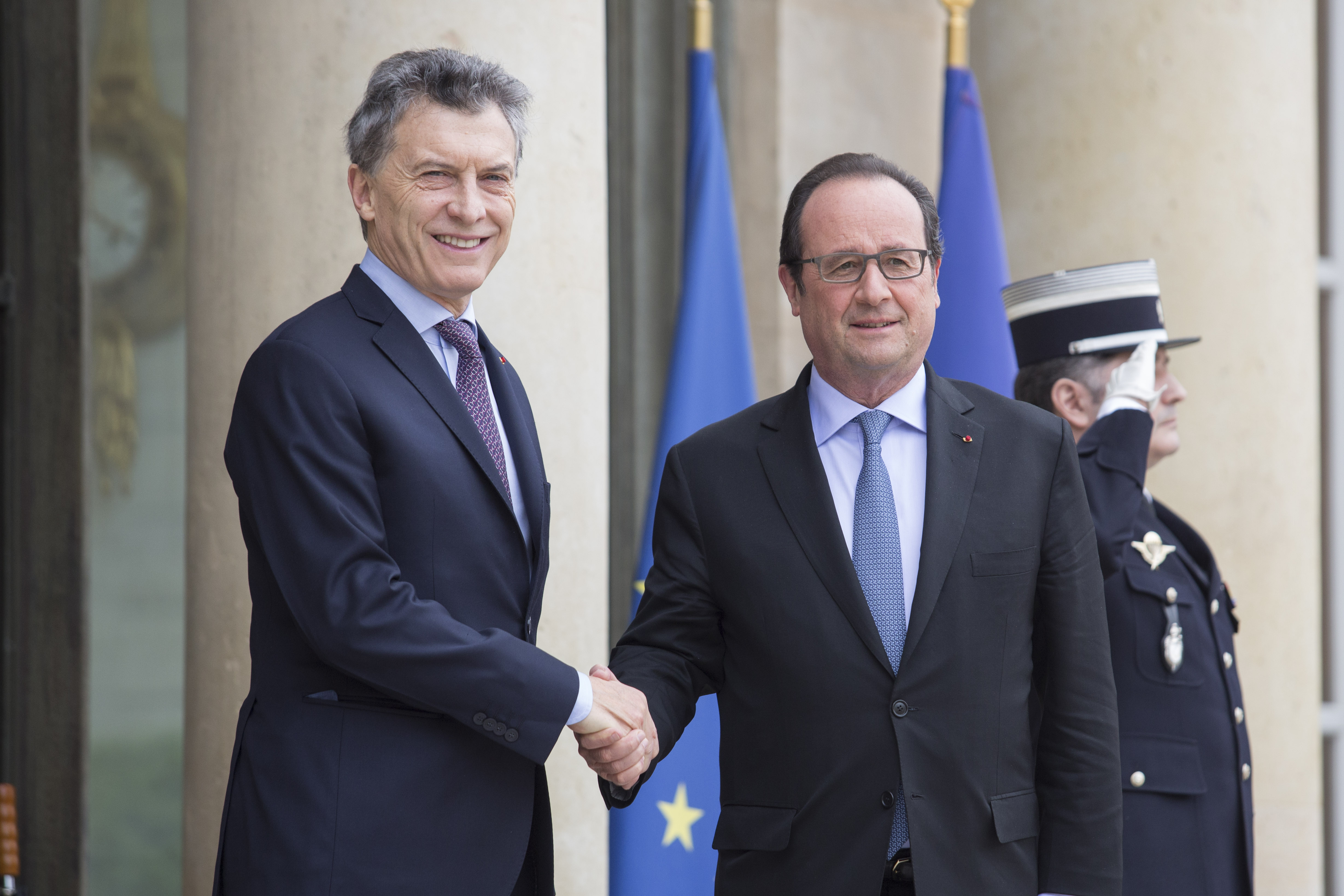
Macri with François Hollande shake hands at the Elysee palace in Paris on 2 July 2016 ahead of their meeting.

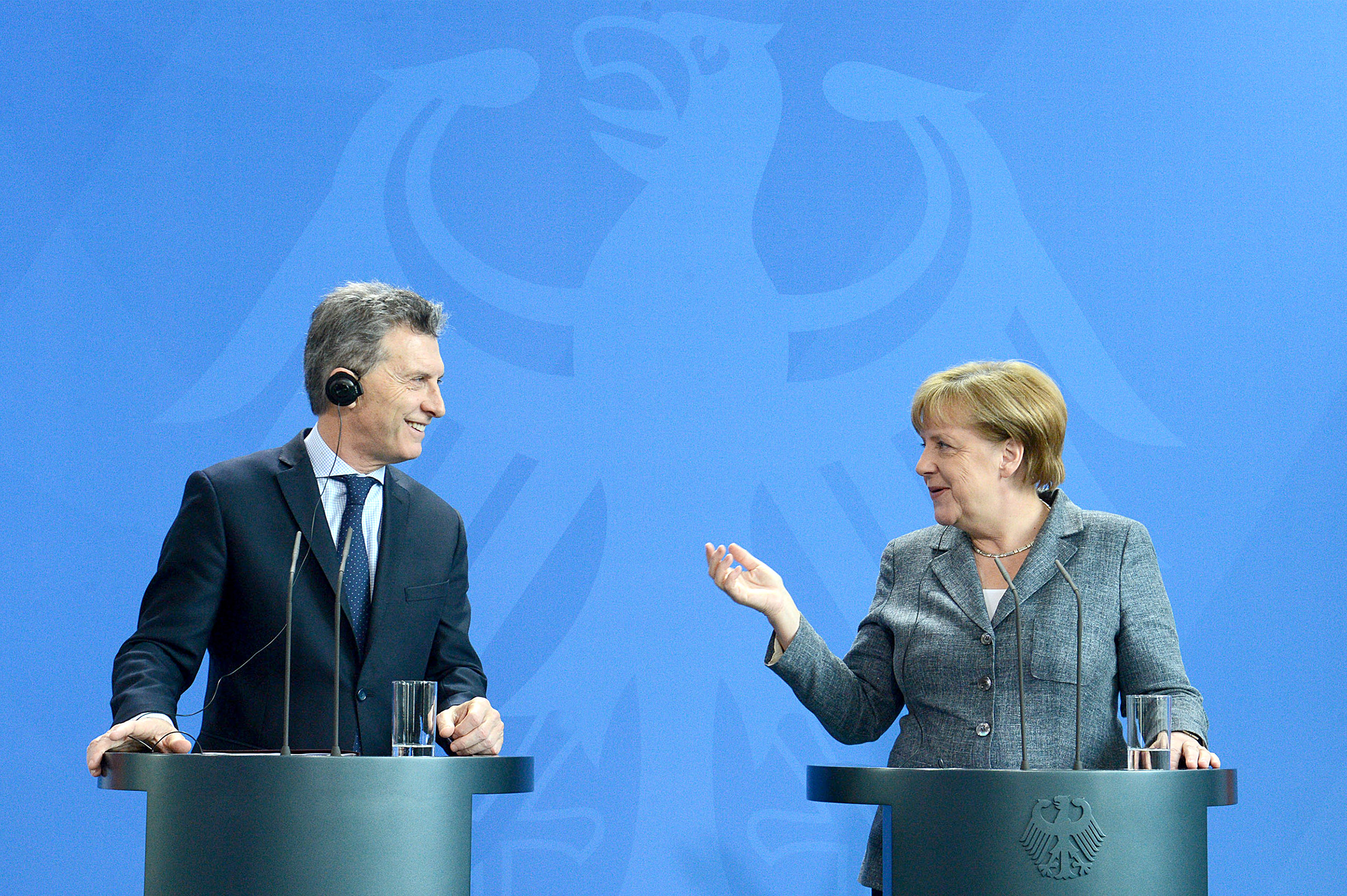
Macri with Chancellor Angela Merkel in Berlin, during his official visit to Germany, July 2016.

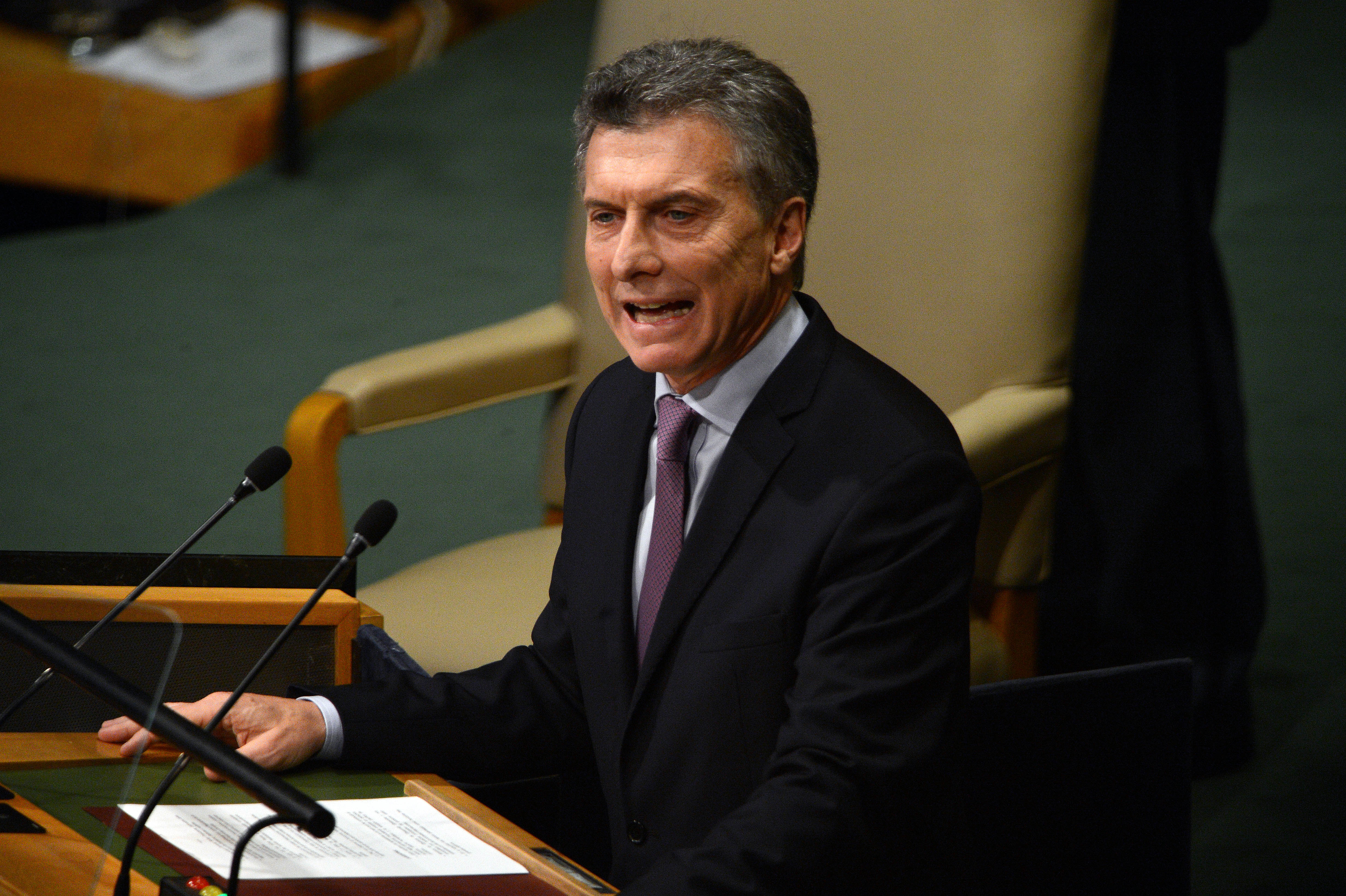
Macri speaking at the 71st General Assembly of the United Nations in New York.

Country	Areas visited	Date(s)	Notes
Uruguay	Colonia del Sacramento	7 January	Further information: Argentina–Uruguay relations President Macri traveled to Uruguay, for a meeting with President Tabare Vazquez, under the start of his international agenda. They officially postulated the Uruguay–Argentina 2030 FIFA World Cup bid.
Switzerland	Davos	20–23 January	Further information: Argentina–Switzerland relations President Macri traveled to the World Economic Forum Summit in Davos accompanied by his former rival in the presidential elections Sergio Massa.
Vatican City; Italy	Vatican City; Rome	27 February	Further information: Argentina–Holy See relations and Argentina-Italy relations President Macri visited Pope Francis in his first visit to the Vatican as President. After that, Macri met with Italian Prime Minister, Matteo Renzi.
United States	Washington D.C.	31 March; 1 April	Further information: Argentina–United States relations President Macri traveled to the U.S. on the occasion of the 2016 Nuclear Security Summit.
Colombia	Bogotá; Medellín	15–16 June	Further information: Argentina–Colombia relations President Macri traveled to Colombia for a meeting with President Juan Manuel Santos. After that, Macri participated in the World Economic Forum on Latin America 2016.
Chile	Puerto Varas	30 June; 1 July	Further information: Argentina–Chile relations President Macri traveled to Chile for the Summit of the Pacific Alliance.
France	Paris	2 July	Further information: Argentina–France relations President Macri opened his European tour in Paris meeting with French President François Hollande. He said the meeting was "very good" and expressed his desire to increase trade between Mercosur and the European Union.
Belgium	Brussels	3–4 July	Further information: Argentina–Belgium relations and Argentina–European Union relations President Macri met with the High Representative of the European Union for Foreign Policy, Federica Mogherini, at the headquarters of the European Commission, and then have lunch with President of the European Council, Donald Tusk, at that institution. In the afternoon he was received along with his wife, the First Lady Juliana Awada at the Royal Palace of Brussels by King Philippe and Queen Mathilde.
Germany	Berlin	5–6 July	Further information: Argentina–Germany relations President Macri traveled to Berlin for an official visit to Germany. This was announced by Foreign Minister Susana Malcorra in a press conference shared with the German Minister of Foreign Affairs, Frank-Walter Steinmeier in Buenos Aires. He met with Chancellor Angela Merkel and President Joachim Gauck.
United States	Idaho	7–8 July	Further information: Argentina–United States relations President Macri traveled to Idaho to participate in the Sun Valley Conference Summit chaired by tycoon Bill Gates, in the state of Idaho, the northwestern United States. The presence of Macri is given after ended his official visit to France, Belgium and Germany.
Peru	Lima	28 July	Further information: Argentina–Peru relations President Macri traveled to Lima to participate in the Presidential Inauguration of Pedro Pablo Kuczynski.
Brazil	Rio de Janeiro	5 August	Further information: Argentina–Brazil relations President Macri traveled to Rio de Janeiro on the occasion of the 2016 Summer Olympics opening ceremony.
Qatar	Doha	3 September	President Macri met the Emir of Qatar, Tamim bin Hamad Al Thani.
China	Hangzhou	4–5 September	Further information: Argentina–China relations President Macri traveled to China to attend the G-20 summit meeting in Hangzhou.
United States	New York City	19 September	Further information: Argentina–United States relations Macri traveled to New York for the 71st UN General Assembly.
Colombia	Cartagena de Indias	27 September	Further information: Argentina–Colombia relations President Macri attended the signing of the Colombia Peace Agreements between President Juan Manuel Santos and FARC Leader Timoleón Jiménez.
Vatican City; Italy	Vatican City; Rome	15 October	Further information: Argentina–Holy See relations and Argentina-Italy relations President Macri visited Pope Francis along with First Lady Juliana Awada and their child, Antonia Macri, his daughter Agustina Macri and her daughter Valentina Barbier. Later, the President met with diplomats and traveled to Florence where Prime Minister Matteo Renzi had a dinner in their honour. The President assisted as well to the Canonization of José Gabriel del Rosario Brochero.

== 2017 ==
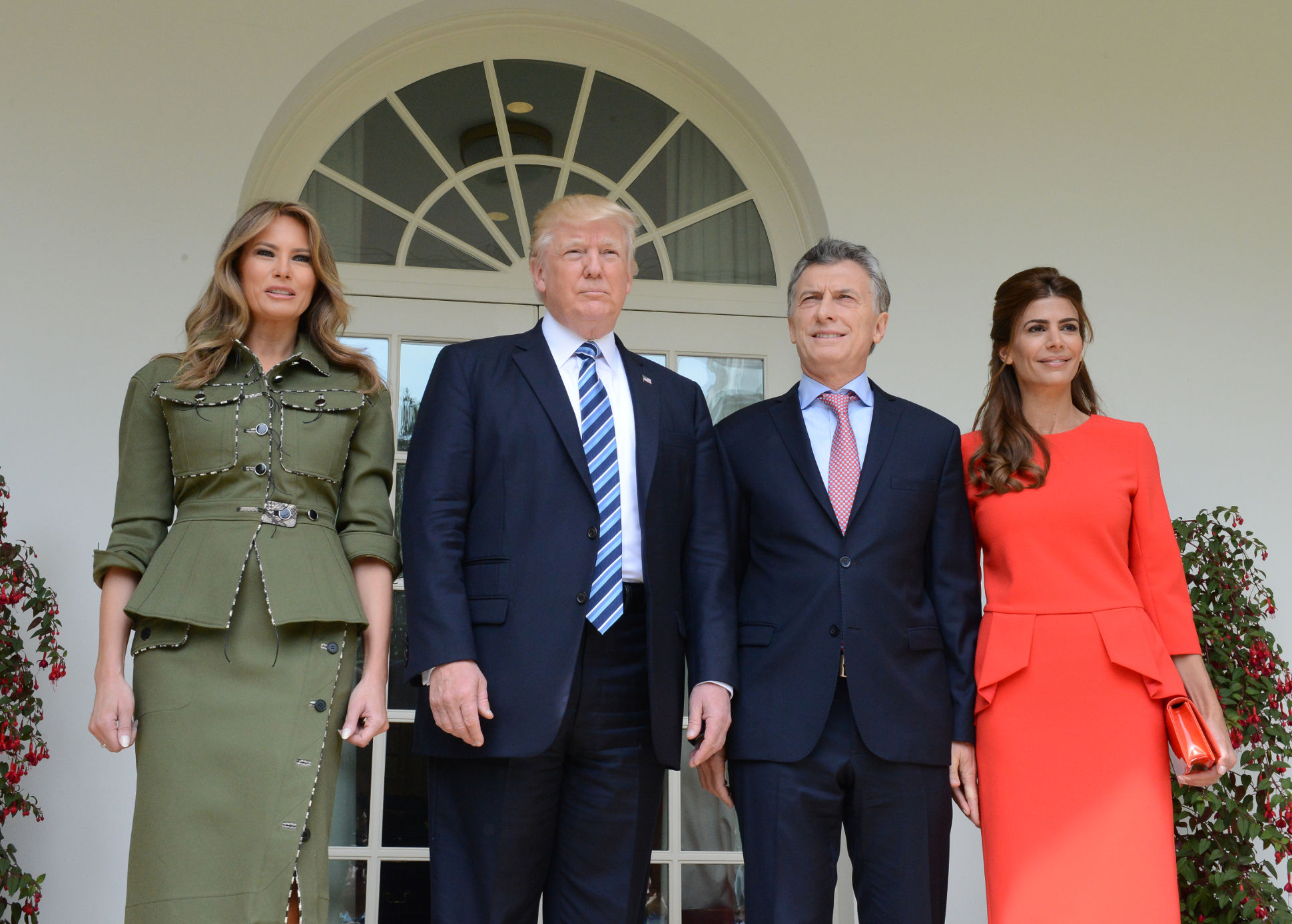
Melania Trump, Donald Trump, Mauricio Macri and Juliana Awada at the White House.

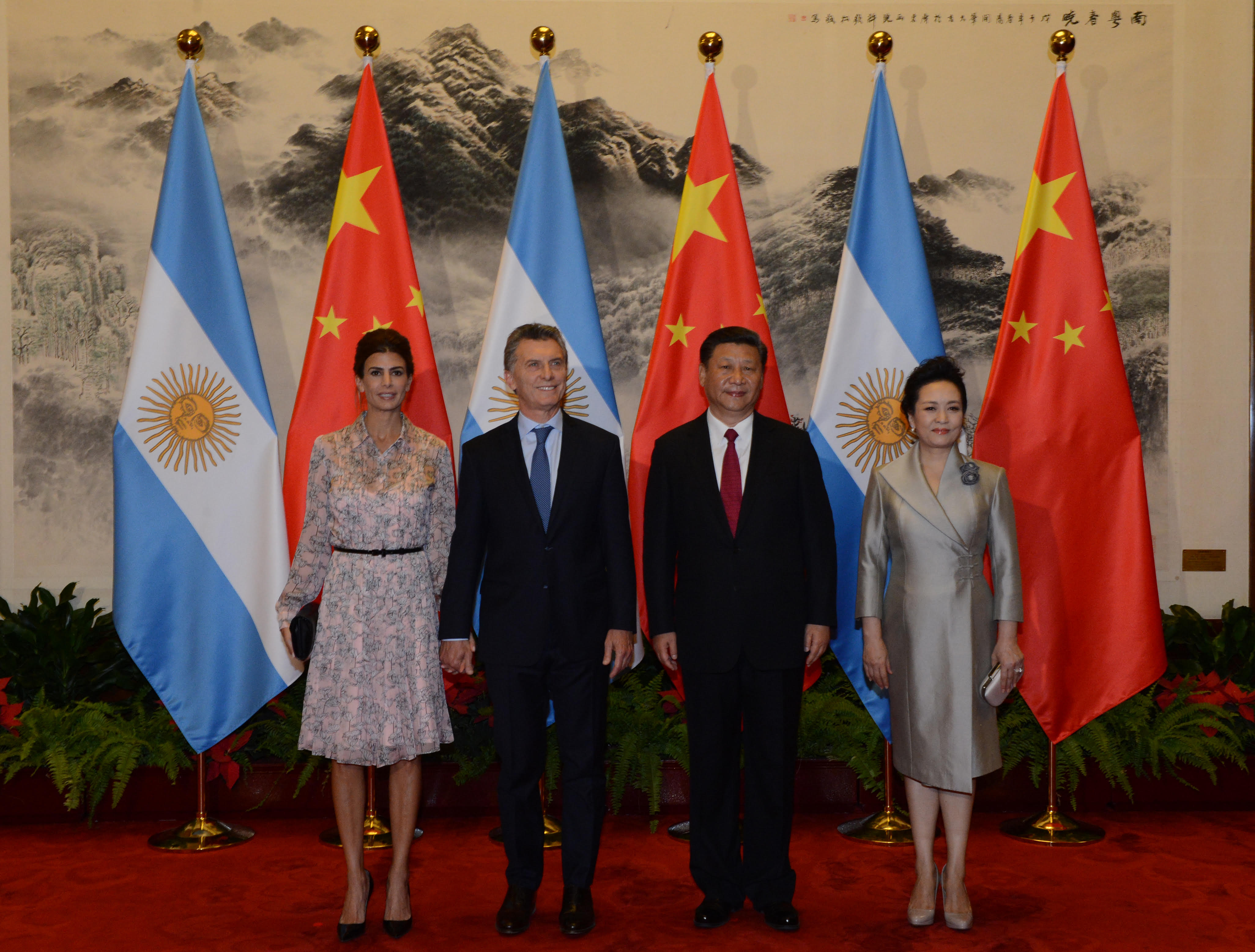
Juliana Awada, Mauricio Macri, Xi Jinping and Peng Liyuan at the Great Hall of the People.

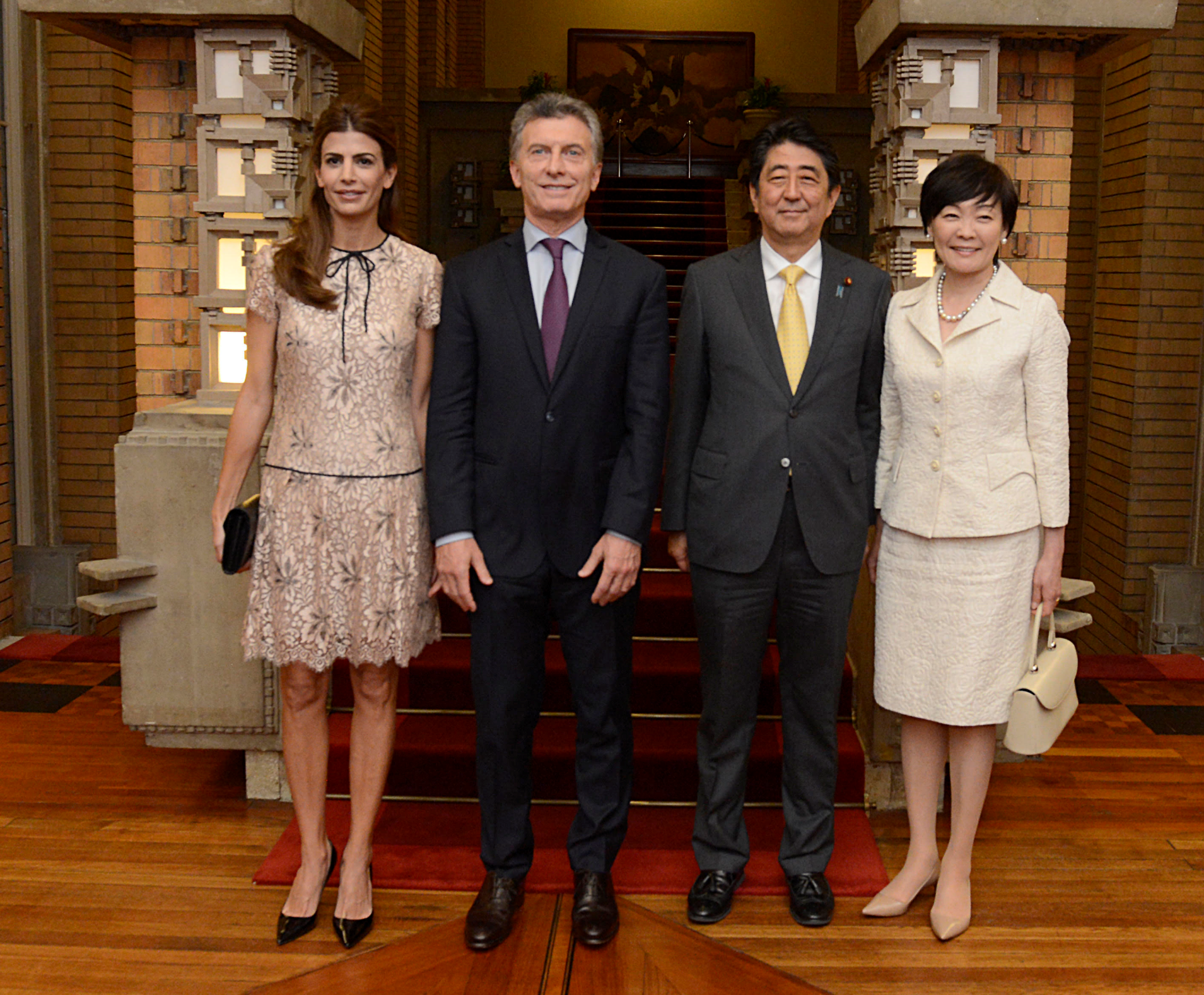
Juliana Awada, Mauricio Macri, Shinzō Abe and Akie Abe.

Country	Areas visited	Date (s)	Notes
Spain	Madrid	20–25 February	Further information: Argentina–Spain relations Macri traveled to Spain with 200 businessmen. Met with the King Felipe VI and Queen Letizia Ortiz, and the President of the Government Mariano Rajoy.
Paraguay	Asunción	16 March	Further information: Argentina–Paraguay relations Macri met with the President Horacio Cartes to cooperate in the fight against narcotraffic on the border and to renegotiate the debt for the construction of the Yacyretá Dam.
Netherlands	Amsterdam	27–28 March	Macri and Juliana Awade met with the King Willem-Alexander and Queen Máxima. They visited the Anne Frank House, Organisation for the Prohibition of Chemical Weapons and the International Criminal Court.
United States	Houston; Washington, D.C.	26–27 April	Further information: Argentina–United States relations Macri visited the plants of Tenaris and Dow in Houston. The next day he and Juliana Awada met Melania and Donald Trump at the White House. Trump decided to lift the import embargo of Argentine lemons and agreed to support Argentina's decision to join the OECD.
United Arab Emirates	Dubai	12 May	Macri and Juliana Awada were accompanied by Emilio Monzó, President of the Chamber of Deputies; Alberto Weretilneck, Governor of Río Negro; Sergio Uñac, Governor of San Juan; Gerardo Morales, Governor of Jujuy; Juan José Aranguren, Minister of Energy; Rogelio Frigerio, Minister of Interior and Guillermo Dietrich, Minister of Transport. They met with the Prime Minister Mohammed bin Rashid Al Maktoum
China	Beijing; Shanghai	14–18 May	Further information: Argentina–China relations On Sunday 14 Macri and Juliana Awada met with Xi Jinping in the Great Hall of the People. Then they participated in the Belt and Road Forum. On Monday 15 Macri went to Yanqi Lake International Convention & Exhibition Center and worked with the leaders participating in the Forum. On Tuesday 16 Macri met with businessmen from energy, transport and infrastructure areas. Then went to the Chinese Academy of Sciences to celebrate the 45th Anniversary of the Establishment of Diplomatic Relations between Argentina and China. On Wednesday 17 Macri and Juliana Awada deposited a wreath in the Monument to the People's Heroes, in the Tiananmen Square. Then Macri met in the Great Hall of the People with the Premier of the People's Republic of China, Li Keqiang, and then with the Chairman of the Standing Committee of the National People's Congress, Zhang Dejiang. On Thursday 18 Macri went to Shanghai to the official inauguration of the Pavilion of the Argentine Republic in the SIAL-China Exhibition at the New International Expo Center.
Japan	Tokyo	18–19 May	Further information: Argentina–Japan relations Macri shared a breakfast with Japanese businessmen at The Prince Park Tower Tokyo Hotel. In that place he said a few words at the opening of the Japan-Argentina Economic Forum. Then Macri and Juliana Awada met with the Prime Minister Shinzō Abe and his wife Akie Abe at the official residence. Macri was received by the chairman of Toyota, Takeshi Uchiyamada. On Friday 19 Macri and Juliana Awada went to the Meiji Shrine and then met with the Emperor Akihito and Empress Michiko in the Tokyo Imperial Palace.
Ecuador	Quito	24 May	Macri traveled to Ecuador to attend the inauguration of Lenín Moreno as new President of Ecuador.
Chile	Santiago	27 June	Macri traveled to Chile for a meeting with President Michelle Bachelet, which whom he discussed integration prospects between Mercosur and the Pacific Alliance.
Germany	Hamburg	7–8 July	Further information: Argentina–Germany relations President Macri traveled to Germany to attend the G-20 summit meeting in Hamburg.

== 2018 ==
Country	Areas visited	Date(s)	Notes
Chile	Valparaíso	11 March	Ceremony of inauguration of the Chilean president Sebastian Piñera
Peru	Lima	13–14 April	8th Summit of the Americas
Canada	La Malbaie	8–10 June	44th G7 summit
Guatemala	Antigua Guatemala	15–16 November 2018	Further information: Argentina–Guatemala relations Ibero-American Summit

== 2019 ==
Country	Areas visited	Date(s)	Notes
Brazil	Brasília	16 January	President Macri traveled to Brazil for a meeting with President Jair Bolsonaro.
India	New Delhi	17-19 February	President Macri traveled to India for a state visit and met with Prime Minister Narendra Modi.
Indonesia	Jakarta	26 June	Further information: Argentina–Indonesia relations President Macri traveled to Indonesia to meet with President Joko Widodo.
Japan	Osaka	27–29 June	Further information: Argentina–Japan relations President Macri traveled to Japan to attend the G-20 summit meeting in Osaka.
Switzerland	Zurich	30 June	President Macri received a decoration by the FIFA.

== See also ==
- Foreign relations of Argentina
