= Ecuadorian Argentines =

Total population
- 8,879 (by birth, 2022); 24,535 (estimate, 2025)

Regions with significant populations
- Predominantly the Greater Buenos Aires

Languages
- Ecuadorian Spanish; Rioplatense Spanish

Religion
- Roman Catholicism

Related ethnic groups
- Colombian Argentines

Ecuadorian Argentines (Spanish: ecuato-argentinos) are Argentine citizens of partial or full Ecuadorian descent, or Ecuadorians citizens who have migrated to and settled in Argentina. Although comparatively small among South American immigrant communities in Argentina, it grew substantially during the early 21st century. Contemporary Ecuadorian migration has been closely associated with higher education, professional training and temporary residence, with many migrants initially intending to return to Ecuador after completing their studies.

The community is concentrated mainly in Buenos Aires, where Ecuadorian students attend public and private universities. Its forms of social organisation have included student networks, restaurants, sporting and cultural activities, and online groups connecting migrants with one another and with Ecuador.

== Overview ==
Ecuadorian migration to Argentina remained limited during most of the 20th century. It became more visible from the late 1990s and early 2000s, particularly through the arrival of university students and young professionals. In 2004, 329 Ecuadorians graduated from Argentine universities, the largest number among foreign graduates recorded that year.

A study of Ecuadorian students enrolled in event-management programmes during the 2000s identified several reasons for choosing Argentina: the perceived quality and professional orientation of Argentine institutions, the limited availability of comparable programmes in Ecuador, opportunities to gain professional experience and a favourable cost–benefit relationship. Recommendations from friends and relatives and the responsiveness of educational institutions also influenced the choice of destination.

Research published in 2014 classified Ecuadorian immigration, together with Colombian immigration, as an emerging regional migration. It described a predominantly young population seeking educational and professional training rather than permanent settlement. Gastronomy, sport, cultural practices and information and communication technologies were identified as important means of forming community networks and participating in Argentine society.

== Demographics ==
The 2022 Argentine national census recorded 8,879 residents born in Ecuador, compared with 4,820 in the 2010 census. The figure represented approximately 0.5% of Argentina's foreign-born population. The census figure is a national count based on country of birth and is not a specific estimate for Buenos Aires. It excludes Argentina-born descendants of Ecuadorian migrants. It also differs from statistics on residence permits, consular registrations and border crossings, which measure administrative procedures or movements rather than the population present in the country on a particular date. The National Registry of Persons of Argentina, using information from the National Directorate for Migration, estimated the total population of Ecuadorian-born residents in June 2025 at 24,535.

Buenos Aires has nevertheless been consistently identified as the principal destination for Ecuadorian migrants in Argentina, particularly because of its concentration of universities, professional institutes and cultural industries.

== Education and migration profile ==
Higher education has been one of the principal factors shaping the community. Ecuadorian students have enrolled in the University of Buenos Aires, the University of Palermo and other public and private institutions. Fields represented in the available studies and press coverage include literature, architecture, acting, design, communication and event management.

The perceived accessibility of Argentine education, the range of available programmes and the cost of studying relative to Ecuador have been recurring motivations. Some students have also cited admission restrictions or the cost of private education in Ecuador, as well as the cultural and professional opportunities available in Buenos Aires. Many educational migrants have regarded their stay as temporary. Studies have found that a substantial proportion planned to return to Ecuador after graduating and use their qualifications there. Others hoped to obtain employment in Argentina or establish businesses after completing their studies.

The relative cost of living has varied according to inflation and exchange-rate conditions in Argentina. During the 2000s, Ecuadorian students frequently regarded Argentina as less expensive than Ecuador because their income or family support was denominated in United States dollars. Later reporting described Ecuadorian residents facing Argentine inflation and restrictions on access to foreign currency.

During the early 2020s, insecurity in Ecuador became an additional factor cited by migrants. Students interviewed in Buenos Aires contrasted conditions in Ecuador with the availability of public transport, nightlife and educational opportunities in the Argentine capital. At the same time, several stated that Argentina's economic instability discouraged permanent settlement.

=== 2025 increase ===
In June 2025, several Ecuadorian news outlets reported that Argentina had displaced the United States as the principal destination recorded for Ecuadorian travellers. Figures attributed to Ecuador's Interior Ministry indicated that 24,630 Ecuadorians had travelled to Argentina between January and May, while 16,876 had returned to Ecuador, producing a difference of 7,754 journeys.

The figures represent recorded departures and returns, rather than a count of migrants who established residence. They may include tourists, students, temporary visitors and people making more than one journey. Consequently, the difference of 7,754 cannot be added to, or directly compared with, the 8,879 Ecuador-born residents counted by the 2022 Argentine census. Contemporary coverage also noted that the numbers leaving for and returning from Argentina remained relatively close and cautioned against interpreting the difference as permanent migration.

The reported increase was attributed to comparatively simple regional travel procedures, educational opportunities and the cost of living, as well as tightening migration controls in the United States. Rising Argentine living and study costs, however, were also cited as factors encouraging some Ecuadorians to return home.

== Notable Ecuadorian Argentines ==
- Jaime Durán Barba (born 1947), political consultant
- Power Paola (born 1977), cartoonist
- Damián Lanza (born 1982), footballer, naturalized Argentine
- Erika Mercado (born 1992), volleyball player, naturalized Argentine

== See also ==
- Immigration to Argentina
  - Colombian Argentines
  - Venezuelan Argentines
  - Peruvian Argentines
- Education in Argentina
