= Embassy of Colombia, Buenos Aires =

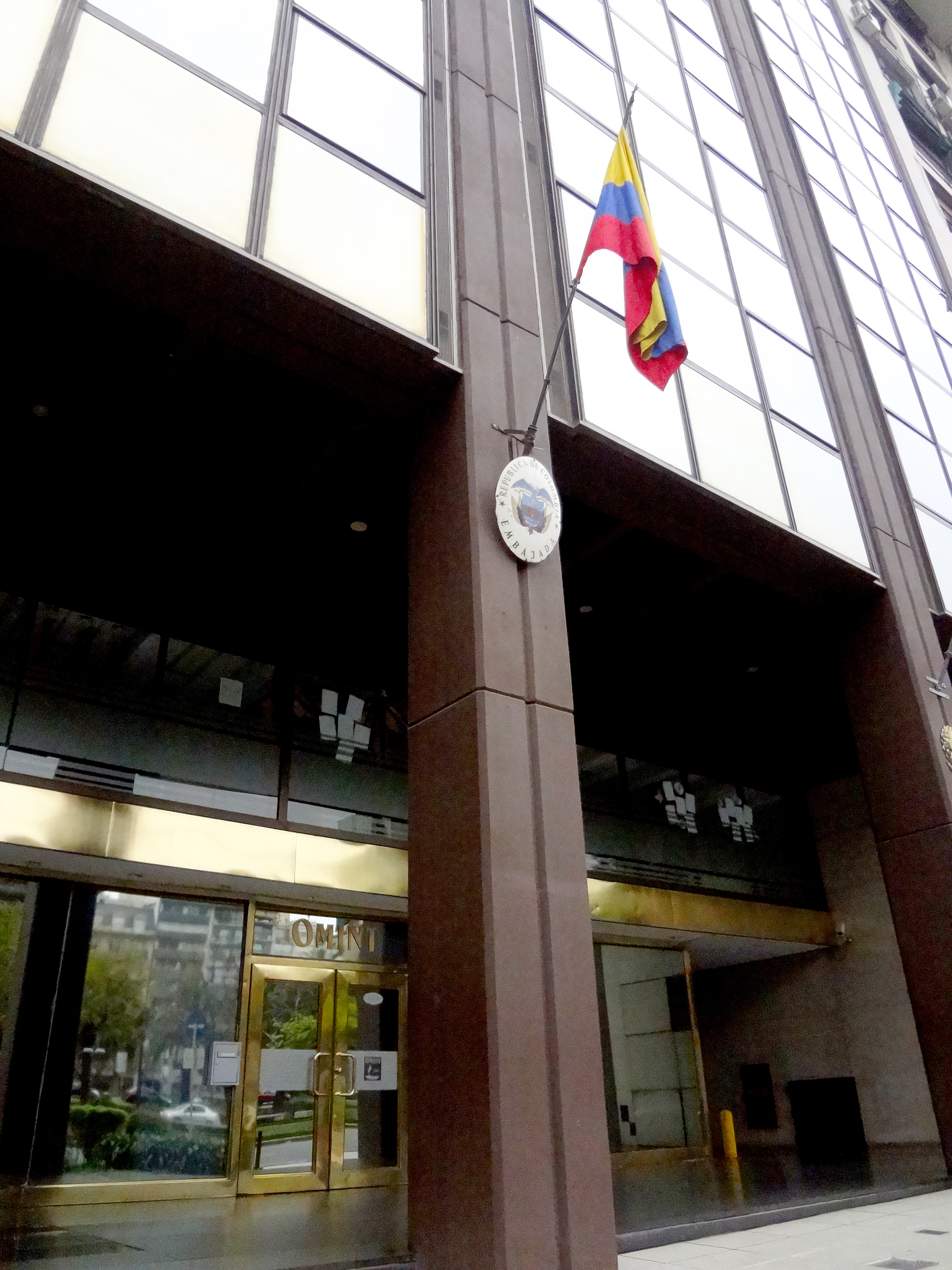
- Location: Retiro
- Address: Carlos Pellegrini 1363, 3rd Floor; 1011AAA Buenos Aires, Argentina
- Coordinates: 34°35′31.48″S 58°22′52.71″W
- Ambassador: Carlos Rodado Noriega

The Embassy of Colombia in Buenos Aires is the diplomatic mission of the Republic of Colombia to the Argentine Republic; it is headed by the Ambassador of Colombia to Argentina. It is located in the Retiro neighbourhood of Buenos Aires, near San Martín Palace, Patio Bullrich, and the Isaac Fernández Blanco Museum of Hispanic-American Art, precisely at Carlos Pellegrini 1363 at the intersection of Via Pasquale Stanislao Mancini, and it is serviced by the Retiro station.

The embassy is located on the third floor of the building; also housed there is the Consulate General of Brazil in Buenos Aires on the fifth floor of the building.

== See also ==
- Argentina-Colombia relations
