= Colombian Argentines =

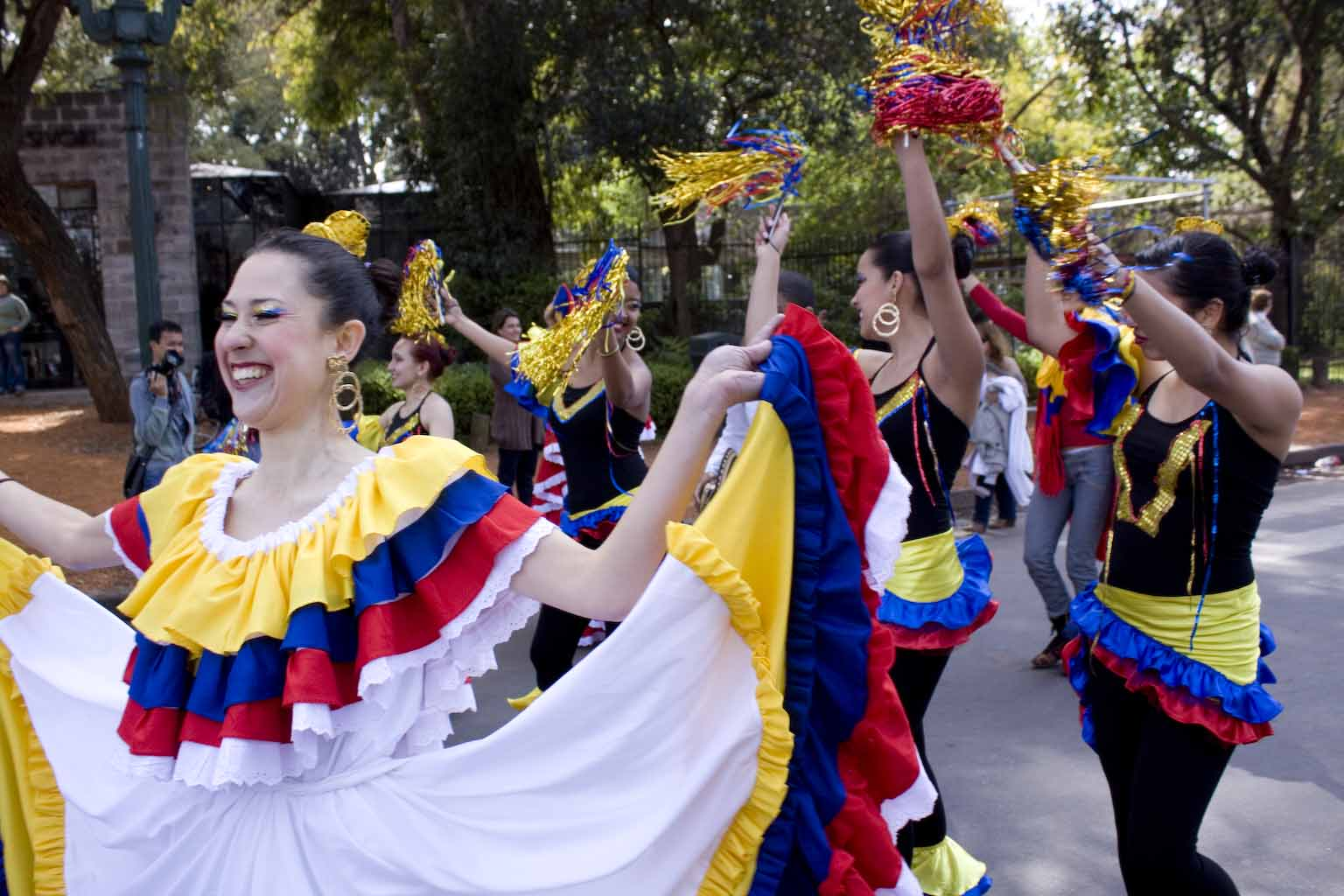
- Colombians during "Immigrants' Day" celebrations in Buenos Aires

Total population
- 118,687 (by birth, 2023); Unknown (by ancestry)

Regions with significant populations
- Predominantly the Greater Buenos Aires

Languages
- Colombian Spanish; Rioplatense Spanish

Religion
- Roman Catholicism

Related ethnic groups
- Colombians

Colombian Argentines (Spanish: colombo-argentinos) are Argentine citizens of partial or full Colombian descent, or Colombian citizens who have migrated to and settled in Argentina. As of 2023, there were 119,000 Colombians living in Argentina, most of whom migrated during the 2010s.

As of 2018, Colombians were the fifth-largest expat community in Argentina, behind Paraguayans, Venezuelans, Bolivians and Chileans. The last census held in Argentina, in 2010, registered 17,576 Colombian migrants living permanently in the country.

== Characteristics ==
One of the largest immigrant populations in Argentina, Colombian immigration grew considerably during the 2010s. While the 2001 national census in Argentina registered only 3,876 Colombian citizens residing in Argentina, the following census, held in 2010, registered 17,576, leading a 2016 IOM study characterizing it as an "emergent phenomenon". Many young Colombians choose Argentina as a temporary destination to complete higher education studies, as public universities in Argentina are free of charge, even for non-citizens. For this reason, many young immigrants settle in large urban centers close to major universities, such as Buenos Aires.

Economic crisis and lack of job opportunities in Argentina lead many of these immigrants to return to Colombia or migrate elsewhere once they finish their education.

== Notable people ==
- Ana María Campoy (1925–2006), actress
- Frank Fabra (born 1991), footballer
- Ivonne Guzmán (born 1984), singer
- Francisco de Narváez (born 1953), politician and former gubernatorial candidate
- Carlos Navarro Montoya (born 1966), footballer
- Ana María Orozco (born 1973), actress
- Walter Perazzo (born 1962), footballer
- Margarita García Robayo (born 1989), novelist

== See also ==
- Argentina–Colombia relations
- Immigration to Argentina
- Venezuelan Argentines
