= Argentina–Japan relations =

- Argentina: Japan

Argentina–Japan relations were established in the late 19th century. Argentina maintains an embassy in Tokyo and Japan maintains an embassy in Buenos Aires.

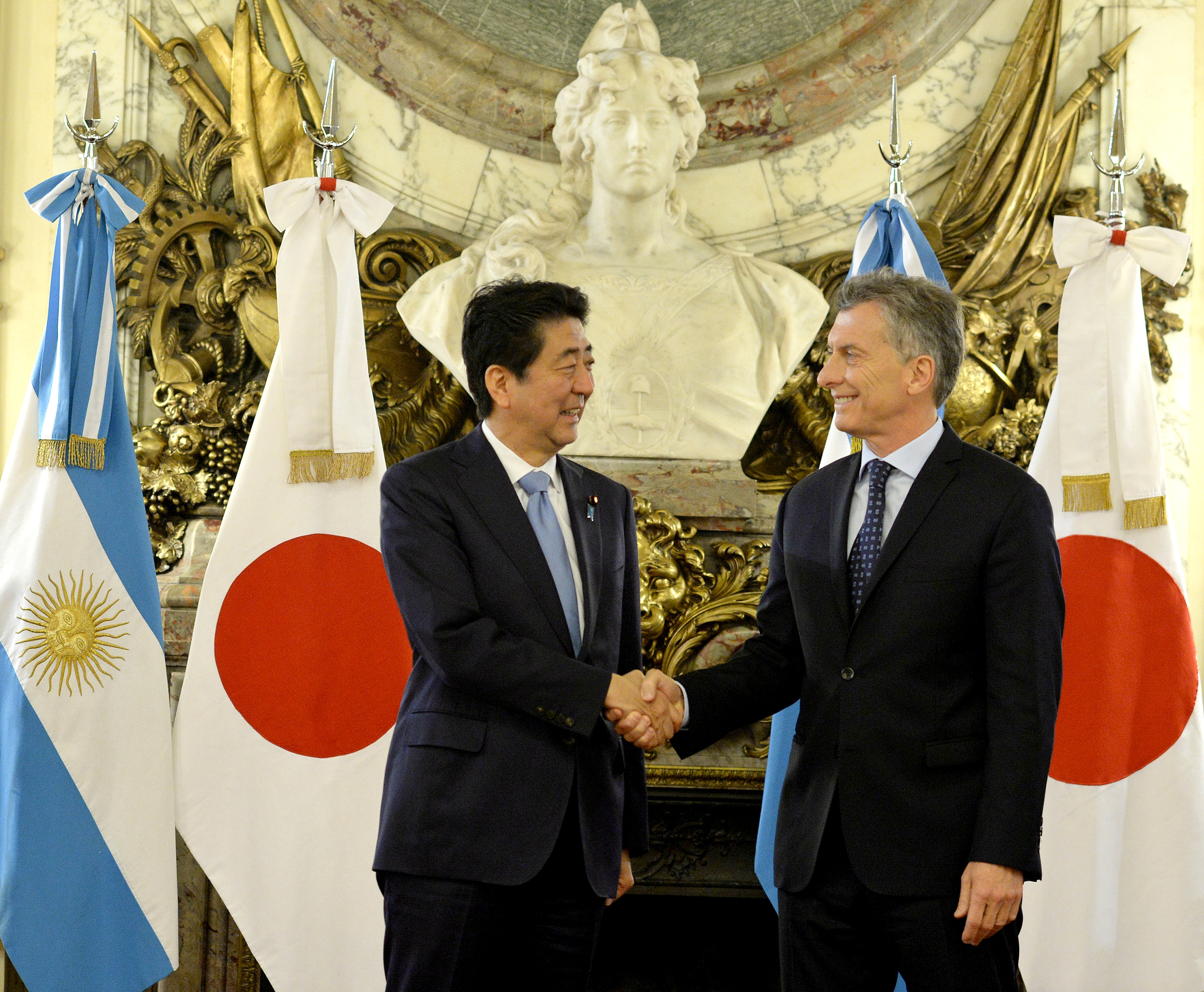
Japanese PM Shinzō Abe (left) and Argentine President Mauricio Macri on November 21, 2016.

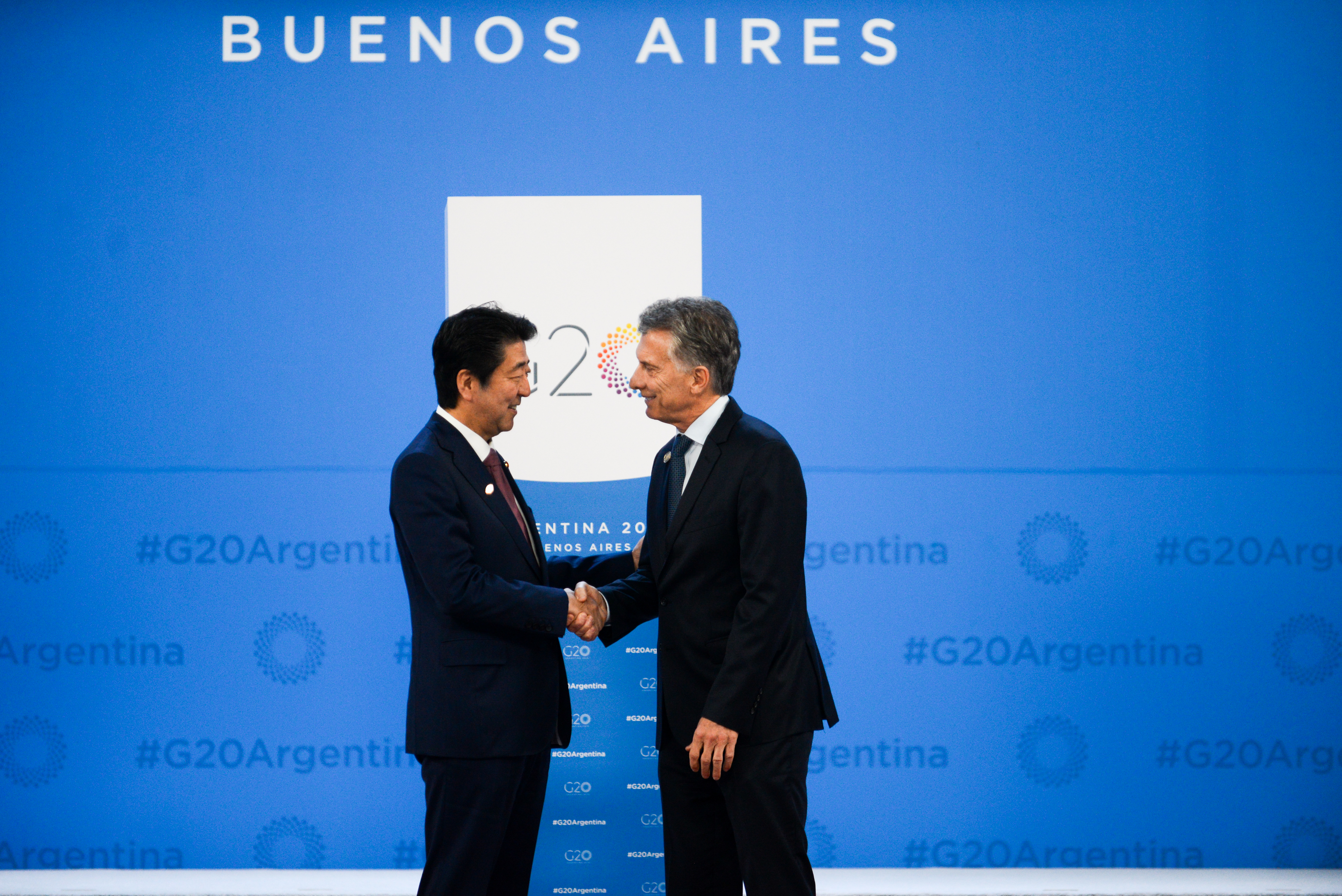
Japanese PM Shinzō Abe (left) and Argentine President Mauricio Macri on November 30, 2018.

== Early contacts ==
According to a file of the Royal Court of Córdoba, Argentina, there was a Japanese young man baptized as Francisco Xapon, which indicated his arrival in the country. He was sold as a slave in 1596 by the slave merchant Diego López de Lisboa, to the priest Miguel Jerónimo de Porras. In 1598, Xapón won liberty at a trial, and was released. The history of Japanese-Argentine relations was influenced to a large extent by Argentina being a country of immigration. The first known Japanese to immigrate to Argentina arrived by boat in 1886. Among the Japanese to immigrate to Argentina was Professor Seizo Itoh, expert on agriculture, who came to Argentina in 1910 and worked to improve the level of agriculture in his new country.

The Empire of Japan and the Argentine Republic established formal diplomatic relations at a Legation level with a Treaty of Amity, Commerce and Navigation on February 3, 1898. Following the conclusion of the agreement, regular trade relations by sea began in 1899.

Argentina assisted Japan in the Russo-Japanese War by agreeing to sell Japan the cruiser Nisshin, which had originally been purchased for the Argentine Navy. However, prior to 1941, the main aspect of relations between Argentina and Japan was immigration, mostly of agricultural laborers. There are currently an estimated 10,000 people of Japanese descent living in Argentina.

Diplomatic relations between Japan and Argentina were raised to Embassy level in 1940, and the following year Rodolfo Morena was appointed the first Argentine Ambassador to Japan, while Akira Tomii became the first Japanese Ambassador to Argentina. Relations were severed in 1944, and on March 27, 1945, the Argentine government entered World War II on the Allied side and declared war on the Japanese Empire.

== Modern developments ==
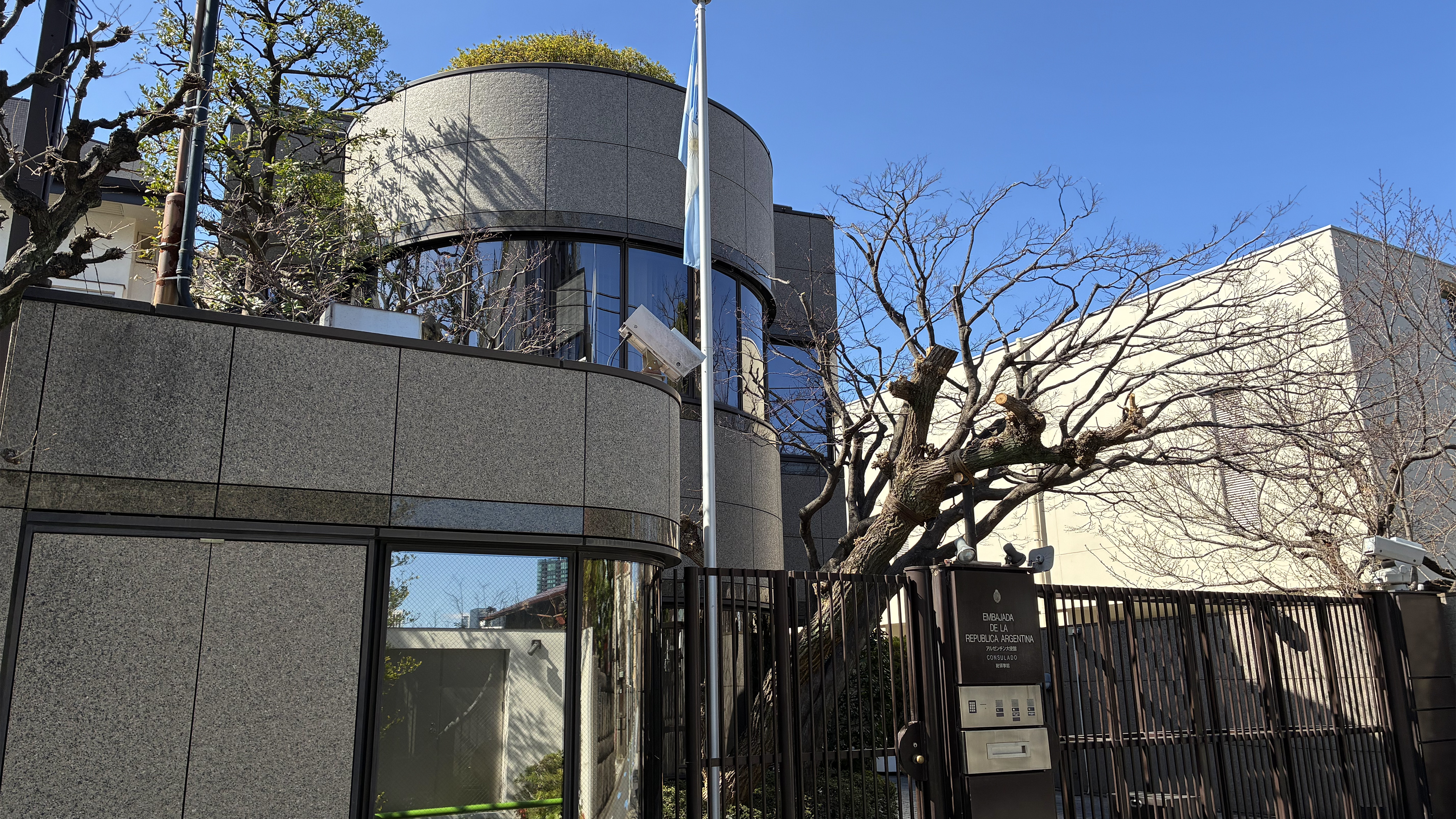
Embassy of Argentina in Japan

Diplomatic relations were restored by the signing of the San Francisco Peace Treaty in 1952. Argentine president Arturo Frondizi visited Japan in 1960, and subsequently bilateral trade and Japanese investment into Argentina have increased in importance. Japanese imports were primarily foodstuffs and raw materials, while exports were mostly machinery and finished products. In addition, agreements on cooperation in various aspects were concluded. In 1963, the two governments concluded agreement on immigration, in 1967 a treaty of amity, commerce and navigation and in 1981 agreements on technical cooperation and cultural exchange.

Japanese cultural imports such as anime, video games, food, films, and music have had a significant impact in Argentina.

== High-level visits ==
High-level visits from Argentina to Japan

- President Arturo Frondizi (1961)
- President Jorge Rafael Videla (1979)
- President Raúl Alfonsín (1986)
- President Carlos Menem (1990, 1993, 1998)
- President Mauricio Macri (2017, 2019)

High-level visits from Japan to Argentina

- Prime Minister Nobusuke Kishi (1959)
- Crown Prince Akihito and Princess Michiko (1967)
- Prince Takamado and Princess Takamado (1991)
- Emperor Akihito and Empress Michiko (1997)
- Prince Akishino and Princess Akishino (1998)
- Princess Takamado (2008)
- Princess Akiko (2013)
- Princess Takamado (2013)
- Prince Akishino and Princess Akishino (2014)
- Prime Minister Shinzo Abe (2016, 2018)

== Resident diplomatic missions ==
- Argentina has an embassy in Tokyo.
- Japan has an embassy in Buenos Aires.

== See also ==
- Foreign relations of Argentina
- Foreign relations of Japan
- Japanese Argentines
