= Argentina–Colombia relations =

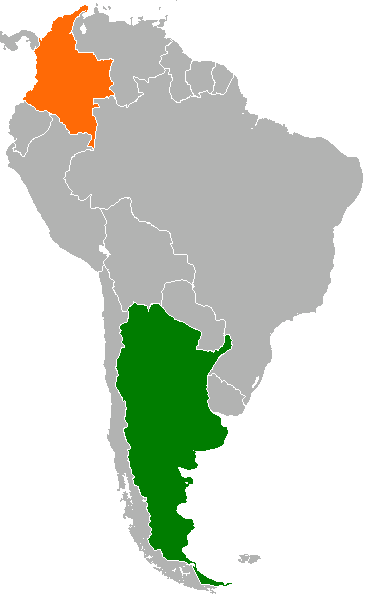
- Argentina: Colombia

Relations between the Argentine Republic and the Republic of Colombia were established on May 8, 1825. Originally, the Treaty of Friendship and Alliance was established with the State of Buenos Aires, within the United Provinces of the Río de la Plata. Argentina is a member of Mercosur whilst Colombia is an associate member. Both countries are members of the Organization of American States, Community of Latin American and Caribbean States, Latin American Integration Association and Organization of Ibero-American States.

== History ==
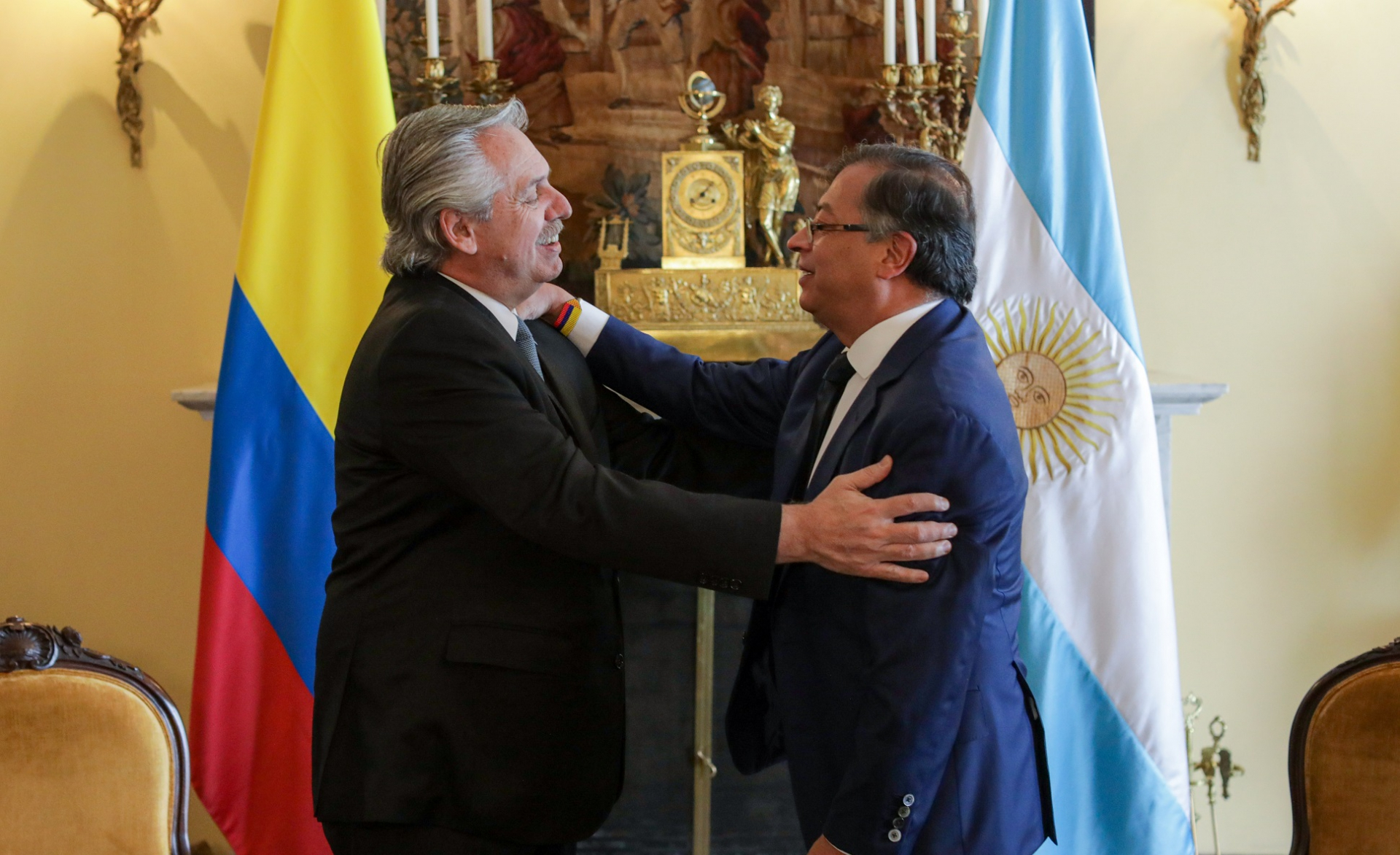
Colombian President Gustavo Petro meeting with then-President of Argentina, Alberto Fernández, August 2022.

During the 19th century and particularly during the 1820s, the relationship between these two states was active as the constant interaction between their respective leaders, Simón Bolívar and José de San Martín, was required to complete the total liberation of South America. As evidence of the above, the former Argentine president Bartolomé Mitre wrote the following in his Historia de San Martín y de la emancipación suamericana:

These two tendencies (the independences), concurrent at one point, –the general emancipation,—represented by two political and military hegemonies,—the Argentine and the Colombian, - constitute the last knot of the South American revolution... (San Martín) He concurs in the independence of Colombia, carries the flag of the Argentine-Chilean-Peruvian revolution to the foot of Pichincha, greeted by the Colombian liberators, who carry out a similar campaign plan, no less gigantic than his...

— Bartolomé Mitre

On July 27, 1822, the Guayaquil Interview took place, a private meeting between the heads of state of the sovereign nations of the Río de la Plata and Gran Colombia. On that occasion, they discussed the management of the Province of Guayaquil and what the final strategy should be to liberate Peru and Upper Peru (today Bolivia and parts of neighboring countries) that were home to the last manifestations of Spanish domination in the region.

Likewise, General San Martín requested help from Bolívar to conclude the Southern Campaigns, a fact that is supported by the following letter that he sent to the Colombian liberator in 1821:

Consequently, without the support of the army under your command, the operation being prepared for Intermediate Ports will not be able to achieve the advantages that were expected, if powerful forces do not call the enemy's attention elsewhere and thus the fight will be prolonged for an indefinite time. I say indefinite because I am intimately convinced that whatever the vicissitudes of the present war, the independence of America is irrevocable... With these sentiments and with those of wishing you only that you have the glory of ending the war of independence of South America, your most affectionate servant repeats.

— José de San Martín

Determined to join forces to combat the remaining Spaniards, the battles of Pichincha, Junín and Ayacucho were fought between 1822 and 1824. After the victory at Pichincha, the Gaceta Mercantil de Argentina wrote the following highlighting the Argentine contribution to the Southern District of Gran Colombia:

We will eternally shower blessings on the heroes of Chacabuco and Maipú; yes, those who have triumphantly carried the Argentine flag to Quito (Gran Colombia), and who have known how to shed their blood for the freedom of the Homeland in Junín and Ayacucho.

— Gaceta Mercantil

In the wars of Junín and Ayacucho, the United Liberation Army of Peru, which consisted of Peruvian, Chilean, Colombian and Argentine formations, faced the Royal Army of Peru. Among the squadrons contributed by Gran Colombia to said army were the Colombian Hussars and, on the part of Argentina, the Horse Grenadiers of the Andes. The same South American army later went to Bolivia to consolidate the independence of that country after neutralizing the Callao uprising and winning the Battle of Tumusla.

Other historical events that highlight the active interaction between the governments of Argentina and Colombia include: the Colombian occupation of Upper Peru, the Auxiliary Expedition of Santa Cruz to Quito, the establishment of the Protectorate of San Martín and the emergence of the Republic of Bolívar.

With the continent's freedom consolidated, the War for the Banda Oriental that resulted in the independence of the Oriental Republic of Uruguay was also the cause of political contacts between Argentina and Colombia. In particular, the Rioplatense government sought the help of Colombia, whose army occupied Bolivia at the time, to invade the Brazilian Empire in Mato Grosso. However, Bolívar refused because the United Provinces had declined to participate in the Congress of Panama.

Colombia had a passive participation in the War of the Triple Alliance when it showed its rejection of what happened to Paraguay during the conflict. Colombia contributed to the restoration of Paraguay's sovereignty. This weakened relations between Argentina and Colombia until 1912.

Colombia has maintained relations with Argentina, when it was the United Provinces of the Río de la Plata, since 1823; this relationship was due to Latin American attempts at international recognition in order to achieve total independence from the Spanish Empire. The establishment of these diplomatic relations was established by the Treaty of Friendship and Alliance between the State of Buenos Aires and the Republic of Colombia, which was signed in 1823, entering into force two years later.

Colombia has therefore maintained a diplomatic representation in Buenos Aires and Argentina has done the same in Bogotá. In addition, Colombia has maintained an Honorary Consulate in the city of Mendoza since 2012.

Relations between Argentina and Colombia continued in the 20th century with the creation of the Union of American Republics, along with other countries. Both countries remained neutral in the First World War and were founders of the League of Nations. By the Second World War, both nations held different positions. On the one hand, Colombia maintained very close ties with the United States, so the declaration of war on the Axis powers was imminent; because of the commercial blockade, these relations changed destination to Washington and London, mainly to the latter; thus, Colombia and Argentina, along with Chile, were the only Latin American countries that declared war on Germany. To end the first half of the 20th century, Argentina and Colombia were two of the fifty founding countries of the United Nations and the Organization of American States.

In 1967, both foreign ministers met to sign agreements related to maritime and air taxation, and nuclear issues. Later, in 1972, the presidents of that time, Alejandro Agustín Lanusse of Argentina and Misael Pastrana Borrero of Colombia, met to sign another agreement; although these events occurred, the relations between both nations were not close due to the lack of agreement on the issue of democracy.

Colombia remained neutral during the Falklands War, but currently supports Argentina's claims. On the other hand, the rapprochements between Argentina and Colombia were embodied in the Contadora Group, which would end up becoming the Rio Group in 1990. Thus, in the last decade of the 20th century, Argentina changed its foreign policy towards the United States, demonstrating its support for Plan Colombia.

=== 21st century ===
In the first decade of the 21st century, relations between Argentina and Colombia were truncated by issues such as the lack of unconditional support from Colombia regarding the Falklands War during the latter part of the 20th century, which only showed a change during the Rio Group meeting in Cancun in 2010, when then-President Álvaro Uribe announced Colombia's support for the United Kingdom.

In 2013, the former commander general of the Armed Forces was appointed by President Juan Manuel Santos Calderón as the new Colombian ambassador to the Argentine Republic. On March 18, 2014, he presented his credentials. Civil society authorities reacted to this news, including the Nobel Peace Prize winner, Adolfo Pérez Esquivel, who asked the Argentine government to reject the appointment, since the former military man was accused of serious violations of human rights and that for the Argentine government, such violations are unacceptable. The Uribe general was also under investigation for crimes against humanity. He was involved in the case of "false positives". He finally received his diplomatic approval.

In 2024, a diplomatic conflict arose when Argentine President Javier Milei insulted his Colombian counterpart, Gustavo Petro, leading to an international conflict and Colombia recalling its ambassador for consultations. In this regard, the embassy issued a statement stating that "Milei's statements "disregard and violate the deep ties of friendship, understanding and cooperation that have historically united both countries." Colombia subsequently decided to expel the Argentine diplomats from the embassy in Bogotá. After this, the Republic of Colombia and its government received solidarity from various political sectors and Argentine personalities who repudiated Milei's statements.

In parallel, Mexico considered imitating Colombia's sovereign decision and imitating the expulsion of Argentine diplomats following the comments of the Argentine president.

== Significant issues ==
Relations between Argentina and Colombia are based on regional integration through multilateral organizations and institutions; economic relations in trade, investment and tourism; educational and cultural cooperation; assistance in the fight against drug trafficking; and advice on port infrastructure and navigation.

=== Malvinas ===
During the escalation of the conflict, the Colombian president, Julio César Turbay, sent a letter to General Galtieri advising him that military action was not a good idea, so the official position of the head of state and the foreign ministry was to support Argentine claims if they did not opt for war. However, the government maintained neutrality in the war and constantly sent letters to Margaret Thatcher and Leopoldo Galtieri in which it asked to find a path to dialogue. However, in 1982, the countries that were part of the Andean Pact (Colombia, Venezuela, Peru, Ecuador and Bolivia) proposed various forms of assistance to Argentina, such as a complete break in relations with the United Kingdom, the creation of a Latin American committee to assist Argentina, which sought to provide economic aid, and even evaluating the possibility of offering military aid, as proposed by Bolivia.

Under President Álvaro Uribe Vélez, Colombia has renewed its support for Argentina in its claim to the Malvinas archipelago, perhaps due to the weight that comes with being the only state in the region not to be fully aligned with its neighbors. This fact was most evident during the II Latin American and Caribbean Summit of 2010 held in Cancun, Mexico, at this summit there was unanimous support for the Argentine claims. For the VI Summit of the Americas, held in 2012 in Cartagena de Indias, Argentine President Cristina Fernández de Kirchner decided to leave the venue prematurely because the issue of the Malvinas was avoided at the summit, for which the Colombian government issued a statement saying that it supports the Argentine cause. However, for Colombia it is essential to call for a dialogue between Great Britain and Argentina.

This was confirmed by the last meeting held by the Ministers of Foreign Affairs in September 2012, Héctor Timerman and María Ángela Holguín. At this meeting it was established that the best solution to this conflict is a dialogue between the Argentine Republic and the United Kingdom of Great Britain and Northern Ireland.

Changing the traditional position of neutrality, on June 10, 2019, President Iván Duque expressed, during his official visit to Argentina, that Colombia fully supports "the legitimate rights of the Argentine Republic in the sovereignty dispute with the United Kingdom of Great Britain and Northern Ireland, relating to the Malvinas, South Georgia, South Sandwich Islands and the surrounding maritime spaces." This statement put an end to the ambiguities in Colombia's position regarding the Falkland Islands and the country aligned itself with other South American nations to fully support Argentina.

=== Peace Process ===
One day after the declaration announcing the peace talks between the Santos government and the FARC, on September 5, 2012, the Argentine government announced:

Argentina has expressed its full willingness to collaborate in the success of the dialogue, as well as to offer everything that the Colombian government considers that our country can contribute to this historic process.

— Press Release from the Argentine Government

This was the first sign of support from the government for the peace talks. Then, on May 25, 2013, Nobel Peace Prize winner and Argentine activist Adolfo Pérez Esquivel issued a statement in which he said:

We must put an end to violence and fundamentally disarm armed consciences. Armed consciences that have done so much harm to the people and to humanity.

— Statement by Adolfo Perez Esquivel

Finally, during President Cristina Fernández's visit to Bogotá on July 19, 2013, she spoke of the transformation of Colombia based on the willingness to change the situation of violence that Colombia has experienced; she also spoke of how essential this is for the country and that those who oppose this process can be classified as foolish. This last statement could be understood as an interference in the internal affairs of the Andean country, but it did not have much significance.

Argentine support comes not only from its government or from individuals, but also from UNASUR, which in September 2014 issued a statement in which the 11 South American nations announced their support for the peace process and sought to participate in it.

==== Human trafficking ====
One of the results of Colombian immigration to Argentina is slavery, or human trafficking for sexual purposes, which represents 2% of the total victims.

This has been a recurring problem and has therefore led both countries to sign a treaty in 2014 to combat this crime. This agreement is based on sharing information to find victims and establish a work plan between the two agencies in charge of this crime, the Inter-institutional Committee to Combat Human Trafficking in Colombia and the Executive Committee against Trafficking in the Republic of Argentina; for this work plan, a comparison was made between the legislations of these Latin American countries.

=== Drug trafficking ===
The new waves of illegal drug trafficking to the south of the continent have led Argentina to begin to play an important role in the chain of cocaine trade and production. This has led to isolated cases that demonstrate the relationship between the cultivation and transformation of cocaine in Colombia and its production and transportation in Argentina. The most notable cases are the three extradited from Buenos Aires to Bogotá, and the case of the Colombian model.

Another point of debate is whether Argentina will become a Colombia. For former Colombian President Cesar Gaviria, Argentina is far from taking this role on the global and regional stage, although the growth of the problem has been considerable according to the 2014 Annual Report on Drugs of the United Nations Office on Drugs and Crime.

== Migration ==
Immigration in Argentina is a phenomenon that has been setting the trend in South America and Colombia has not escaped it. Although most migrations to Argentina come from its neighbors, mainly Paraguay and Bolivia, Colombia represents a considerable proportion, 16,539 residents in 2008. Likewise, this migratory process to Argentina is due to three main reasons: on the one hand, there are the interests of young people to go to study in the southern country, followed by job aspirations and finally, there is illegal immigration and human trafficking.

The arrival of Colombians to the City of Buenos Aires is one of the most recent immigrations in Argentina. In the 1960s, Argentina only had around 2,000 Colombian residents. The first significant group to arrive was during the 1990s. They were mainly Colombian professionals, mostly doctors, who came to "try their luck" in Argentina. The most important migration was that which arrived in the country after 2003. Between 2009 and 2010, the number of Colombians living in the country grew by 200% compared to the average for 2000-2008, the largest increase recorded among all nationalities.

Nearly half of the Colombians who arrived in Argentina are students who took advantage of the educational and economic benefits. The other half arrive with the intention of improving their living and working conditions. Some of these young people send part of their income to Colombia, although they have been affected by the currency crisis that occurred in Argentina since 2012.

== Trade ==
In 2004, Colombia, Ecuador and Venezuela signed a free trade agreement with the four Mercosur countries in order to liberalize import barriers. Thus, in February 2005, Argentina and Colombia signed a bilateral agreement within the framework of this treaty. The main purpose of this agreement is to achieve the long-awaited South American integration. As for Argentina, it hopes to be able to take over a certain agricultural market in Colombia, while for the Andean country, the pharmaceutical sector is its main objective.

Thus, by 2013, Colombia represented one of the main destinations for Argentine exports.

Trade between Argentina and Colombia
Country	Exports ($USD)	Percentage (exports)	Percentage (imports)	Percentage (total)	Products
Argentina	$1,733,545,068	0.20%	0,59%	0,39%	cereals, food waste, land vehicles, animal oils, mechanical devices, pharmaceutical products.
Colombia	$433,025,665	0.73%	2.92%	1.83%	land vehicles, plastics manufactures, mineral fuels, organic and inorganic chemical products, miscellaneous manufactures, pharmaceutical products.

Sources: Trade Map

== Transport links ==
Colombian airline Avianca operates flights between Bogotá and Medillin to Buenos Aires.

== Diplomatic missions ==
- Argentina has an embassy in Bogotá.
- Colombia has an embassy and consulate-general in Buenos Aires.
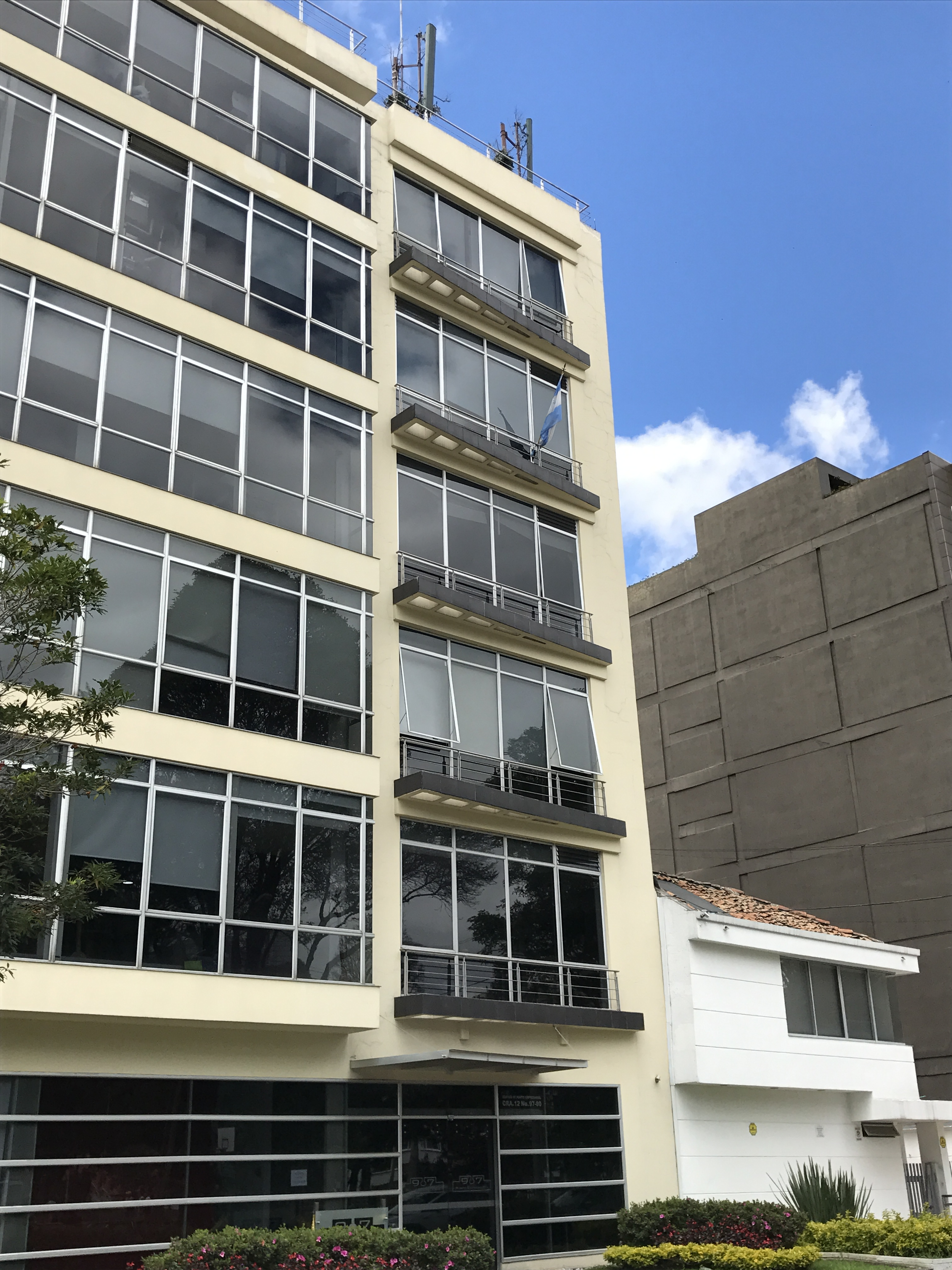
Embassy of Argentina in Bogotá

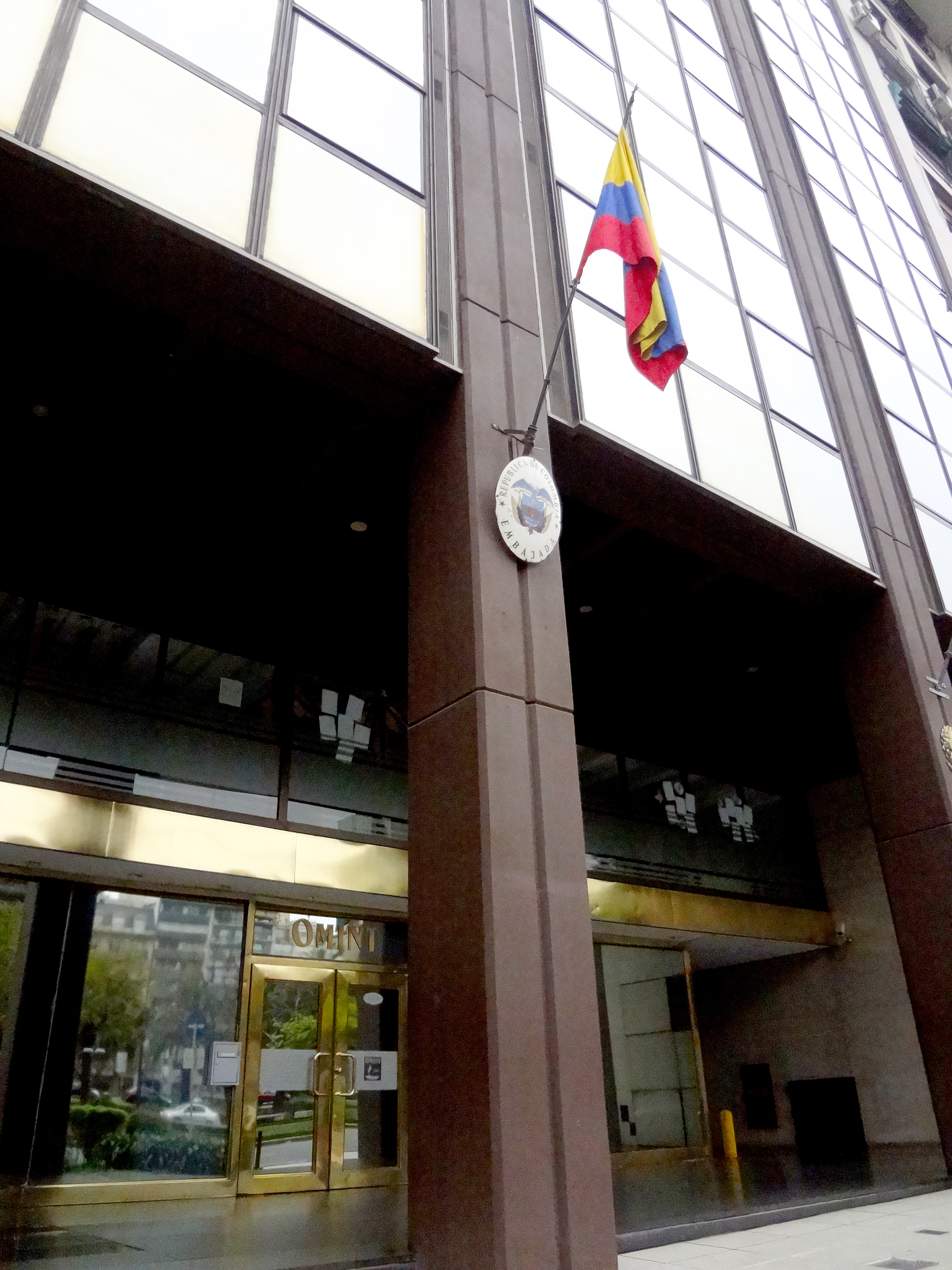
Embassy of Colombia in Buenos Aires

== See also ==
- Foreign relations of Argentina
- Foreign relations of Colombia
- Colombian Argentines
